= Towterer =

Aboriginal Tasmanian leader

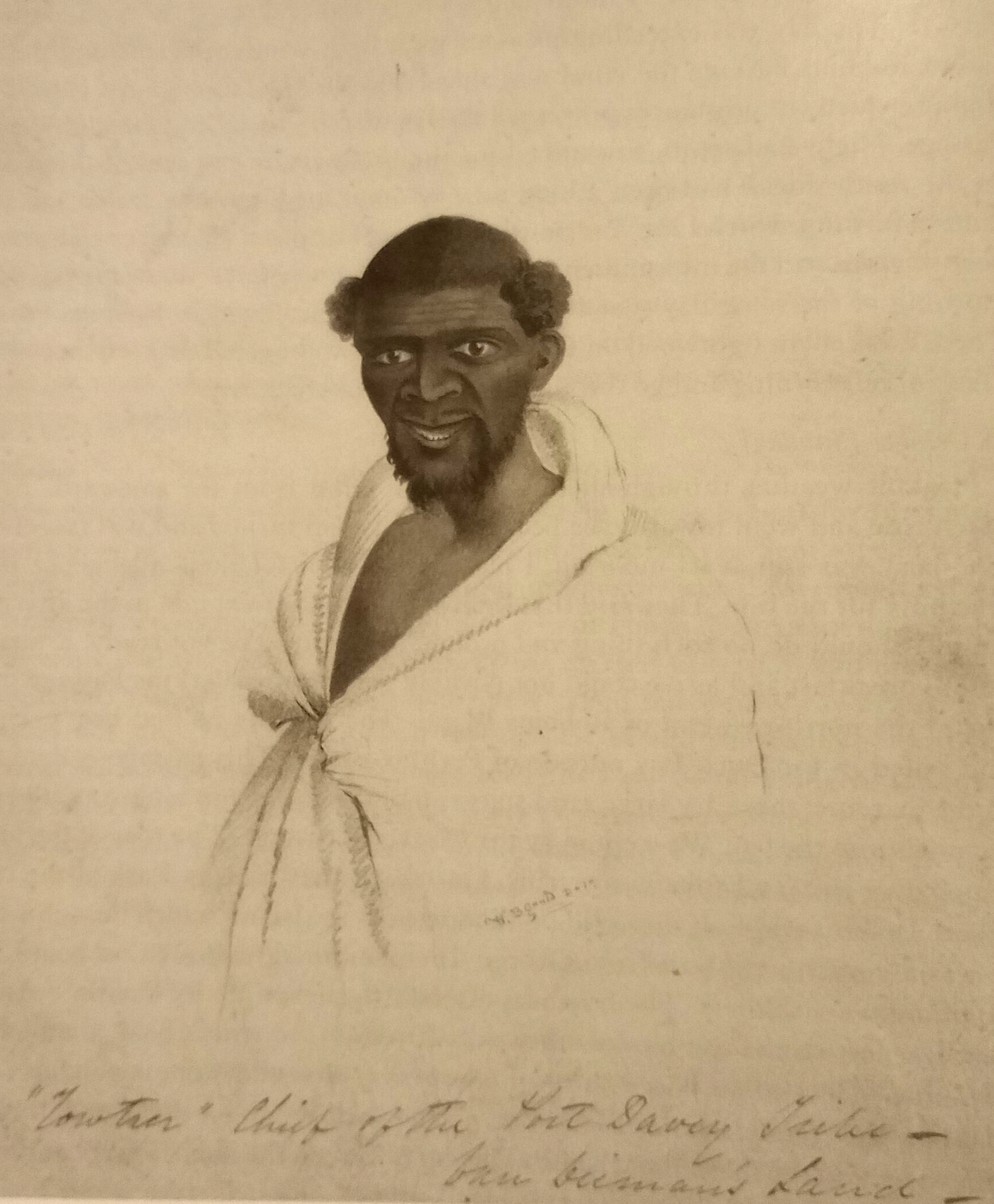
- Portrait of Towterer by William Buelow Gould
- Born: c. 1800; Southwestern Tasmania
- Died: 30 September 1837; Wybalenna Aboriginal Establishment, Flinders Island
- Spouse: Wonganeep
- Children: 2 (including Mathinna)
- Parents: Loomerer (father); Lywelopeh (mother)

Towterer (c.1800 – 30 September 1837) was a leading Aboriginal Tasmanian man of the Ninine clan from south-western Tasmania. He was part of the last group of Ninine to continue living a traditional lifestyle on the Tasmanian mainland before their forced transportation to the Wybalenna Aboriginal Establishment on Flinders Island in 1833. One of his daughters was Mathinna who was sent to live with Sir John Franklin and Lady Jane Franklin.

== Early life ==
Towterer was born around 1800 into the Ninine clan of Aboriginal Tasmanians of the southwestern region. His father was a prominent tribal leader named Loomerer and his mother was Lywelopeh. The country of his people extended from Port Davey in the south to Point Hibbs on the west coast of Tasmania.

Towterer's people lived a mostly coastal existence, where the men would hunt local birds and mammals, while the women would dive for abalone and crayfish. They made catamarans to journey to offshore islands such as Hobbs Island to hunt seals and seabirds. They also made intricate bird traps and would supplement their diet with kelp, local herbs and kangaroo apple. Their huts were distinctively warm and neat semi-circular constructions called gardown made with a framework of bent branches covered in a thatch of grass and the internal walls insulated with paperbark and feathers. Their major settlements were at Port Davey, Lowgernown, Point Hibbs and Nomeme near the Giblin River. The Ninine cremated their dead.

== First contact with the British ==
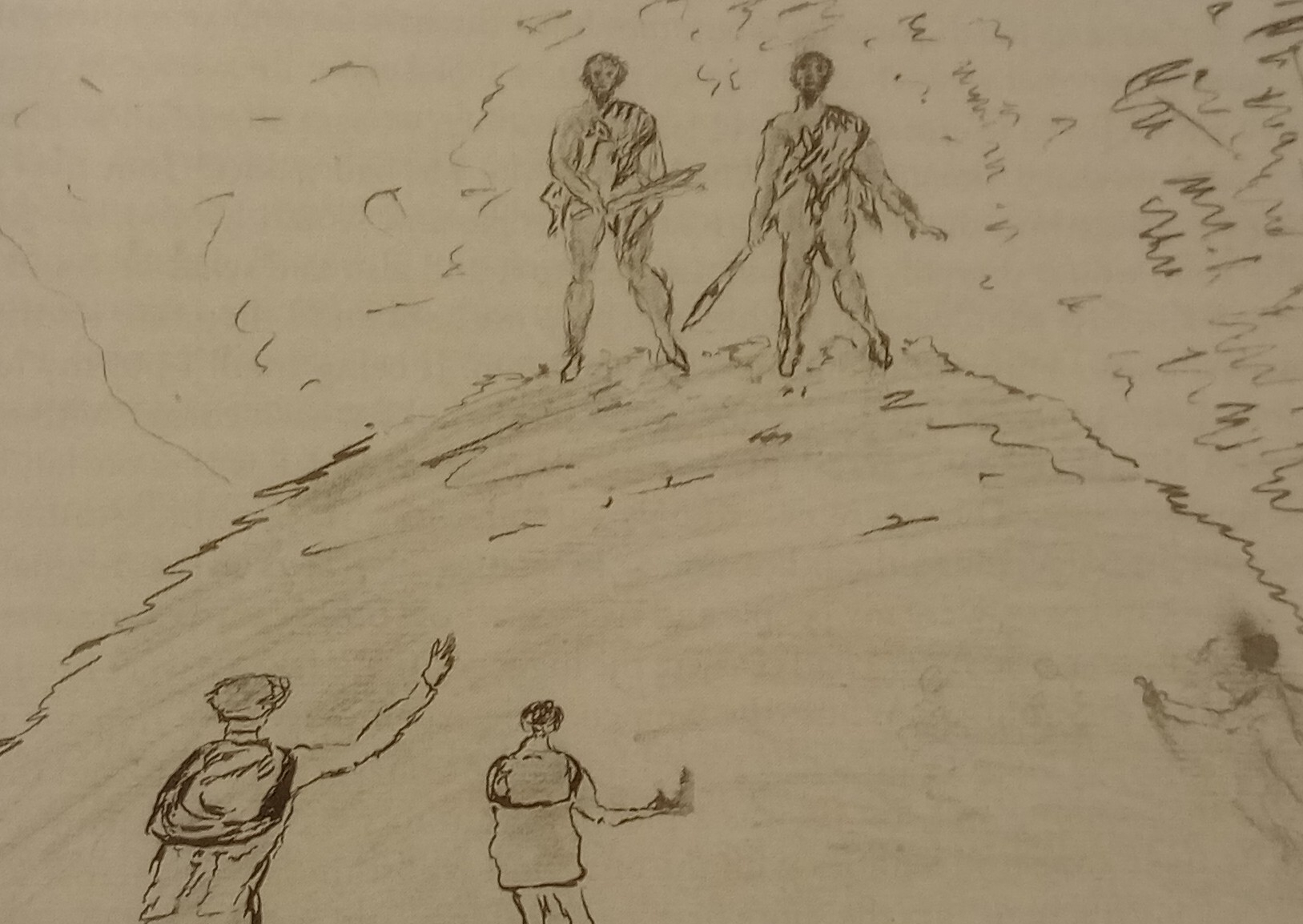
George Augustus Robinson meeting Towterer

By 1830, the British had colonised much of eastern Tasmania but the rugged south-west was almost completely unknown to the Europeans. In that same year, Lieutenant-Governor George Arthur permitted a British envoy named George Augustus Robinson to undertake an expedition to make contact with the resident people of this region and convince them to surrender to British control. Towterer by this time had become a leading identity of the Ninine clan and met with Robinson and his Aboriginal guides including Truganini in March 1830 near Gonovar (Giblin River).

Robinson described Towterer as being an impressive man of around six feet in height, with a pointed beard and a kangaroo-skin shawl. They established a friendly interaction and Towterer guided Robinson north to the Lewis River where he left him to continue his journey.

== The stealing of Towterer's child ==
The lives of the Ninine remained relatively unchanged until the return of Robinson to their country in 1833. In the intervening three years Robinson had led a campaign of locating, taking captive and exiling to Flinders Island the Aboriginal Tasmanians from the eastern regions. He was now contracted by the colonial government to do likewise with the Indigenous people of the western part of the island.

In May 1833, Robinson's party of convicts and Indigenous guides arrived at Lowgernown. They surprised Towterer's clan and trapped them in a large communal hut. Towterer, his wife Wonganeep and a few others managed to escape but 12 other Ninine were captured including Towterer's four-year-old daughter named Djukeh.

The 12 captives were forced marched at gunpoint to the Macquarie Harbour Penal Station with Towterer's little girl carried firstly by an Indigenous guide and then by a convict after the guide threw her to the ground. After briefly being held at the station's hospital, these 12 people were shipped off into exile at the Wybalenna Aboriginal Establishment on Flinders Island. Robinson noted that these Ninine were to be packed into the transport ship like slaves.

== Towterer taken captive and forced into exile ==
Towterer was frantic after the stealing of his child and followed Robinson's group to Macquarie Harbour, trying to attract their attention but his efforts were ignored. In mid June, Robinson returned again to Lowgernown to take Towterer and the remaining people of his tribe captive. He knew that Towterer would give himself up readily to be re-united with his daughter.

Towterer, his wife and five others were the last group of Ninine living on country, and all of them were taken by Robinson back to Macquarie Harbour. However, Towterer's elderly mother, Lywelope, couldn't walk and Towterer was forced to leave his mother behind. Robinson later sent a group of men to fetch her but she died near Birchs Inlet after being made to swim across a flooded river in an emaciated state.

On 23 June 1833, Towterer and the other surviving Ninine were transported to Flinders Island. Before they embarked from Macquarie Harbour, convict artist William Buelow Gould sketched a portrait of Towterer.

== Wybalenna ==
Towterer was placed in exile together with over a hundred other Indigenous Tasmanians from all regions, at the Wybalenna Aboriginal Establishment on Flinders Island. He was never re-united with his daughter Djukeh as she had been taken away to the orphan school in Hobart before he arrived. She later died of measles at the orphanage in 1835.

At Wybalenna, Towterer was given the European name of Romeo and his wife Wonganeep had her name changed to Evaline. They were placed under the regime of George Augustus Robinson where their cultural practices were restricted and they were forced to adopt European habits and learn Christian principles. Food sources were scarce, the water supply was poor and there was inadequate housing. Many of the detainees sickened and died in such unhealthy conditions.

== Death and legacy ==
Towterer died in September 1837 at Wybalenna and his wife Wonganeep died there sometime after March 1839.

Before their death, they had another daughter named Mary who was born in 1835. While her mother was still alive, Mary was taken to Hobart to live at Government House with Sir John Franklin and his wife Lady Jane Franklin. Lady Jane renamed Mary as Mathinna and attempted to "civilise" her. The Franklins later abandoned Mathinna and she was taken to the orphan school in Hobart. Mathinna was later transferred to the Aboriginal facility at Oyster Cove where she died a miserable death at the age of sixteen.

Towterer's body was autopsied and decapitated by Robinson, who kept the skull as part of his natural history collection. Towterer's skull was one of a number of Indigenous skulls that were later taken from Wybalenna by Europeans and used for pseudo-scientific analysis.

Towterer Beach and Towterer Creek in his home country of south-western Tasmania are named after him.

Towterer is a character in two historical fiction books, Wanting and Gould's Book of Fish by the author Richard Flanagan.

== See also ==
- List of Indigenous Australian historical figures
