= Mathinna (Tasmanian) =

Indigenous Tasmanian girl

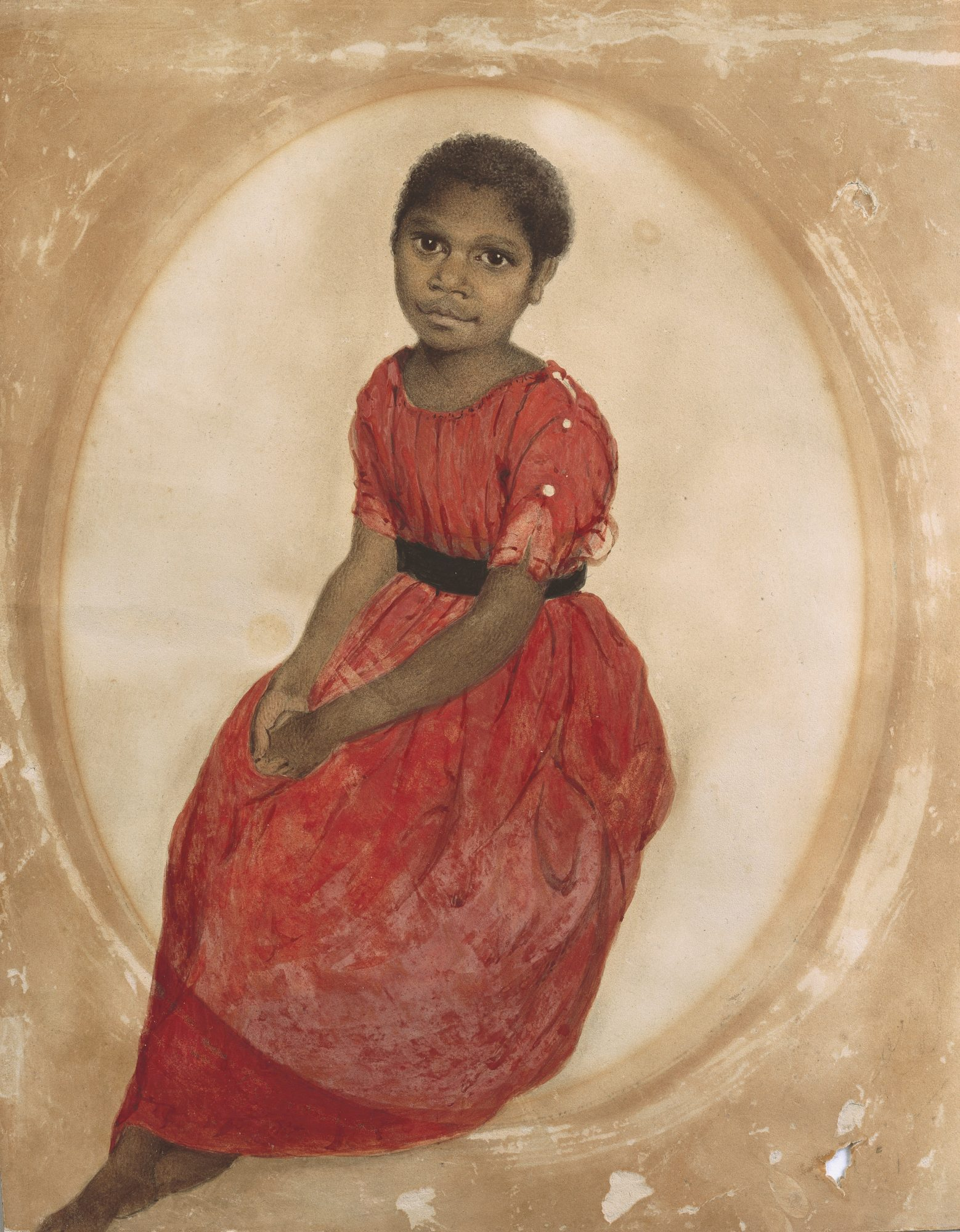
- Mathinna - 1842 watercolour by Thomas Bock
- Born: c. 1835; Wybalenna Aboriginal Establishment on Flinders Island
- Died: 1852 (aged 16–17); Oyster Cove, Tasmania, Australia
- Cause of death: Drowning
- Known for: Temporarily adopted by Lady Jane Franklin

Mathinna (c. 1835 – 1 September 1852) was an Aboriginal Tasmanian girl, who was kidnapped, adopted and later abandoned by the Governor of Van Diemen's Land, Sir John Franklin and his wife Lady Jane Franklin.

== Early life ==
Mathinna was born as Mary at the Wybalenna Aboriginal Establishment on Flinders Island around the year 1835. Her father was Towterer, an exiled leader of the Ninine tribe originally from south-west Tasmania, and her mother was Wongerneep. Both were captured by George Augustus Robinson, the Chief Protector of Aborigines, in 1833, and sent to Wybalenna as part of the policy of removing all of the Aboriginal people from mainland Van Diemen's Land, later known as Tasmania.

== Lady Jane Franklin requests a "black boy" ==
In 1837 Sir John Franklin was appointed Lieutenant Governor of Van Diemen's Land for a term of four years.

A year later, Sir John Franklin's wife, Lady Jane Franklin requested George Augustus Robinson to send her a "black boy" from Wybalenna along with other curiosities such as snakes. Robinson sent her a nine-year-old boy named Timemendic, whom Lady Jane renamed Timeo and handed over to her step-daughter Eleanor Franklin. He was trained as a household servant but was deemed too "idle and disobedient" and the Franklins attempted to offload him to the Hobart Orphan School. However, Timemendic was refused a place there and was sent to work on a government ship as a deckhand.

== Mathinna sent to live with the Franklins ==
In 1841, Lady Jane decided to try and "civilise" a second child from Wybalenna. A six-year-old girl named Mary was sent to live at Government House at Hobart with the Franklins although she was not an orphan. Again, it was Eleanor Franklin who was placed in charge of her care.

Lady Jane renamed Mary as Mathinna, which is derived from an Indigenous word for shell necklace.

Just one fragment of a letter dictated by Mathinna reveals what the transition from living with her family at Wybalenna to living at Government House in Hobart Town must have been like:

"I am good little girl, I have pen and ink cause I am a good little girl...I have a got a red frock like my father. Come here to see my father. I have got sore feet and shoes and stockings and I am very glad."

When Lady Jane compared Mathinna to Timemendic, she described Mathinna as being more intelligent and sweet, while Timemendic was "much blacker in complexion than Mathinna who appears to us to be daily growing more copper-coloured as she advances in civilization".

In 1842, Lady Jane commissioned Thomas Bock to paint Mathinna's portrait in which she is portrayed famously in a scarlet dress. Lady Jane sent the portrait to her sister in England with a letter describing Mathinna as "one of the remnant people about to disappear from the face of the earth", who has "the unconquerable nature of the savage".

== The Franklins abandon Mathinna ==
When Sir John was recalled to England, they left Mathinna at Queen's Orphan School in Hobart in 1843. Only eight years old, she found it difficult to adjust to her new surroundings. She was sent back to Wybalenna on Flinders Island in 1844, at the age of nine. The children at Wybalenna were separated from the adults and placed under the authority of the establishment's chaplain, Robert Clark and his wife. Clark treated the children brutally and Mathinna was one of the worst affected.

During an inquiry into Clark's management in 1846, Mathinna gave evidence saying:

"I have been under the care of Mr and Mrs Clark when I was flogged I was placed across a table and my hands and feet were tied. I was flogged every day...I think I was flogged when I ought not to be flogged...I was once flogged when the blood ran down my head."

In 1847 she was sent back to Queen's Orphan School. In 1851, when she was about 16, she was placed at the Aboriginal facility at Oyster Cove, west of Hobart.

== Death ==
Mathinna drowned, according to one account, in a puddle on Old Station Road north of Oyster Cove while drunk on 1 September 1852. She was 17 or 18 years old.

Mathinna is believed to have been buried in the Oyster Cove Aboriginal cemetery. Her skull was determined to have been among the dozen or so ransacked from that burial ground in the summer of 1908-09 by Sir William Edward Hamilton Crowther and his friend Wendell Inglis Clark. The skulls were stolen as part of program led by eugenicist and professor of anatomy at the University of Melbourne, Dr Richard Berry, to collect Aboriginal skulls for the university's anatomy museum.

Mathinna's skull was subsequently part of the "Crowther Collection" donated to the Tasmanian Museum and Art Gallery. After a campaign by the Tasmanian Aboriginal Centre, all the remains from Oyster Cove were returned and cremated in a four-day ceremony in 1985.

== Legacy ==
The town of Mathinna is named after her, as is the mushroom Entoloma mathinnae.

=== Cultural depictions of Mathinna ===
Mathinna's life has inspired or been mentioned in several literary and dramatic works. These include:

- 1954: Mathinna, a ballet production by Laurel Martyn, one of the first Australian-made works on Australian themes
- 1967: Children's historical fiction book titled Mathinna's People by Nan Chauncy
- 2000: Radio play (BBC, ABC) In Her Father's House, by Carmel Bird
- 2005: Lady Franklin's Revenge, by Ken McGoogan, a non-fiction work about the wife of John Franklin
- 2008: Contemporary piece titled Mathinna choreographed by Stephen Page for the Bangarra Dance Theatre, inspired by the Laurel Martyn work
- 2008: Novel titled Wanting by Richard Flanagan
- 2020: Novel titled The Exiles by Christina Baker Kline
- 2022: A doll given to Mathinna and a pincushion she had made while living with the Franklins were taken away from her in 1843 and stored in England. In 2022 they were returned to Australia and put on display at the Tasmanian Museum and Art Gallery as part of the taypani milaythina-tu: Return to Country exhibition.
- 2024: Mathinna's story, as well as information about her doll and pincushion and their return to Australia, was the subject of an episode in Series 2 of Stuff the British Stole – a coproduction of the Australian Broadcasting Corporation and the Canadian Broadcasting Corporation.

== See also ==
- List of kidnappings
- List of Indigenous Australian historical figures
