= The Sound of One Hand Clapping =

The Sound of One Hand Clapping can refer to:

- "Listen to the sound of one hand", a famous Japanese Zen kōan
- The Sound of One Hand Clapping (novel), a 1997 novel by Richard Flanagan
  - The Sound of One Hand Clapping (film), a 1998 Australian film adaptation
- The Sound of One Hand Clapping, a 1998 album by British musician Dobie, also released as a remix in 2004

== See also ==
- One Hand Clapping (disambiguation)
