= The Unknown Terrorist =

Novel by Richard Flanagan

- Author: Richard Flanagan
- Language: English
- Genre: Novel
- Publisher: Picador
- Publication date: 2006
- Publication place: Australia
- Media type: Print (Hardback & Paperback)
- Pages: 325 pp
- ISBN: 978-0-330-42280-2
- Dewey Decimal: 823.914
- Preceded by: Gould's Book of Fish (2001)
- Followed by: Wanting (novel) (2008)

The Unknown Terrorist is the 2006 fourth novel by the Australian novelist Richard Flanagan.

Writing in The Guardian, Scottish novelist James Buchan described the novel as moving Heinrich Böll's 1974 work The Lost Honour of Katharina Blum into the context of the contemporary Australian city of Sydney.

It was described by the New York Times' Michiko Kakatani as "an armature for a brilliant meditation upon the post-9/11 world".
