= Mathinna =

Mathinna may refer to:

- Mathinna (Tasmanian), a girl from Tasmania
- Mathinna, Tasmania, a small town named after the girl
