= William Buelow Gould =

English and Van Diemonian painter

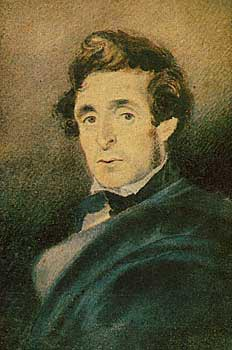
- William Buelow Gould
- Born: William Holland c. 1801 (Note: Date of birth: the date of birth of 1801 is based on information given in the Australian Dictionary of Biography. There is some discrepancy from sources about whether his DOB was instead 1803. As of 30 December 2010 the State Library of Tasmania lists fifty-nine entries for Gould under the 1801 DOB and two entries under the 1803 DOB.); Liverpool, Merseyside, England
- Died: 11 December 1853 (aged 51–52); Hobart, Van Diemen's Land (Tasmania), Australia
- Education: William Mulready, Rudolph Ackermann
- Known for: Painting
- Notable work: Sketchbook of fishes; Still life, fruit; Still life, flowers in a blue jug

William Buelow Gould (c. 1801 – 11 December 1853) was a painter born in the United Kingdom, who died in Van Diemen's Land. He was transported to Australia as a convict in 1827, after which he became one of the most important early artists in the colony, despite consistent conflict with the law, even after his emancipation.

Gould's life in Van Diemen's Land was the subject of the award-winning historical fiction novel Gould's Book of Fish (2001), written by Richard Flanagan, centring on Gould's production of the Sketchbook of fishes. In April 2011 Gould's original Sketchbook of fishes was recognised as a document of world significance by UNESCO.

== Early life ==
Gould was born William Holland in Liverpool, Merseyside, England. While little is known of his early life, it is thought that he received artistic training under Irish painter William Mulready, R.A., in London, and German lithographer Rudolph Ackermann in The Strand, and that he worked in Spode's factory in Stoke-on-Trent, Staffordshire, as a painter of porcelain.

Gould evidently moved around England quite a bit, and on 7 November 1826 he was convicted in Northampton, East Midlands, of having by "force of arms stolen one coat", and was subsequently sentenced to "seven years beyond the seas", a phrase indicating transportation to the then British penal colony of Australia. While the sentence was for the fairly standard term of seven years, as with most convicts, Gould would never return to England. At the time of this conviction, Gould was married and had two children, and had also received a prior conviction for "stealing colours".

== Life in Van Diemen's Land ==
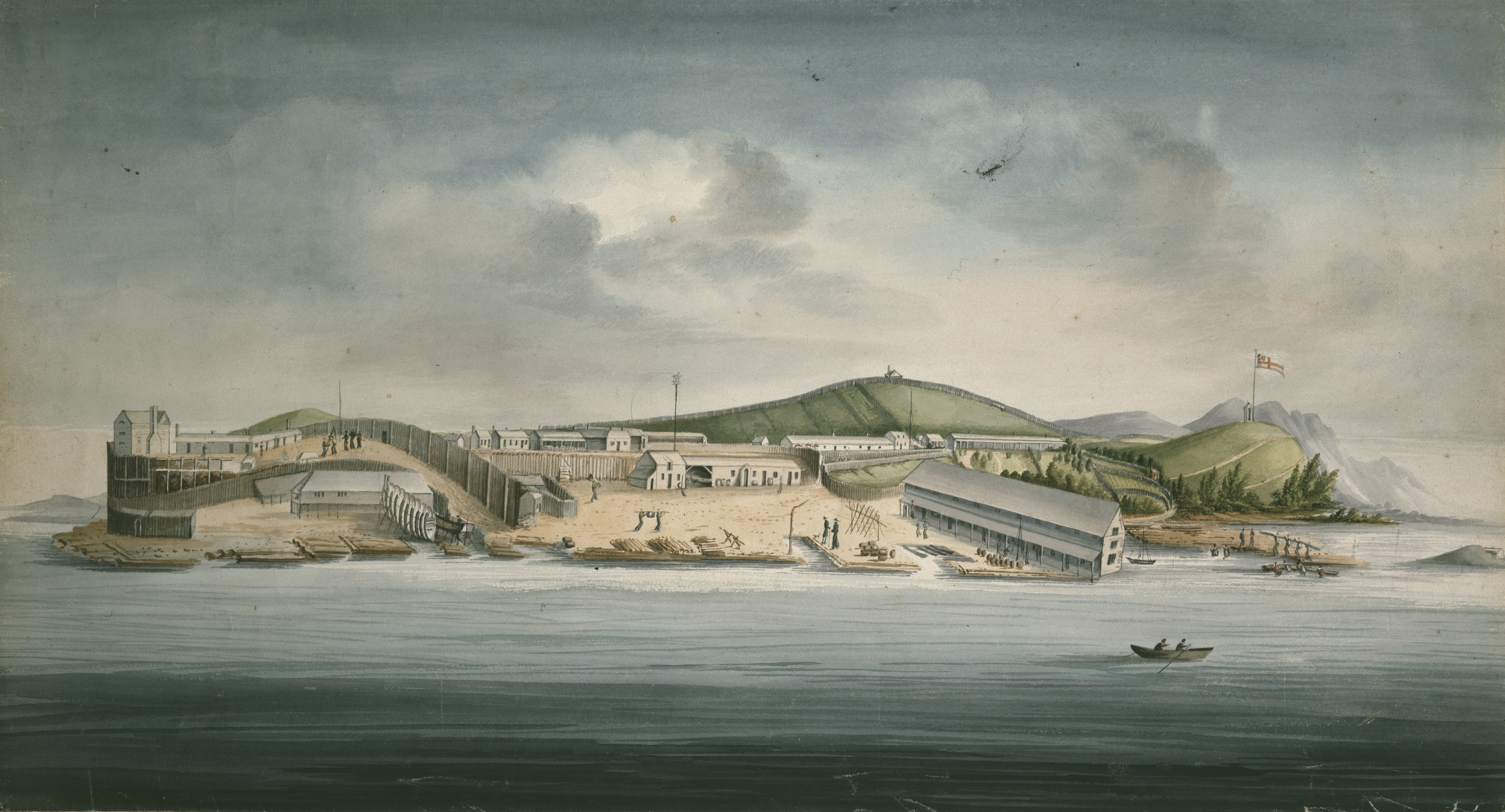
A northeast view of Macquarie Harbour, 1833, W. B. Gould, watercolour

Gould was transported to Australia aboard the convict ship Asia, arriving in Hobart Town, Van Diemen's Land (Tasmania), in December 1827. During the journey he was known to have painted portraits of the officers. Gould was sent to work on the brickfields, but was soon in trouble again, mainly for petty offences involving theft and drunkenness. In June 1829 Gould was sentenced for forgery of a banknote to three years at Macquarie Harbour Penal Station on the west coast of Tasmania, one of the most notoriously harsh penal stations in the colonies, generally reserved for only the worst convicts.

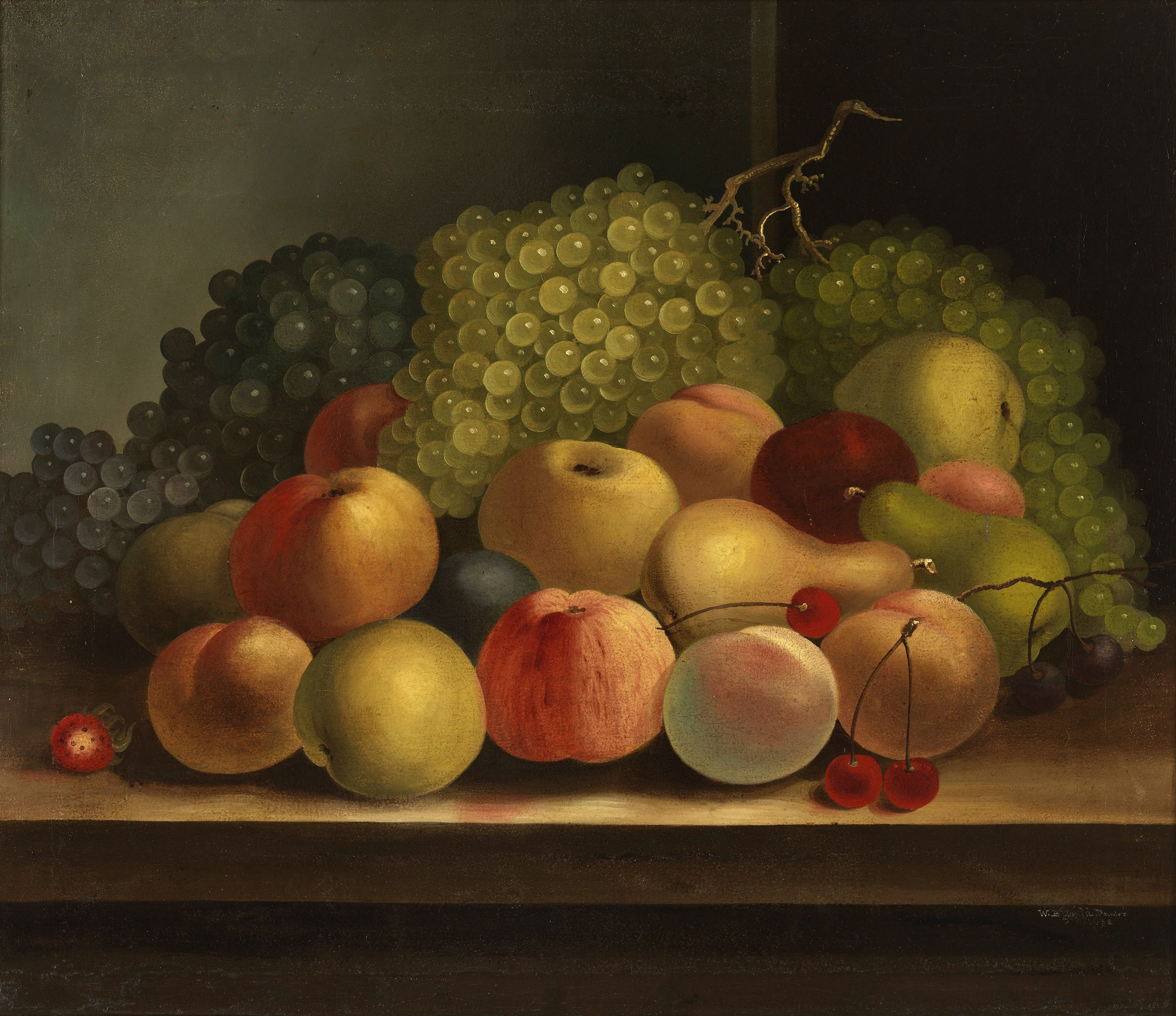
Still life, fruit, (1832). Most likely painted while Gould was working as house servant for Scott

The only access to Macquarie Harbour from Hobart at the time was by ship around the rugged south and west coasts of Tasmania. During the voyage Gould's brig, the Cyprus, became weather bound in the isolated Recherche Bay some 100 kilometres (62 mi) south of Hobart, where half the convicts aboard mutinied and took the ship. Gould was amongst the convicts left marooned along with the officers, and he was one of a party who went overland by foot to seek help. Lieutenant Governor Sir George Arthur commuted the sentences of the convicts who had remained with the officers, and Gould was assigned as a house servant to the colonial surgeon Dr James Scott.

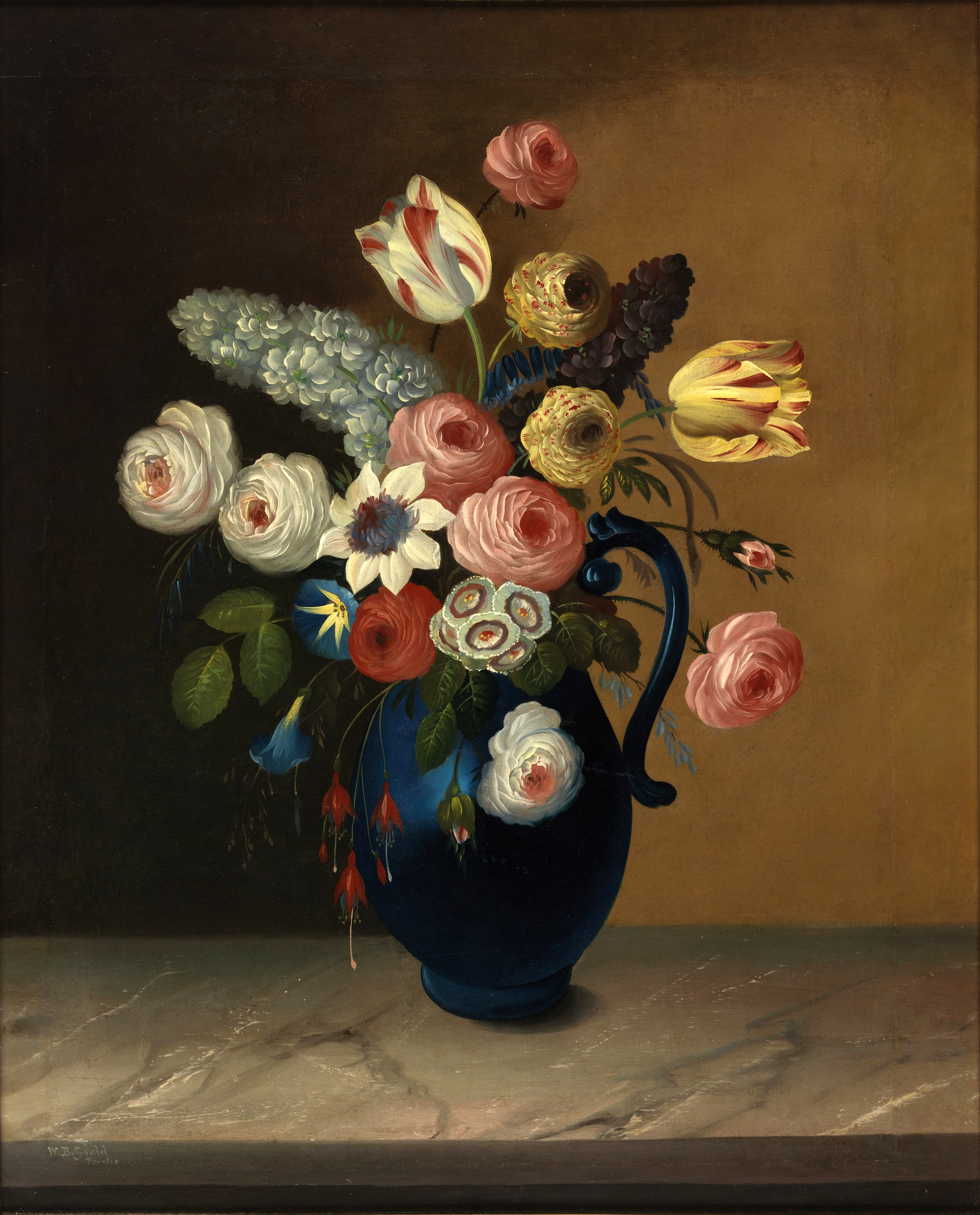
Still life, flowers in a blue jug, (c1840). Painted while a free man

An amateur naturalist, Scott put Gould's artistic talents to use, having him paint watercolours of native flora regarded even today as being of a high technical standard. Gould however would not remain out of trouble, and was again sentenced to Macquarie Harbour in 1832. Based on his reputation from his time with Scott, Gould was assigned as house servant to another amateur natural historian, Dr William de Little on Sarah Island at the penal station. Here he continued with his painting, producing highly accomplished still life watercolours of botanical specimens, birds, fishes, and other sea life collected from the surrounding beaches. His work also included landscape sketches providing important insights into the convict settlement. The Macquarie Harbour settlement was closed in 1833, and along with the other remaining prisoners, Gould was transferred to the Port Arthur Penal Station on the south-east coast of Tasmania.

Gould was granted his Certificate of freedom from Port Arthur on 25 June 1835, and worked briefly for a coachbuilder in Launceston in the north of Tasmania, before returning to Hobart and marrying Ann Reynolds in 1836. While he continued his mainly still life artwork, the quality of the work became variable, and he descended into a cycle of drunkenness, poverty, and prison sentences for theft. Gould died of natural causes at his home on Macquarie Street, Hobart on 11 December 1853.

== Notable works ==
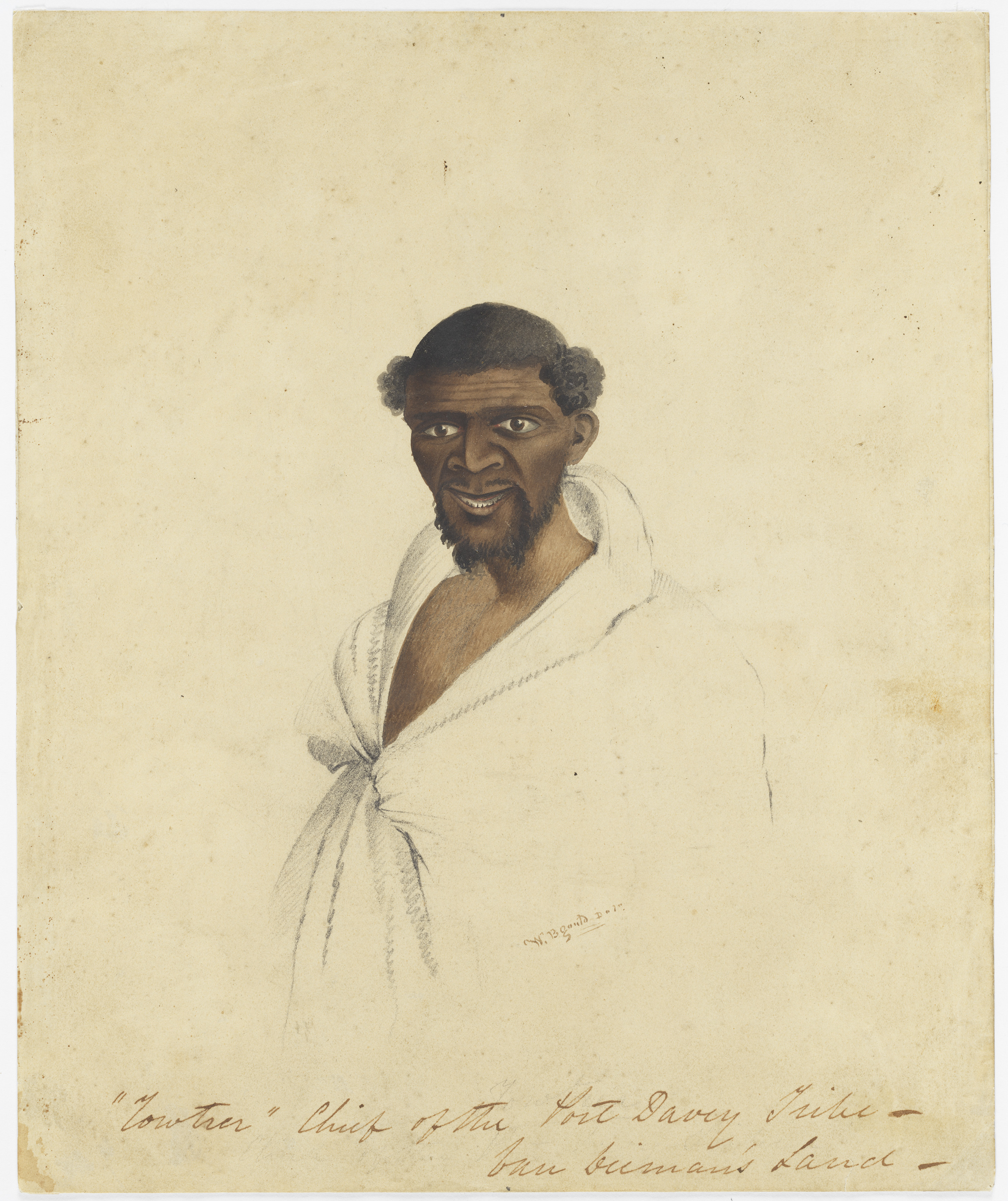
Towterer, from the Port Davey area, Tasmania, c.1833, W. B. Gould

Gould's work is preserved in many galleries around Australia, as well as being held by private collectors. The Queen Victoria Museum and Art Gallery in Launceston holds 177 of his botanical works. A number of works, including a self-portrait, hang in the Tasmanian Museum and Art Gallery in Hobart. His work is also held by the National Gallery of Victoria in Melbourne, Entally National House, Franklin House, Launceston, and Narryna Heritage Museum, Hobart. The State Library of New South Wales holds landscapes in oil and watercolour drawings of Tasmanian Aboriginals, including Towterer of the Port Davey area c.1833.

Some notable and representative works include his Still life, fruit (1832), Sketchbook of fishes (c1832) (see below), Native orchid, Dipodium punctatum (c1830-1840), Still life, game, River scene with aborigines (1838), and Still life, flowers in a blue jug (c1840).

=== Sketchbook of fishes ===
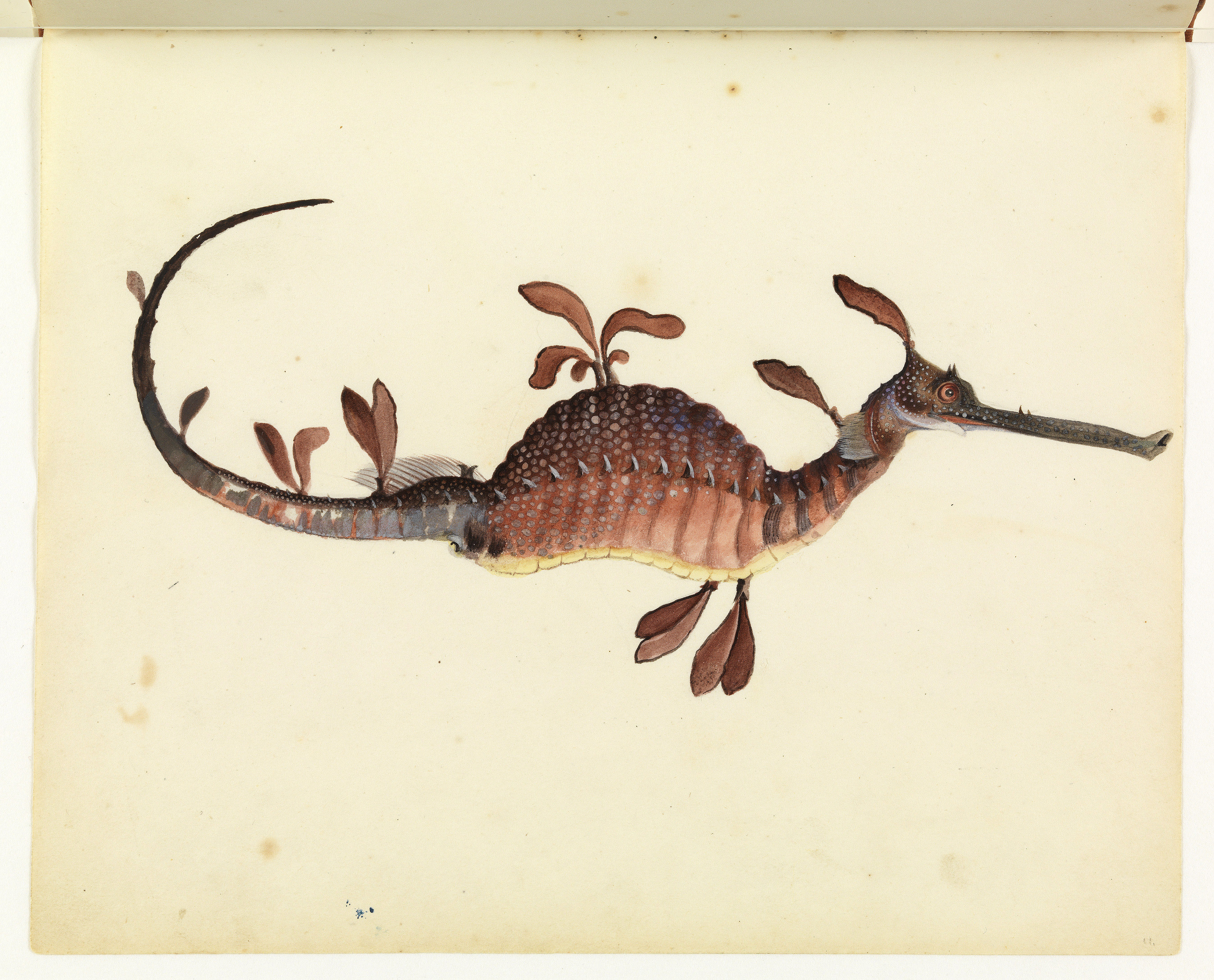
The Leafy sea dragon (actually Common seadragon) from the Sketchbook of fishes, c1832, showing the full sketchbook page and bindings

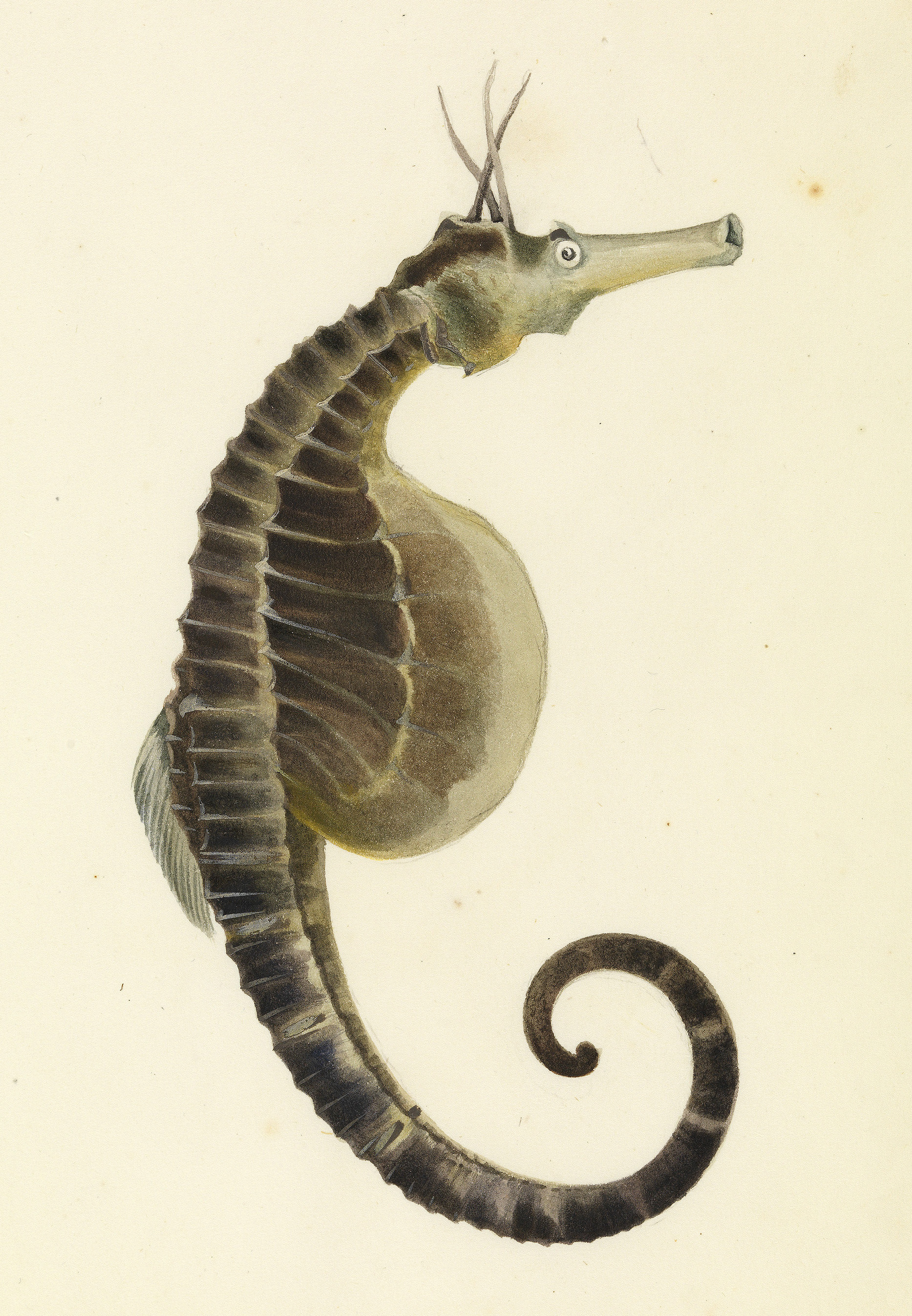
The pot bellied sea horse from the Sketchbook of fishes, c1832

It was around 1832, at Macquarie Harbour Penal Station, that Gould produced his noted Sketchbook of fishes, also known as Gould's sketchbook of fishes, Gould's book of fish, or Sketchbook of Fishes in Macquarie Harbour. This sketchbook consisted of thirty-six separate watercolour-on-paper sketches measuring 185 millimetres (7.3 in) x 227 millimetres (8.9 in) each. While only six of these works are signed by the author, and none are dated, all works are attributed to Gould. The sketchbook includes a numbered list of the fish, with common names written in pencil by G. T. Stilwell, and species names in pencil by A. M. Olsen, who is thought to have formally identified the fish.

The original sketchbook with leather binding and marbled board covers is now held by the Allport Library and Museum of Fine Arts, in the State Library of Tasmania; due to its age and condition it is not available for general access, however a digital version is available on the internet.

This work was made famous in recent times by Tasmanian author Richard Flanagan's critically acclaimed and Commonwealth Writers' Prize winning 2001 novel Gould's Book of Fish: A Novel in Twelve Fish. This book is a fictionalised account of Gould's life in Van Diemen's Land, focussing on his time at Macquarie Harbour and his work on the Sketchbook of fishes. The book includes a reproduction of Gould's Common seadragon painting on the cover (although the actual image used varies depending on the edition), and other works from the sketchbook as the twelve chapter frontispieces. The blurb on the back cover starts with:

Once upon a time, when the earth was still young, before the fish in the sea and all the living things on land began to be destroyed, a man named William Buelow Gould was sentenced to life imprisonment at the most feared penal colony in the British Empire, and there ordered to paint a book of fish.

Another Tasmanian author, Richard Davey, also uses Gould's Common seadragon painting from the Sketchbook of fishes on the cover of his 2002 book, The Sarah Island Conspiracies, as does the Tasmanian Historical Studies issue dedicated to Tasmanian Creativity and Innovation.

==== UNESCO Memory of the World listing ====
Gould's Sketchbook of fishes was inscribed on the UNESCO Australian Memory of the World Register at a ceremony in Hobart on 1 April 2011. This is the equivalent of a World Heritage listing for historic documentary material, recognising the sketchbook as a document of world significance. It was noted that the sketchbook contained the first record of a number of species. A spokesman for the CSIRO stated that current scientists still used information from the sketchbook, adding that little was known today about some of the species that Gould had drawn.

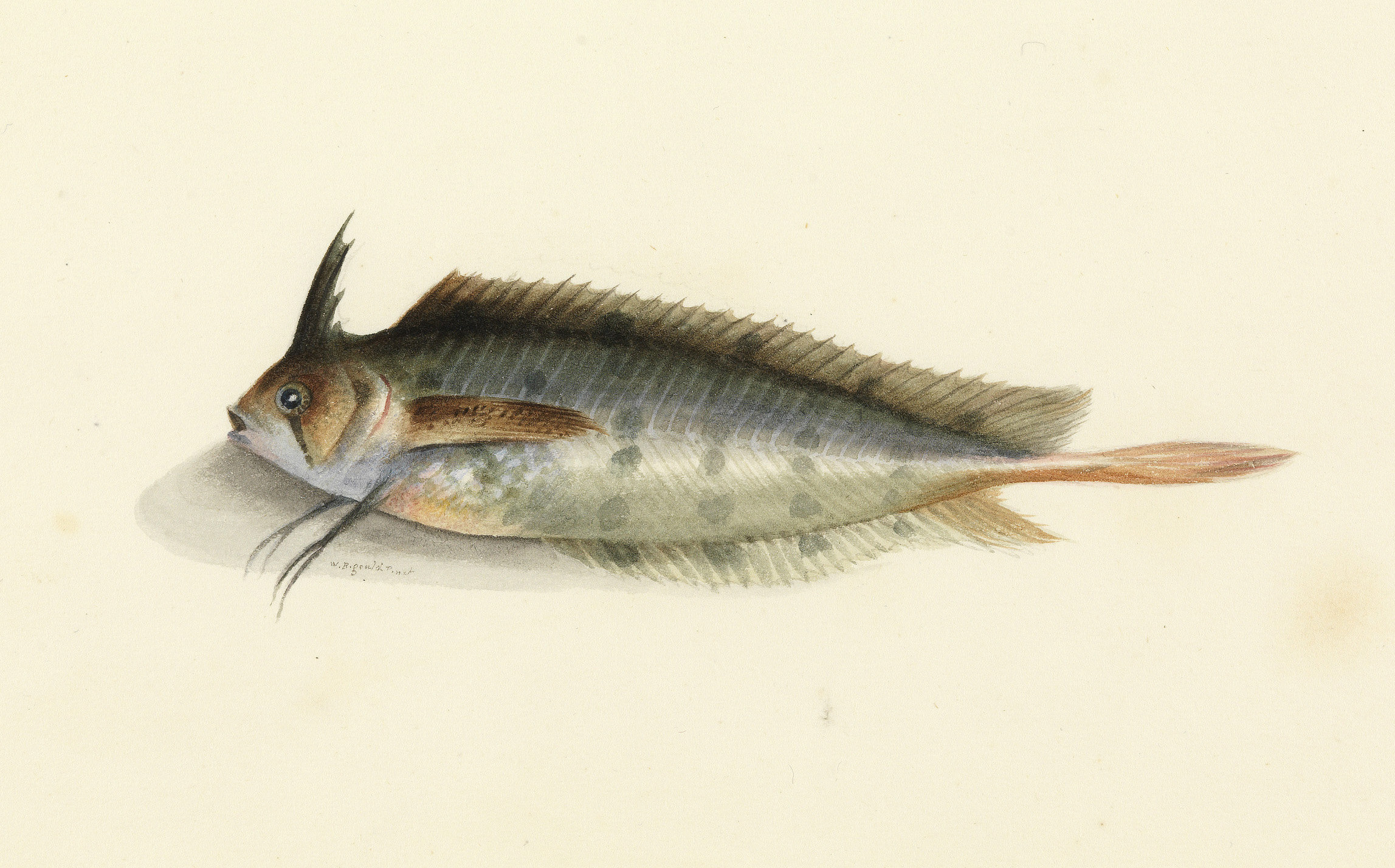
The (Crested) Weed fish

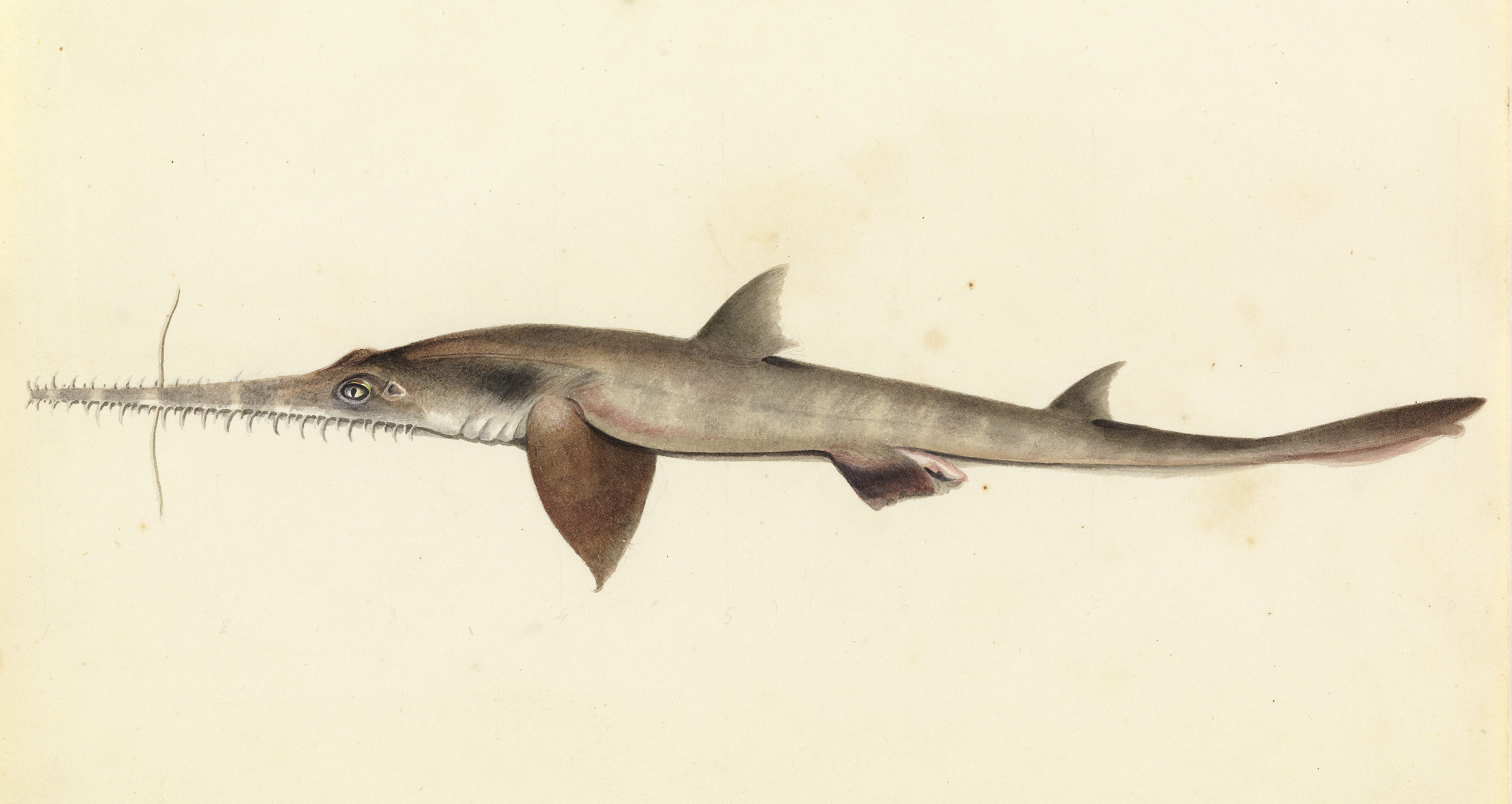
The (Longnose) Saw shark

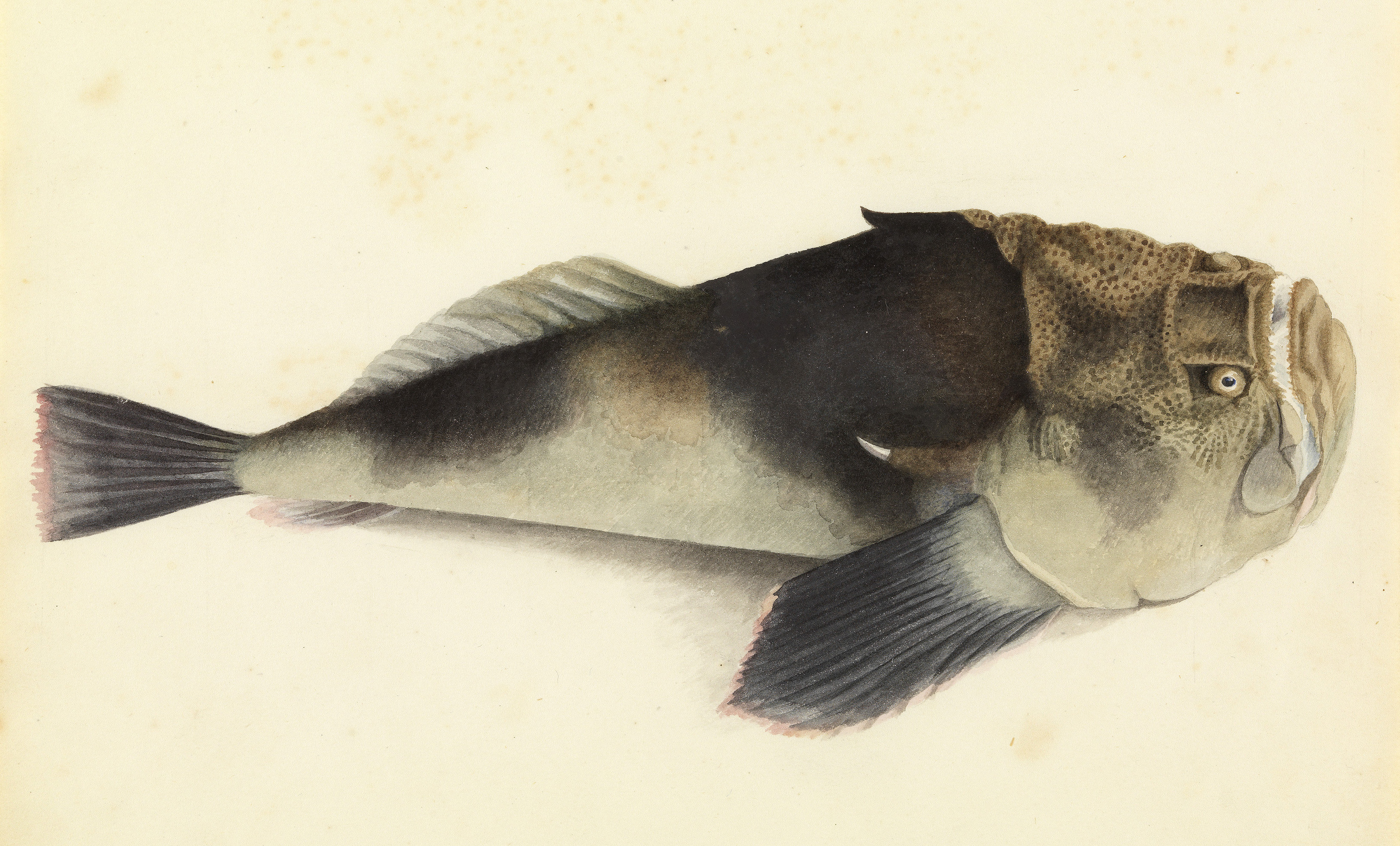
The (Common) Stargazer

Image numbers 20, 25, and 26 from Gould's Sketchbook of fishes, c1832. The weedfish is signed by the author.
All sketchbook and still life images used here with permission of the Allport Library and Museum of Fine Arts, Tasmanian Archive and Heritage Office

== See also ==
- List of convicts transported to Australia
