= Fatal Passage =

2001 book by Ken McGoogan

Fatal Passage: The Untold Story of John Rae, the Arctic Adventurer Who Discovered the Fate of Franklin
- Author: Ken McGoogan
- Language: English
- Genre: Non-fiction
- Publisher: HarperCollins
- Publication date: 2001
- Publication place: Canada

Fatal Passage: The Untold Story of John Rae, the Arctic Adventurer Who Discovered the Fate of Franklin is a book by Canadian historian and writer Ken McGoogan. It was first published in 2001. The book formed the basis for the 2008 movie Passage from the National Film Board of Canada.

== Synopsis ==
In 1854, the explorer John Rae found himself involved with the fate of the Franklin expedition. With the British hoping to be first in the race to discover the Northwest Passage, the news Rae brought of starvation and cannibalism among final survivors set off a firestorm that would eclipse his own incredible accomplishments.

In 1833, nineteen-year-old Rae traveled to Hudson Bay. During his first winter at Moose Factory, he observed the survival techniques of the native peoples. Rae, who was from the Orkney Islands of northern Scotland and had experience in hunting and sailing, explored the Arctic region. He surveyed 1765 miles of territory, traveled 6555 miles on snowshoes, and sailed 6700 miles in small boats. Utilizing the work of previous explorers and accompanied by native people, Métis, and Scots, Rae traveled through both the Arctic and London.

Ultimately, he solved the two great mysteries of nineteenth-century Arctic exploration. Rae discovered both the fate of the lost expedition of Sir John Franklin, which had sailed from England in 1845, and the last navigable link in the Northwest Passage. The first of these discoveries brought down upon him the wrath of the formidable Lady Franklin, who enlisted the help of Charles Dickens, and orchestrated the erasure of Rae from official Arctic history. In Fatal Passage, Ken McGoogan sets the record straight.

== Awards ==
- Drainie-Taylor Biography Prize
- The Canadian Authors' Association History Award
- American Christopher Award.

== Editions ==
- McGoogan, Ken (2002). Fatal Passage: The True Story of John Rae, the Arctic Hero Time Forgot. Toronto, HarperCollins publishers ltd.

== See also ==
- Lady Franklin's Revenge
