= One Hand Clapping =

One Hand Clapping may refer to:

- One hand clapping (phrase), a phrase derived from a Buddhist koan
- One Hand Clapping (Paul McCartney and Wings album), an album and concert film by Paul McCartney and Wings
- One Hand Clapping (novel), a novel by Anthony Burgess
- One Hand Clapping – The Unreleased Demos 2001–2003, an album by Shed Seven
- One-Hand Clapping, a 2001 Danish comedy film written and directed by Gert Fredholm

== See also ==
- The Sound of One Hand Clapping (disambiguation)
