= Death of a River Guide =

Novel by Richard Flanagan

- Cover of 1994 McPhee Gribble paperback edition
- Author: Richard Flanagan
- Cover artist: Design: Beth McKinlay; Illustration: Patrick Hall
- Language: English
- Genre: Novel
- Publisher: McPhee Gribble, Australia
- Publication date: 1994
- Publication place: Australia
- Media type: Print Paperback
- Pages: 326 pp
- ISBN: 0-86914-344-1
- OCLC: 32780236
- Dewey Decimal: 823 20
- LC Class: PR9619.3.F525 D43 1994
- Followed by: The Sound of One Hand Clapping (1997)

Death of a River Guide (1994) is the first novel by Australian author Richard Flanagan.

== Synopsis ==
As Aljaz Cosini lies dying at the bottom of a river in Tasmania he starts to experience a series of flashbacks, forcing him to re-examine his own life.

== Critical reception ==
The reviewer on The Novel Approach website stated: "It's startling (and, quite frankly, a little depressing) to realise that Death of a River Guide is Flanagan's first novel. Not only is he in complete command of the language—in his descriptions of Aljaz's interiority as well as his bountiful descriptions of the Franklin River and its surroundings—but structurally, too, the novel is almost perfect."

In The Canberra Times Marian Eldridge noted the connection between character and landscape: "Land use, convicts, brutality, migration, and racial prejudice all are strands in Aljaz's heritage. When, I wondered, are we going to consider the original inhabitants of this beautiful island? I was not disappointed. What the author has created is a picture of an individual that is also a mosaic of the history of Tasmania."

== Awards ==
- Adelaide Festival Awards for Literature (SA), National Fiction Award, 1996: winner
- Victorian Premier's Literary Award, Shaeffer Pen Prize for First Fiction, 1995: winner
- NBC Banjo Awards, NBC Banjo Award for Fiction, 1995: shortlisted
- Miles Franklin Literary Award 1995: shortlisted

== See also ==
- 1994 in Australian literature

== Notes ==
This novel has been translated into French (2000), Slovenian (2003), Dutch (2003), Spanish (2003), German (2004), Italian (2005), Polish (2017) and Bulgarian (2018).

It has been reported that this novel was inspired by the death in 1985 of Julien Weber, a tour guide who died on the Franklin river at “the cauldron”. Flanagan wrote in his 2023 book, Question 7, that Death of a River Guide was based on his own experience at the age of 21, when he became trapped for several hours in an overturned kayak stuck in the rapids in a submerged air pocket.

== Interviews ==
- "The Write Stuff" - interview by Giles Hugo
