= The Sound of One Hand Clapping (film) =

1996 film

- DVD cover
- Directed by: Richard Flanagan
- Written by: Richard Flanagan
- Produced by: Rolf de Heer
- Starring: Kerry Fox
- Cinematography: Martin McGrath
- Edited by: Tania Nehme
- Music by: Cezary Skubiszewski
- Release date: 23 April 1998
- Running time: 93 minutes
- Country: Australia
- Language: English
- Box office: A$514,678 (Australia)

The Sound of One Hand Clapping is a 1998 Australian drama film directed by Richard Flanagan, based on his 1997 novel of the same name. It was entered into the 48th Berlin International Film Festival. The film was shot in Hobart, Tasmania.

At the ARIA Music Awards of 1998 the soundtrack was nominated for Best Original Soundtrack, Cast or Show Album.

== Cast ==
- Kerry Fox as Sonja Buloh
- Kristof Kaczmarek as Bojan Buloh
- Rosie Flanagan as Sonja, age 8
- Arabella Wain as Sonja, age 3
- Evelyn Krape as Jenja
- Melita Jurisic as Maria Buloh
- Jacek Koman as Picotti
- Essie Davis as Jean
- Regina Gaigalas as Mrs. Michnik (as Gina Gaigalas)
- Julie Forsyth as Mrs. Heaney

== Production ==
Richard Flanagan originally wrote the story as a screenplay but was unable to get it financed. He then adapted it into a novel. This attracted interest from financiers and Flanagan asked Rolf de Heer to direct; de Heer did not feel he was appropriate but said he would produce if Flanagan would do it.
