= Ken McGoogan =

Canadian author

Kenneth McGoogan (born 1947) is the Canadian author of fifteen books, including Flight of the Highlanders, Dead Reckoning, 50 Canadians Who Changed the World, How the Scots Invented Canada, and four biographical narratives focusing on northern exploration and published internationally: Fatal Passage (John Rae), Ancient Mariner (Samuel Hearne), Lady Franklin's Revenge (Jane Franklin), and Race to the Polar Sea (Elisha Kent Kane).

Born in Montreal (1947) and raised in a francophone town, McGoogan has traveled widely, both in Canada and abroad. After attending Sir George Williams University, he earned a bachelor's degree in journalism at Ryerson and a master's degree in creative writing at the University of British Columbia.

For two decades, while producing one nonfiction book and three novels, McGoogan earned his living as a journalist and literary editor, working at The Toronto Star, The Montreal Star, and The Calgary Herald. He has served as a writer-in-residence in Toronto, Fredericton, Dawson City, Hobart (Tasmania) and Stromness (Orkney). He served as chair of the Public Lending Right Commission, sails as a lecturer with Adventure Canada, and writes frequently for Canadian Geographic, Celtic Life International, and the Globe and Mail. He won an award for teaching excellence at the University of Toronto (Continuing Education) and teaches in the MFA program in Creative Nonfiction at the University of King's College/Dalhousie University.

== Awards ==
McGoogan has won the Pierre Berton Award for popular history, the Drainie-Taylor Biography Prize, the Canadian Authors' Association History Award, the Grant MacEwan Author's Award, a University of Cambridge fellowship, the University of British Columbia medal for Canadian biography, and an American Christopher Award for "a work of artistic excellence that affirms the highest values of the human spirit." His book Fatal Passage evolved into an award-winning docudrama, Passage, on which he served as a consultant. McGoogan's 2024 book On Tyranny was shortlisted for the 2024 J.W. Dafoe Book Prize for Canadian history.

== Selected works ==
Searching for Franklin: New Answers to the Great Arctic Mystery, 2023.

Flight of the Highlanders: The Making of Canada, 2019.

Dead Reckoning: The Untold Story of the Northwest Passage, 2017.

Celtic Lightning: How the Scots and the Irish Created a Canadian Nation, 2015.

50 Canadians Who Changed The World, 2014.

50 Canadians Who Changed the World, 2013.

The Arctic Journals of John Rae, ed. 2012

How the Scots Invented Canada, 2010.

Race to the Polar Sea: The Heroic Adventures of Elisha Kent Kane, 2008

Lady Franklin's Revenge: A True Story of Ambition, Obsession and the Remaking of Arctic History, 2005.

Ancient Mariner: The Amazing Adventures of Samuel Hearne, the Sailor Who Walked to the Arctic Ocean, 2003.

Going For Gold. co-authored with Catriona Le May Doan, 2002.

Fatal Passage: The Untold Story of John Rae, the Arctic Adventurer Who Discovered the Fate of Franklin, 2001.

Chasing Safiya, 1999.

Calypso Warrior, 1995.

Visions of Kerouac: A Novel, 1993 (1st press), 1994.

Kerouac's Ghost: A Novel, 1993. (French trans. Le Fantôme de Kerouac)

Canada's Undeclared War: Fighting Words from the Literary Trenches, 1991.
