= Gould's Book of Fish =

Novel by Richard Flanagan

Gould's Book of Fish: A Novel in Twelve Fish
- First edition
- Author: Richard Flanagan
- Cover artist: William Buelow Gould (artwork), Alex Snellgrove (design)
- Language: English
- Publisher: Picador, Pan Macmillan, Australia
- Publication date: 2001
- Publication place: Australia
- Media type: Print Hardback & Paperback
- Pages: 404 pp
- ISBN: 0-330-36303-4
- OCLC: 48471621

Gould's Book of Fish: A Novel in Twelve Fish is a 2001 novel by Tasmanian author Richard Flanagan. Gould's Book of Fish was Flanagan's third novel.

== Plot summary ==
Gould's Book of Fish is a fictionalised account of the convict William Buelow Gould's life both at Macquarie Harbour and elsewhere during his life in Van Diemen's Land.

=== Chapter titles (the twelve fish) ===
1. The Pot-bellied Seahorse
2. The Kelpy
3. The Porcupine Fish
4. The Stargazer
5. The Leatherjacket
6. The Serpent Eel
7. The Sawtooth Shark
8. The Striped Cowfish
9. The Crested Weedfish
10. The Freshwater Crayfish
11. The Silver Dory
12. The Weedy Seadragon

== Artwork ==
The novel is unusual in that it makes use of paintings by the real Van Diemonian convict artist William Buelow Gould reproduced, with permission, from William Gould's Sketchbook of Fishes, held by the Allport Library and Museum of Fine Arts, in the State Library of Tasmania. These images of fish are used both as chapter headings and inspiration for characters. Different editions around the world have used different images of Gould's for their cover.

== Notes ==
- Dedication: "For Rosie, Jean and Eliza, swimming in ever widening rings of wonder."
- Epigraph: "My mother is a fish." – William Faulkner.

== Awards ==
- Commonwealth Writers Prize, South-East Asia and South Pacific Region, Best Book, 2002: winner
- Commonwealth Writers Prize, Overall Best Book Award, 2002: winner
- Miles Franklin Literary Award, 2002: shortlisted
- Victorian Premier's Literary Award, The Vance Palmer Prize for Fiction, 2002: winner
- Booksellers Choice Award, 2001: shortlisted
- Australian Literary Society Gold Medal, 2002

== Reviews ==
- Bedford, James (2019), Colonial Imaginations : Historiographic knowledge in Kate Grenville's The Secret River and Richard Flanagan's Gould's Book of Fish, UNSW, Sydney
- The Christian Science Monitor: "Lowly fish battle Tasmanian devil", Ron Charles, 28 March 2002
- The Guardian "In the hands of madmen", Alex Clark 1 June 2002
- The Daily Telegraph Will Cohu, Deep Down Under
- New York Times Michiko Kakutani, 'A Reborn Criminal Distils Beauty From a Prison's Abominable Depths'
- The Observer "Con fishing", Robert MacFarlane, 26 May 2002
- Australian Book Review Brian Matthews, 'The Ministry of Fish'
