= Lady Franklin's Revenge =

2005 non-fiction book

Lady Franklin's Revenge: A True Story of Ambition, Obsession and the Remaking of Arctic History
- Author: Ken McGoogan
- Publication date: 2005

Lady Franklin's Revenge: A True Story of Ambition, Obsession and the Remaking of Arctic History is a non-fiction book by Canadian historian and writer Ken McGoogan. It was published in 2005.

== Summary ==
Denied a role in Victorian England's male-dominated society, Jane, Lady Franklin took her revenge by seizing control of that most masculine of pursuits, Arctic exploration and shaping its history to her ends. The author, Ken McGoogan, tells two intertwined stories in this book. The first focuses on how Jane Franklin became the greatest woman traveler of the age. She rode a donkey into Nazareth, sailed a rat-infested boat up the Nile, climbed mountains in Africa and the Holy Land, and beat her way through the Tasmanian bush—all at a time when few Victorian women ventured beyond the security of the home, much less beyond the country's borders and the world's known frontiers. The second began when her husband, Sir John Franklin, disappeared into the Arctic in 1845. This book tells the story of how Lady Franklin orchestrated the ensuing twelve-year search, and so ended up contributing more to the discovery and mapping of the Canadian north than any explorer.

== Awards ==
- University of British Columbia Medal for Canadian Biography
- Pierre Berton Award for McGoogan's body of work including Fatal Passage, Ancient Mariner, and Lady Franklin's Revenge (2006).

== Editions ==
- McGoogan, Ken. Lady Franklin's Revenge: A True Story of Ambition, Obsession and the Remaking of Arctic History. Toronto, HarperCollins. 2005

== See also ==
- Fatal Passage
