= The Sound of One Hand Clapping (novel) =

1997 novel by Richard Flanagan

- First edition
- Author: Richard Flanagan
- Language: English
- Publisher: Pan Macmillan, Australia
- Publication date: 1997
- Publication place: Australia
- Media type: Print Hardback & Paperback
- Pages: 425 pp
- ISBN: 0-7329-0896-5
- OCLC: 37931627
- Dewey Decimal: 823 21
- LC Class: PR9619.3.F525 S68 1997
- Preceded by: Death of a River Guide (1994)
- Followed by: Gould's Book of Fish (2001)

The Sound of One Hand Clapping is a 1997 novel by Australian author Richard Flanagan. The title is adapted from the famous Zen kōan of Hakuin Ekaku. The Sound of One Hand Clapping was Flanagan's second novel. The novel tells the story of Slovenian immigrants.

== Plot summary ==
The book focuses the relationship between a woman, Sonja Buloh, and her father Bojan. Bojan is a Slovenian immigrant from the post-World War II period who came to work on the Tasmanian Hydroelectric Schemes, and a drunkard. While working on a remote construction camp in the central highlands in the winter of 1954, when Sonja was just three, Bojan's wife walked into a blizzard never to be seen again and leaving Bojan to raise his daughter. When Sonja returns to visit Tasmania and her father in 1989 as a balanced middle-aged woman, the past begins to intrude, changing both their lives forever.

== Awards ==
- Victorian Premier's Literary Award, Vance Palmer Prize for Fiction, 1998: winner
- Miles Franklin Literary Award, 1998: shortlisted
- Booksellers Choice Award, 1998: winner

== Notes ==
- Dedication: "For Archie Flanagan, Helen Flanagan, Anton Smolej. Forgive me its failings, but I tell it with love."

== Reviews ==
- "CNN.com"
- "Reading Matters"
- "Words and Flavours"

== Interviews ==
- "Many Hands Clapping" - interview by Murray Waldren

== Film adaptation ==
A film adaptation of this novel was released in 1998, directed by the author, Richard Flanagan (who also wrote the screenplay), and featuring Kerry Fox, Kristof Kaczmarek, Rosie Flanagan and Arabella Wain. The film was produced by Rolf de Heer, who encouraged Flanagan to direct the film, and broke into tears and "was a mess for four days" when he first read the script. Flanagan first read the phrase "the sound of one hand clapping" in an essay about feminist influence on the early English co-operative movement. The film competed for the Golden Bear at the 48th Berlin International Film Festival.
