= Certificate of freedom =

Document in colonial Australia

A certificate of freedom was a government issued document given to a convict in one of the Australian penal colonies at the end of the convict's sentence. That stated that the ex-convict had been restored "to all the rights and privileges of free subjects", effectively now a free person, and could seek out employment or leave the colony.

Certificates of freedom were introduced in 1810 and were generally granted to convicts upon application to the Governor after they had served their seven-, ten- or fourteen-year sentence. Convicts who had received a life sentence could receive a pardon but not a certificate of freedom.

There were three classifications given to convicts who were to be given greater freedoms. The first level was the ticket of leave, which still imposed significant restriction upon the individual and could be issued after at least half the original sentence was served. After the entire original sentence was served, a certificate of freedom could be issued with no remaining restrictions upon the individual. A third category was a conditional pardon or full pardon, which were issued to prisoners who had received a life sentence.

The information contained on the certificate usually noted the date, person's name, aliases (if any), ship on which they were transported, year of arrival, when tried and their sentence in years. Certificates from 1827 to 1867 also gave native place, calling, year of birth, physical description and sometimes ticket of leave information.

Certificates comprised two components. The certificate proper was issued to the person named and it was mandatory for the person to carry that document with them at all times. The second component was the "butt"; this was the official copy and was kept on file by the government. The certificates proper are quite rare as they were in constant use by the owner. The "butts" are still retained in archive records and are available for researchers.

A variation on the Certificate of freedom was the colonial certificate of freedom, which related to sentences received for offenses committed after arrival in the colony.

There were approximately 40,000 Certificates of Freedom issued by the Colony of New South Wales. Tasmania and Western Australia also received convicts and issued Certificates of Freedom.

== See also ==
- Ticket of leave
