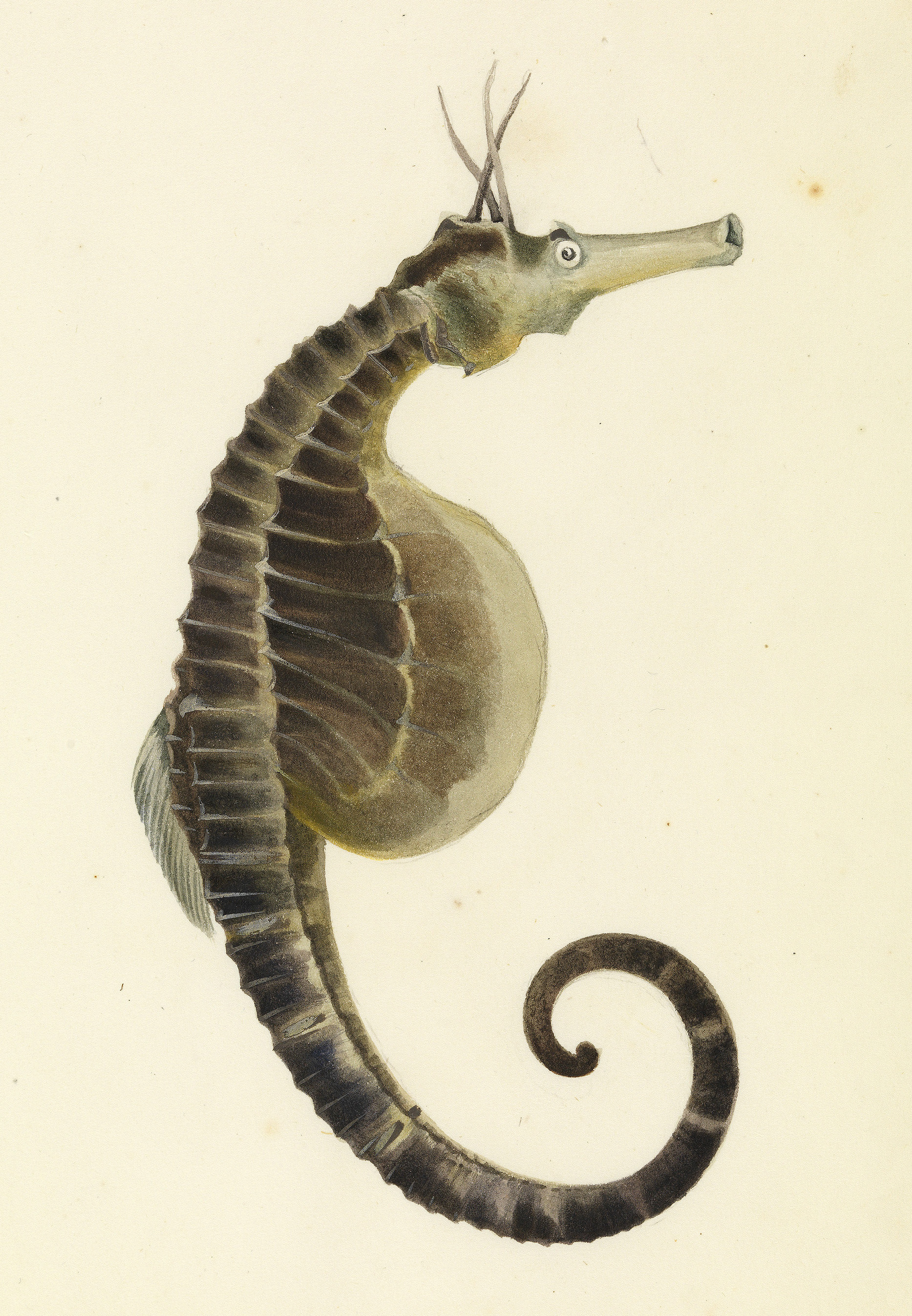
- From the Sketchbook of fishes by William Buelow Gould, 1832

Conservation status
- Least Concern (IUCN 3.1)
- CITES Appendix II

Scientific classification
- Kingdom: Animalia
- Phylum: Chordata
- Class: Actinopterygii
- Division: Teleostei
- Order: Syngnathiformes
- Family: Syngnathidae
- Genus: Hippocampus
- Species: H. abdominalis

Binomial name
- Hippocampus abdominalis Lesson, 1827

Synonyms
- Hippocampus bleekeri Fowler, 1907; Hippocampus agnesae Fowler, 1907; Hippocampus graciliformis McCulloch, 1911

= Big-belly seahorse =

Species of fish

The big-belly seahorse (Hippocampus abdominalis) or pot-bellied seahorse is one of the largest seahorse species in the world, with a length of up to 35 cm (14 in), and is the largest in Australia. Seahorses are members of the family Syngnathidae, and are teleost fishes. They are found in south-eastern Australia and New Zealand, and are listed on Appendix II of CITES. They are the only species of seahorse found in New Zealand, with a habitat range spanning from the Three Kings Island in the north all the way to the Snares Islands in the south.

== Description ==
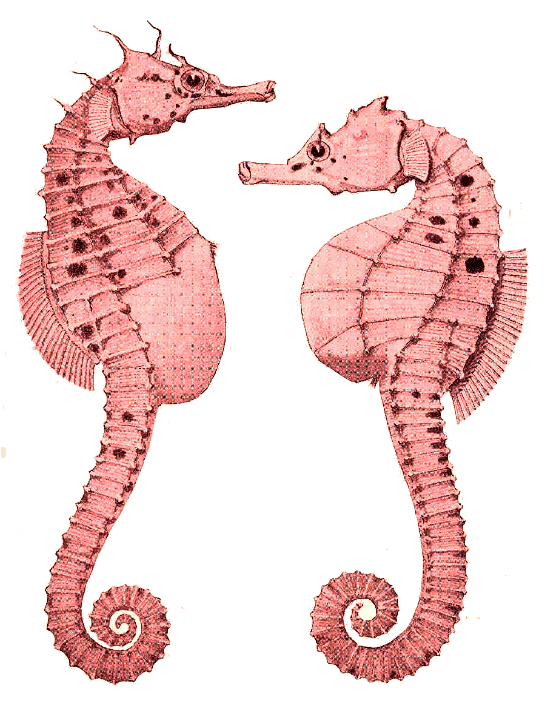
Male (left) and female

Pot-bellied seahorses, Shedd Aquarium

The big-belly seahorse has a forward-tilted, a long-snouted head, a distended but narrow pot belly, and a long, coiled tail. They can be yellow, brown or sometimes white in colouration. It swims using its dorsal fin with a vertical stance; when not swimming, it coils its prehensile tail around any suitable growth, such as seaweed, waiting for planktonic animals to drift by, when they are sucked up by the small mouth set at the tip of the snout much like a vacuum cleaner. Seahorses are voracious feeders, eating mainly crustaceans, such as shrimp, and other small animals living among the seaweed, such as copepods and amphipods. They do not chew, so they can eat to excess because of their small gut tract. Each eye moves separately, making it easier for them to see food and predators.

Distinguishing males from females is simple: The male has a smooth, soft, pouch-like area at the base of its abdomen where the stomach meets the tail on the front side. Males also have a fin there, but it is less obvious. The female has more of a pointed stomach with a very obvious fin at the base of it.

== Habitat ==
Big-belly Seahorses (Hippocampus abdominalis) are found in both South-East Australian and New Zealand waters, typically inhabiting shallow environments such as large rock pools at low tide. They are able to remain motionless amidst seaweed which can be useful to avoid predation. These types of habitats are preferred as they are the most productive for the seahorse's ambush predation strategy Juveniles are pelagic or attached to drifting seaweed, and adults feed on minute crustaceans like copepods and amphipods.

They are nocturnal and ovoviviparous, with the male carrying eggs in a brood pouch located under the tail. These seahorses are often observed in groups at night and can attach to sponges, colonial hydroids, or man-made structures such as jetty piles in deeper water. Typically found in waters less than 50 m (160 ft) deep, they have been observed at depths as great as 104 m (340 ft) Notably, this is the largest seahorse species in southeastern Australia, with more dorsal fin rays and tail rings than any other seahorse.

== Habitat and behavioural ecology ==
=== Habitat selection ===
Juvenile and adult big-belly seahorses, when given a choice, prefer vegetated areas (even with artificial seagrass) over open water. They consistently choose vegetated areas, even when mysid prey is present in adjacent clear water. This preference is linked to their predatory behaviour as they rely on ambush predation.

The density of vegetation also plays a role in the seahorses' foraging success. Increasing vegetation density from low to medium habitat complexity positively impacts the capture success of both juvenile and adult big-belly seahorses who are feeding on mysid swarms. But, juvenile seahorses exhibit a decrease in the number of prey attacks in higher-density vegetation, while adult seahorses show no difference. The number of unsuccessful attacks for juveniles, is possibly due to high vegetation density disrupting prey swarm structures, which can form defensive formations. Large, cohesive prey swarms are more effective against lunging predators, but dense vegetation disrupts their structure, making them more vulnerable to ambush predators like seahorses.

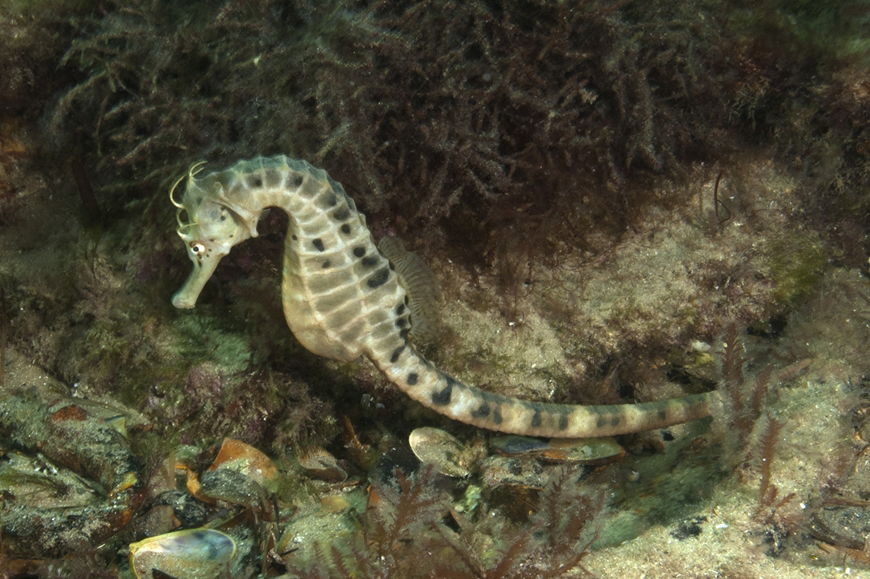
Hippocampus abdominalis, Port Phillip. Photo by Mark Norman / Museum Victoria, CC BY 3.0

Similarly, substrate preference studies revealed a strong preference for substrates with the largest diameter (0.9 mm) and the lowest density (24 mm bar length). Seahorses, known for their prehensile tails, often attach to natural and artificial substrates such as coral and aquaculture nets.

While early juveniles are pelagic in their first month of life, they display attachment to substrates, suggesting a potential preference for specific characteristics. This aligns with earlier findings that emphasize the need for appropriately sized substrates in seahorse rearing to promote optimal distribution and minimise stress.

The use of space in such a complex way also relates to mating systems, suggesting that genetic monogamy in this species arises from factors beyond just the availability of mates, involving intricate ecological and behavioural considerations too.

=== Home ranges ===
A home range refers to the area over which an animal travels, often in search of food or mates. Big-belly seahorse females exhibit larger home ranges and move greater distances than males. Within the species unpaired individuals do not show increased movement compared to those who are paired. The home ranges of pair-bonded individuals tend to overlap significantly more than those of randomly chosen individuals. Both sexes tend to have home ranges that overlap with 6–10 members of the opposite sex; this suggests that mate availability is not a limiting factor for monogamy Body size does not significantly affect home range size or movement patterns of the big-belly seahorse, this challenges the idea that larger individuals would have larger space requirements due to foraging needs or mate searching. Therefore low mate availability does not necessarily drive monogamous behaviour. Ecological factors and the dynamics of pair bonding may influence spatial use and movement patterns among the species.

=== Habitat density effects ===
Juvenile big-belly seahorses have optimised growth at lower densities. Physical interference, such as tail-grasping during feeding, hinders growth and survival at higher densities, with crowding negatively affecting juvenile development. Gender segregation does not significantly impact the growth of sexually mature seahorses, although same-sex courtship behaviours are observed, suggesting that social dynamics among juveniles are more influenced by density than gender. This highlights the importance of managing stocking densities in aquaculture to promote healthy growth and reduce competition during feeding

=== Acclimation and stress within environment ===
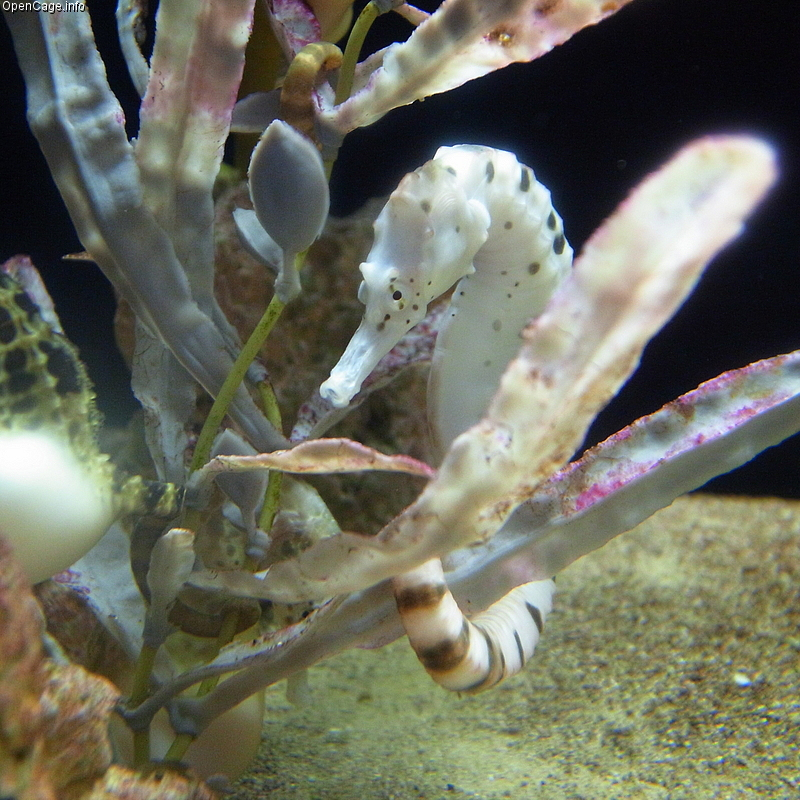
Hippocampus abdominalis in an aquarium. Photo by opencage, CC BY-SA 2.5

Big Belly Seahorses show no typical stress responses (e.g., plasma cortisol, glucose, or lactate) after brief acute stress (60 seconds of air exposure), indicating a lack of adrenergic activation. Chronic stress (e.g., confinement or transportation) significantly raises stress markers but levels return to normal within six hours, showing their capacity for recovery. This rapid recovery suggests tolerance for handling and extended confinement (up to 35 hours) with minimal adverse effects, as indicated by a low mortality rate (1%) during recovery.

By analysing the breathing patterns of seahorses, research has found that seahorses in both wild and captive environments showed an increase in opercular beat rate (gill movements) after being handled. While wild seahorses opercular beats are lower at rest compared to those in captivity, both show a significant increase after manipulation. Suggesting that current captivity protocols should allow for more than 24 hours of acclimation to ensure better recovery.

== Feeding behaviour ==
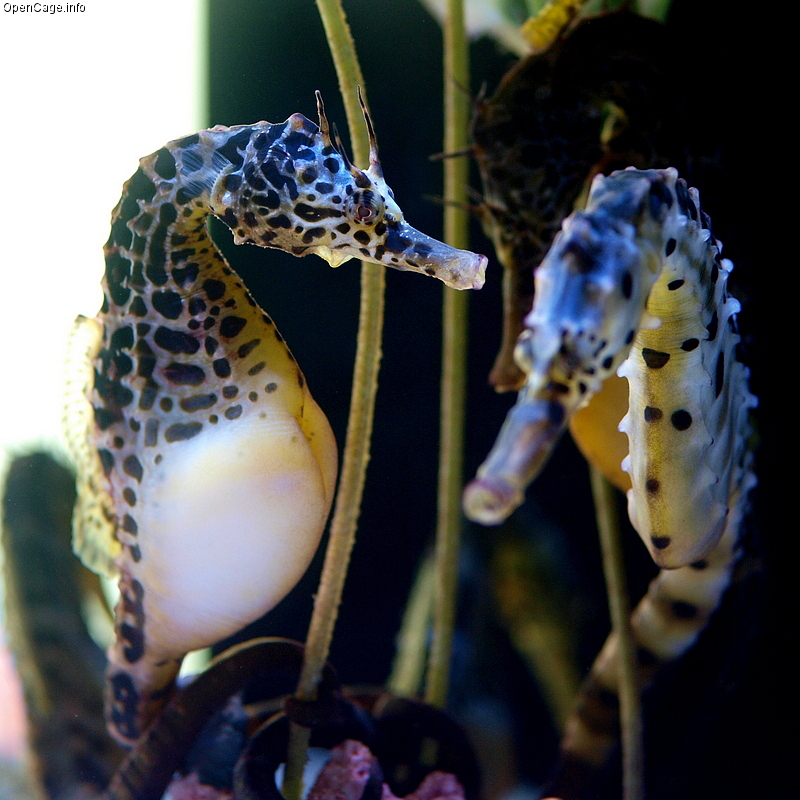
Hippocampus abdominalis pair. Photo by opencage, CC BY-SA 2.5

Adult seahorses eat 30 to 50 times a day if food is available; due to their slow consumption they must feed constantly to survive. Big-belly seahorses do not have a stomach or teeth, so they feed by sucking small invertebrates in through their bony tubular snouts with a flick of their head. Their snouts can expand if the prey is larger than their snout, allowing them to consume a variety of organisms.

They are not able to chew so eat prey whole and then disintegrate their food to eat it. Adult big-belly seahorses have fully developed bony plates, which makes it difficult for many marine predators to ingest them. Big-bellied seahorses also have cryptic colouration and can alter their colour to better camouflage with their surroundings which is beneficial when sneaking up on prey. Their head morphology provides a hydrodynamic advantage, which enables them to approach closely to hydrodynamically sensitive prey, without startling them. They use a pivot-feeding mechanism which is composed of two processes. First, the preparatory phase, where the seahorse slowly approaches prey and flexes its head, this is followed by the expansive phase, during which the seahorse now elevates its head and uses suction to capture the prey. Finally, during the recovery phase, their head and jaws return to their original position.

=== Visual feeding behaviour ===
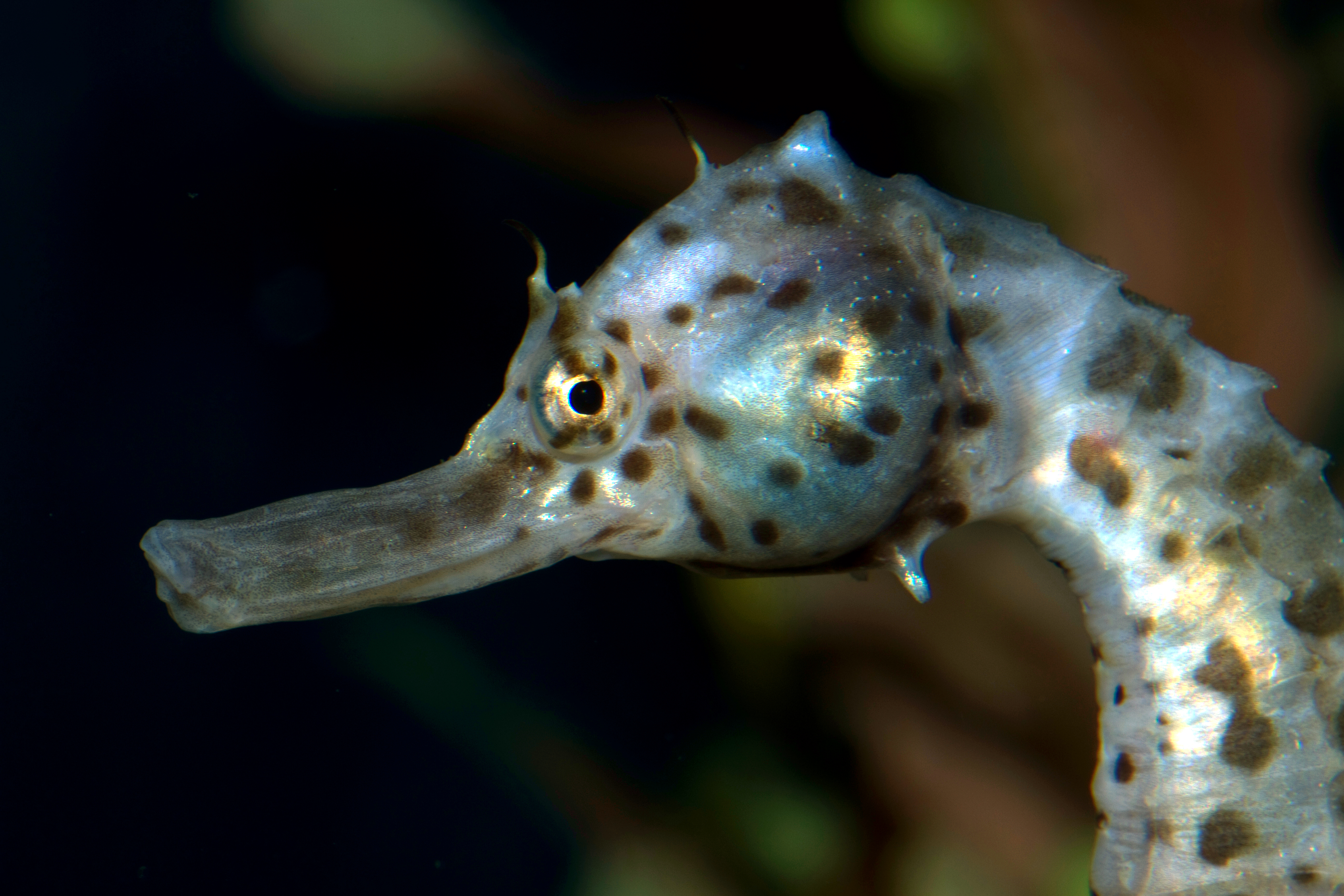
Hippocampus abdominalis head. Photo by Brian Gratwicke, CC BY 2.0

Big-belly seahorses are visually guided feeders whose eyes can move independently. They possess a rod-free convexiclivate fovea, characterized by a calculated visual resolution limit of 5.25 min of arc. Seahorses have adapted their visual systems for efficient prey capturing in varied ecological settings.

=== Acoustic feeding behaviour ===
Female, male and juvenile big-bellied seahorses make "click" sounds while feeding, often paired with a head movement called a "snick". Females click more frequently than males, suggesting a possible link to sexual selection. Click frequency is correlated with body condition, indicating that these sounds may provide clues about the seahorse's size and overall health, helping to signal to potential mates their size, fitness and quality.

== Diet ==
Studies showed that the diet of adult wild big-belly seahorses when living in shallow subtidal macroalgal primarily consists of crustaceans. Key components of the diet of the big-belly seahorse include amphipods (such as caprellid and ischyrocerid amphipods), caridean shrimp (Hippolyte bifidirostris), and peracarids like the mysid (Tenagomysis similis). There are no significant differences between the diets of male and female big-belly seahorses. However, smaller seahorses were found to consume more crustaceans than larger ones, due primarily to the higher proportion of amphipods in their gut contents. Seasonal variations are also apparent, with amphipod consumption being the highest during spring and summer, while decapod consumption is at its lowest in autumn.

Further research into the impact of varying feed ratios of frozen mysids (Amblyops kempii) on their growth and survival revealed no significant differences in standard length after three months. However, big-belly seahorses fed higher rations (10–20% of wet body weight) had greater body weights and higher condition factors. The most cost-effective feeding strategy, based on the total mysids offered, was the 5% ration, with survival rates remaining at 100% across all treatments. Therefore, it is recommended to maintain a daily feed ratio of 5–10% wet body weight of frozen mysids for optimal growth in big-belly seahorse aquaculture.

Similarly, when fed diets consisting of live enriched Artemia (brine shrimp), frozen mysids (Amblyops kempi), or a combination of both there were no observed differences in seahorse length, wet weight, condition factor, or food conversion ratios among the treatments. However, the specific growth rate was higher for the Artemia-only group. Despite frozen mysids having higher levels of eicosapentaenoic acid (EPA) and docosahexaenoic acid (DHA), this did not result in improved growth. Frozen mysids are still considered a viable alternative to live Artemia in seahorse diet in aquaculture, potentially reducing costs and improving survival rates in the aquarium trade.

== Reproduction ==
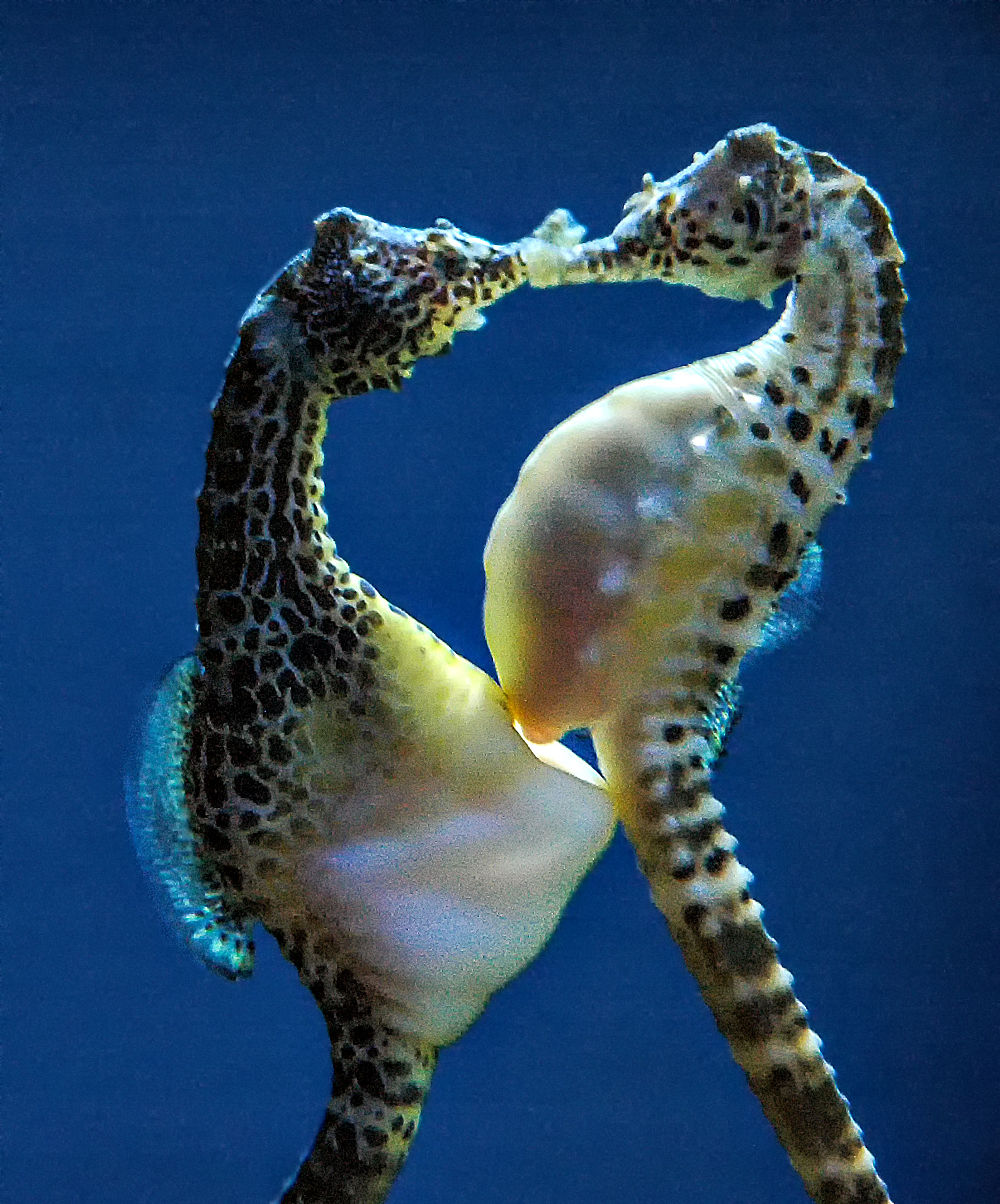
Hippocampus abdominalis mating (cropped retouched). Photo by Elizabeth Haslam, CC BY 3.0

In the wild, breeding can commence when the seahorses are about one year old, and this can be reduced to about eight months when in captivity. Breeding in big-belly seahorses occurs year-round, with peaks in the warmer months.

Courtship initiation involves a series of colour changes and postural displays. Dilating the opening of the brood pouch slightly, the male inflates the pouch to balloon-like proportions with water by swimming forwards, or by pushing his body forwards in a pumping action, then closing the pouch opening. At the same time, he lightens his pouch in colour to white or light yellow. The male also brightens his overall body colouration, typically intensifying the yellow. A male repeatedly approaches his selected female with his head tucked down, and dorsal and pectoral fins rapidly fluttering.

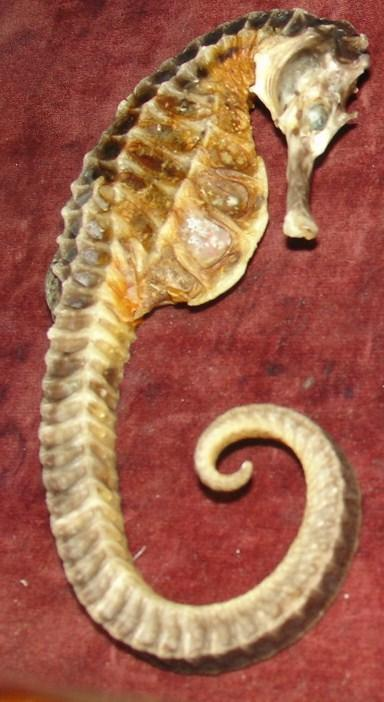
A dried big-belly seahorse specimen

If the female is not receptive, she ignores the male, which then looks for another potential mate. If no females are receptive, the male stops displaying and deflates the pouch by dilating the pouch opening and bending forwards, expelling the water inside. If a female is receptive to a courting male, she reciprocates with her own color changes and head tucking, typically intensifying the lighter colours such as yellow and white, highlighting the contrast between these colours and her overall darker blotching and banding patterning. A series of short bursts of swimming together in tandem then ensues, sometimes with tails entwined, or with the female tightly rolling her tail up. This has often been described as 'dancing'. After coming to rest, the male attempts to get the female to swim towards the water surface with him by repeatedly pointing his snout upwards.

If the female responds by also pointing her snout upwards, then the final stage of courtship follows. This involves both the male and female swimming directly upwards towards the water surface with both their heads pointing upwards and tails pointing straight down. If they reach the water surface, one or both seahorses can often be seen and heard to snap their heads. To transfer her eggs to the male, the female faces the male, slightly above him. Pressing the base of her abdomen against the male's pouch, she then squirts her eggs through the opening in the front of his dilated pouch.

The male seahorse brood 300–700 young at a time, and can have up to four broods in summer. Their colouring is a variable shade of brown, mottled with yellow-brown and with darker splotches. The tail is often circled with yellow bands. In deeper water where the tail is anchored to other colourful forms of life, such as sponges and hydroids, they often take on these colours.

== Aquaculture ==
The big-belly seahorse is a popular aquarium species and dried specimens are sold as traditional medicine in Asia. Stocks come from the wild or are aquarium-reared. They are easy to keep in aquariums and feed on small shrimp and crustaceans.
