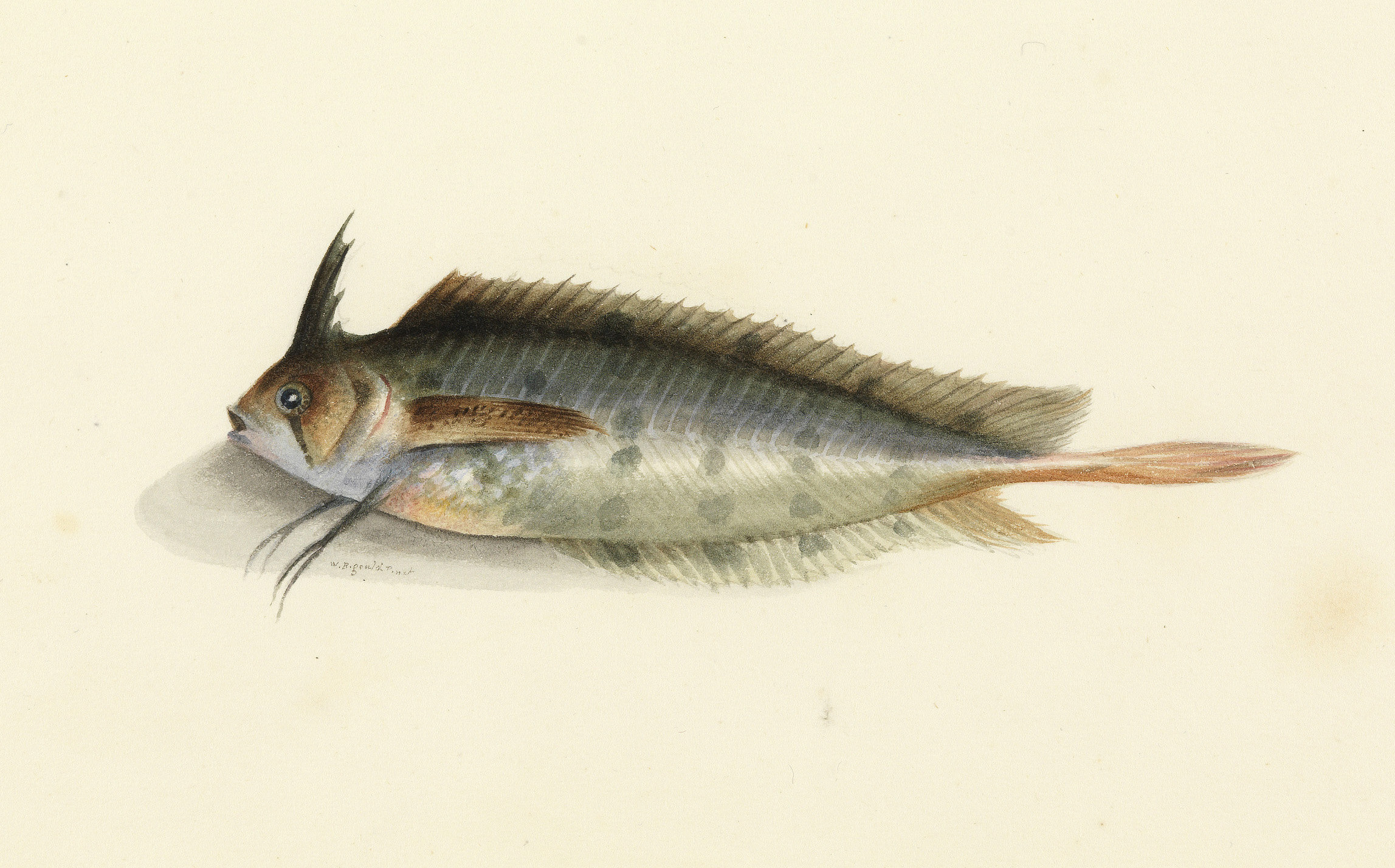
- Illustration from the Sketchbook of fishes by William Buelow Gould

Conservation status
- Least Concern (IUCN 3.1)

Scientific classification
- Kingdom: Animalia
- Phylum: Chordata
- Class: Actinopterygii
- Order: Blenniiformes
- Family: Clinidae
- Genus: Cristiceps
- Species: C. australis

Binomial name
- Cristiceps australis Valenciennes, 1836

Synonyms
- Cristiceps axillaris J. Richardson, 1846; Cristiceps splendens Castelnau, 1872; Cristiceps howittii Castelnau, 1873; Cristiceps macleayi Castelnau, 1879; Cristiceps pallidus W. J. Macleay, 1881

= Cristiceps australis =

Species of fish

Cristiceps australis, the crested weedfish, is a species of clinid found around southern Australia in the subtidal zone from low water to depths of about 30 metres (98 ft) preferring areas with plentiful seaweed growth. This species can reach a length of 18 centimetres (7.1 in) TL.

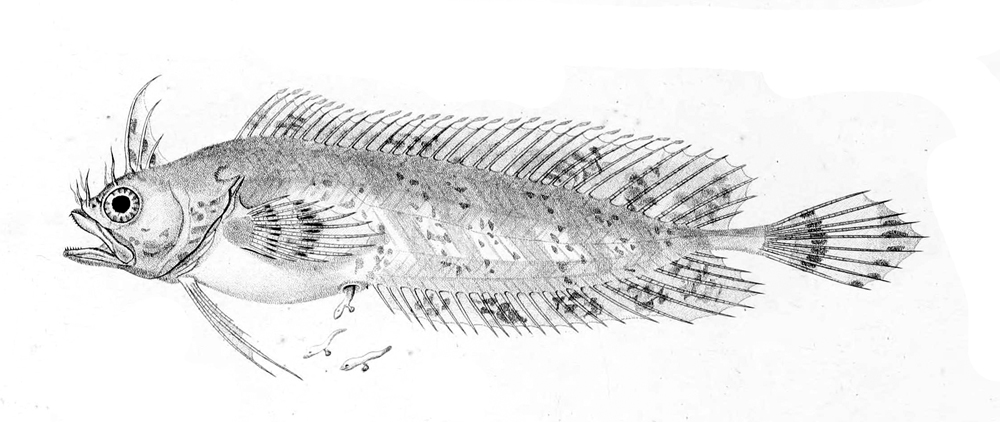
