= Richard Flanagan =

Australian novelist

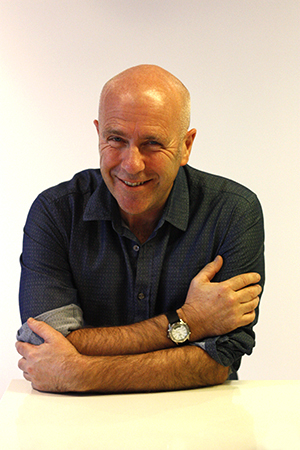
- Born: Richard Miller Flanagan; 1 July 1961 (age 65); Longford, Tasmania, Australia
- Education: University of Tasmania; Worcester College, Oxford
- Years active: 1985–present
- Spouse: Majda Smolej
- Children: 3
- Relatives: Martin Flanagan (brother)
- Awards: Man Booker Prize

Richard Miller Flanagan (born 1961) is an Australian writer, who won the 2014 Man Booker Prize for his novel The Narrow Road to the Deep North and the 2024 Baillie Gifford Prize for Question 7, making him the first writer in history to win both Britain's major fiction and non-fiction prizes. "Considered by many to be the finest Australian novelist of his generation" according to The Economist, Flanagan has also worked as a film director and screenwriter.

== Early life and education ==
Flanagan was born in Longford, Tasmania, in 1961, the fifth of six children. He is descended from Irish convicts transported to Van Diemen's Land during the Great Famine in Ireland. Flanagan's father was a survivor of the Burma Death Railway and one of his three brothers is Australian rules football journalist Martin Flanagan.

Flanagan was born with severe hearing impairment, which was corrected when he was six years old. He grew up in the remote mining town of Rosebery on Tasmania's western coast.

Flanagan left school at the age of 16 but returned to study at the University of Tasmania, where he graduated with a Bachelor of Arts with First-Class Honours. Flanagan was president of the Tasmania University Union in 1983. The following year, he was awarded a Rhodes Scholarship to attend Worcester College, Oxford, where he earned the degree of Master of Letters in History.

In his early twenties, Flanagan worked as a guide for tourists kayaking on the Franklin River. At the age of 21 he had a near-death experience when his kayak overturned in rapids, became wedged in rocks and trapped Flanagan in an air pocket, where he remained submerged and stuck for hours before being rescued. This experience formed the basis of his first novel Death of a River Guide and was also recounted in his non-fiction book Question 7.

== Early works ==
Flanagan wrote four non-fiction works before moving to fiction, works that he called "his apprenticeship". One of these was Codename Iago, an autobiography of Australian con man John Friedrich, which Flanagan ghostwrote in six weeks to make money to write his first novel. Friedrich killed himself in the middle of the book's writing and it was published posthumously. Simon Caterson, writing in The Australian, described it as "one of the least reliable but most fascinating memoirs in the annals of Australian publishing".

== Novels ==
Flanagan's first novel, Death of a River Guide (1994), is the tale of Aljaz Cosini, a river guide, who lies drowning, reliving his life and the lives of his family and forebears. It was described by The Times Literary Supplement as "one of the most auspicious debuts in Australian writing". The Sound of One Hand Clapping (1997), tells the story of Slovenian immigrants and was a major bestseller, selling more than 150,000 copies in Australia. Flanagan's first two novels, declared Kirkus Reviews, "rank with the finest fiction out of Australia since the heyday of Patrick White".

Gould's Book of Fish (2001) is based on the life of William Buelow Gould, a convict artist, and tells the tale of his love affair with a young black woman in 1828. It won the 2002 Commonwealth Writers' Prize. Flanagan described these early novels as 'soul histories'. The Unknown Terrorist (2006), was described by The New York Times as "stunning ... a brilliant meditation upon the post-9/11 world". Wanting (2008) tells two parallel stories: about the novelist Charles Dickens in England, and Mathinna, an Aboriginal orphan adopted by Sir John Franklin, the colonial governor of Van Diemen's Land, and his wife, Lady Jane Franklin. As well as being a New Yorker Book of the Year and Observer Book of the Year, it won the Queensland Premier's Prize, the Western Australian Premier's Prize and the Tasmania Book Prize. The Narrow Road to the Deep North (2013), about a Tasmanian doctor who becomes a Japanese prisoner of war, won the 2014 Man Booker Prize. The Washington Post wrote that "If you read "The Narrow Road to the Deep North" you'll understand that Flanagan is one of our greatest living novelists".

First Person (2017), based loosely on his experience early in his writing career ghost-writing the autobiography of John Friedrich. The New Yorker noted "the novel, with its switchbacking recollections and cyclical dialogue, its penetrating scenes of birth and, eventually, death, is enigmatic and mesmerizing" while the New York Review of Books called it a "tour-de-force".

The Living Sea of Waking Dreams (2020) about a woman caring for her dying mother during Australia's Black Summer of climate change induced wildfires, was described in a review for The Sydney Morning Herald as "a revelation and a triumph . . . astonishing".

Robert Dixon's (ed.) Richard Flanagan: Critical Essays (2018) offers different perspectives on Flanagan's writing, while Joyce Carol Oates has written an overview of his novels for the New York Review of Books where she described Flanagan as "among the most versatile writers in the English language".

== Non-fiction ==
Flanagan has written on literature, the environment, art and politics for the Australian and international press including Le Monde, The Daily Telegraph (London), Suddeutsche Zeitung, The Monthly, The New York Times, and the New Yorker. Some of his writings have proved controversial. "The Selling-out of Tasmania", published after the death of former premier Jim Bacon in 2004, was critical of the Bacon government's relationship with corporate interests in the state. Premier Paul Lennon declared, "Richard Flanagan and his fictions are not welcome in the new Tasmania". Flanagan's 2007 essay on logging company Gunns, then the biggest hardwood woodchipper in the world, "Gunns. Out of Control" in The Monthly, first published as "Paradise Razed" in The Telegraph (London), inspired Sydney businessman Geoffrey Cousins' high-profile campaign to stop the building of Gunns' two billion dollar Bell Bay Pulp Mill. Cousins reprinted 50,000 copies of the essay for letterboxing in the electorates of Australia's environment minister and opposition environment spokesperson. Gunns subsequently collapsed with huge debt, its CEO John Gay found guilty of insider trading, and the pulp mill was never built. Flanagan's essay won the 2008 John Curtin Prize for Journalism.

A collection of his non-fiction was published as And What Do You Do, Mr Gable? (2011).

In 2015 he published Notes on an Exodus, on the Syrian refugee crisis, arising out of visiting refugee camps in Lebanon, Greece, and meeting refugees in Serbia. The book also features sketches made by the noted Australian artist Ben Quilty, who travelled with Flanagan to meet the refugees.

His 2021 book Toxic. The Rotting Underbelly of the Tasmanian Salmon Industry has been credited with lifting 'the veil on the Atlantic salmon industry's environmental and social malfeasances' and igniting popular opposition to the industry.

In 2024, his book Question 7, which had also been long listed for the Prix Medicis and shortlisted for the Prix Femina as a novel, won the GBP 50,000 (AUD 97,000) Baillie Gifford prize for Non-Fiction, making him the first author to win both the Booker and Baillie Gifford prizes. Flanagan said that he would not accept the prize money until Baillie Gifford shared with the public a plan showing how they will decrease their investment in fossil fuel extraction and increase their investment in renewable energy. On 1 October 2025, The Times reported that Flanagan had "turned down his winnings after the sponsor refused calls to divest from fossil fuels".

== Film ==
The 1998 film of The Sound of One Hand Clapping, written and directed by Flanagan, was nominated for the Golden Bear at that year's Berlin Film Festival.

He worked with Baz Luhrmann as a writer on the 2008 film Australia.

A major television series of The Narrow Road to the Deep North, directed by Justin Kurzel (Snowtown, Macbeth, The Order) and starring Jacob Elordi (Euphoria, Priscilla, Saltburn) screened at the 2025 Berlin Film Festival where The Hollywood Reporter described it as having "received gushing praise from critics. It has been acquired by the BBC for screening on BBC One and BBC iPlayer.

== Personal life ==
Flanagan is an ambassador for the Indigenous Literacy Foundation, to which he donated his $40,000 prize money on winning the Australian Prime Minister's Literary Prize in 2014. A painting of Richard Flanagan by artist Geoffrey Dyer won the 2003 Archibald Prize. A rapid on the Franklin River, Flanagan's Surprise, is named after him. He was made an Honorary Citizen of Oxford, Mississippi, the home town of William Faulkner, in 2014. The Tasmanian Museum and Art Gallery mounted an exhibition in 2024 of five monumental sculptural pieces by Tasmanian artist, master furniture-maker and wood craftsman, Kevin Perkins, each piece inspired by one of Flanagan's novels.

Flanagan lives in Hobart, Tasmania with his Slovenian-born wife Majda (née Smolej) and has three daughters, Rosie, Jean and Eliza.

His life was the subject of a BAFTA award-winning BBC documentary, Life After Death.

== Works ==
=== Novels ===
- Death of a River Guide (1994)
- The Sound of One Hand Clapping (1997)
- Gould's Book of Fish: A Novel in Twelve Fish (2001)
- The Unknown Terrorist (2006)
- Wanting (2008)
- The Narrow Road to the Deep North (2013)
- First Person (2017)
- The Living Sea of Waking Dreams (2020)

=== Non-fiction ===
- (1985) A Terrible Beauty: History of the Gordon River Country
- (1990) The Rest of the World Is Watching: Tasmania and the Greens (co-editor)
- (1991) Codename Iago: The Story of John Friedrich (co-writer)
- (1991) "Parish-Fed Bastards": A History of the Politics of the Unemployed in Britain, 1884–1939
- (2011) And What Do You Do, Mr Gable?
- (2015) Notes on an Exodus
- (2018) Seize the Fire: Three Speeches
- (2021) Toxic: The Rotting Underbelly of the Tasmania Salmon Industry
- (2023) Question 7

=== Films ===
- (1998) The Sound of One Hand Clapping (director and screenwriter)
- (2008) Australia (co-writer)

== Awards and honours ==
- (1996) National Fiction Award for Death of a River Guide
- (1995) Victorian Premier's Prize for Best First Fiction (for Death of a River Guide)
- (1998) National Booksellers award for Best Book for The Sound of One Hand Clapping
- (1998) Victorian Premier's Prize for Best Novel, for The Sound of One hand Clapping
- (2002) Australian Literature Society Gold Medal (for Gould's Book of Fish: A Novel in Twelve Fish)
- (2002) Victorian Premier's Prize for Fiction for Gould's Book of Fish: A Novel in Twelve Fish
- (2002) The Commonwealth Writers' Prize (for Gould's Book of Fish: A Novel in Twelve Fish)
- (2008) Western Australian Premier's Literary Award for Fiction (for Wanting)
- (2009) Queensland Premier's Literary Award for Fiction (for Wanting)
- (2011) Tasmania Book Prize (for Wanting)
- (2014) Western Australian Premier's Literary Award for Fiction (for The Narrow Road to the Deep North)
- (2014) Queensland Premier's Literary Award for Fiction (for The Narrow Road to the Deep North)
- (2014) The Man Booker Prize for Fiction (for The Narrow Road to the Deep North)
- (2014) Australian Prime Minister's Literary Prize (for The Narrow Road to the Deep North)
- (2015) Margaret Scott Prize (for The Narrow Road to the Deep North)
- (2016) The Athens Prize for Literature (for The Narrow Road to the Deep North)
- (2016) Lire Prix du meilleur livre étranger (for The Narrow Road to the Deep North)
- (2019) Honorary Fellow of the Australian Academy of the Humanities (FAHA)
- (2020) Honorary Fellow of the Modern Languages Association
- (2024) Baillie Gifford Prize (for Question 7)
