= Wanting (novel) =

2008 novel by Richard Flanagan

- First edition
- Author: Richard Flanagan
- Language: English
- Publisher: Knopf, Australia
- Publication date: 2008
- Publication place: Australia
- Media type: Print Hardback & Paperback
- Pages: 256 pp
- ISBN: 978-1-74166-655-7
- OCLC: 270765982
- Dewey Decimal: A823.3 22
- LC Class: PR9619.3.F525 W36 2008
- Preceded by: The Unknown Terrorist (2006)

Wanting is a 2008 novel by Australian author Richard Flanagan.

== Plot summary ==
Wanting cuts between two stories based on real historical figures under the central theme of 'wanting' and is set in both nineteenth century Tasmania and Britain. One tells the tale of an Aboriginal child, Mathinna, adopted by then governor of Van Diemen’s Land, Sir John Franklin and his wife Lady Jane; the other of Charles Dickens’ love affair with Ellen Ternan after one of his daughters dies.

== Reception ==
Many critics regarded Wanting as one of the best novels of the year.

== Notes ==
- Dedication: "For Kevin Perkins".
- Epigraph: "You see, reason, gentlemen, is a fine thing, that is unquestionable, but reason is only reason and satisfies only man's reasoning capacity, while wanting is a manifestation of the whole of life." Fyodor Dostoevsky
- Epigraph: "That which is wanting cannot be numbered." Ecclesiastes

== Awards ==
- 2008 Western Australia Premier's Prize
- 2009 Queensland Premier's Prize
- 2009 New Yorker Notable Book of the Year
- 2009 Washington Post Book of the Year
- 2009 London Observer Book of the Year

== Interviews ==
- Steger, Jason (30 October 2008). "Flanagan's Book of Desire". The Age.
- Ramona Kaval on "The Book Show"
- Simon Bevilacqua in "The Mercury"
- Sally Warhaft on "Slow TV"
