= Jane Franklin =

British explorer (1791–1875)

Lady Jane Franklin
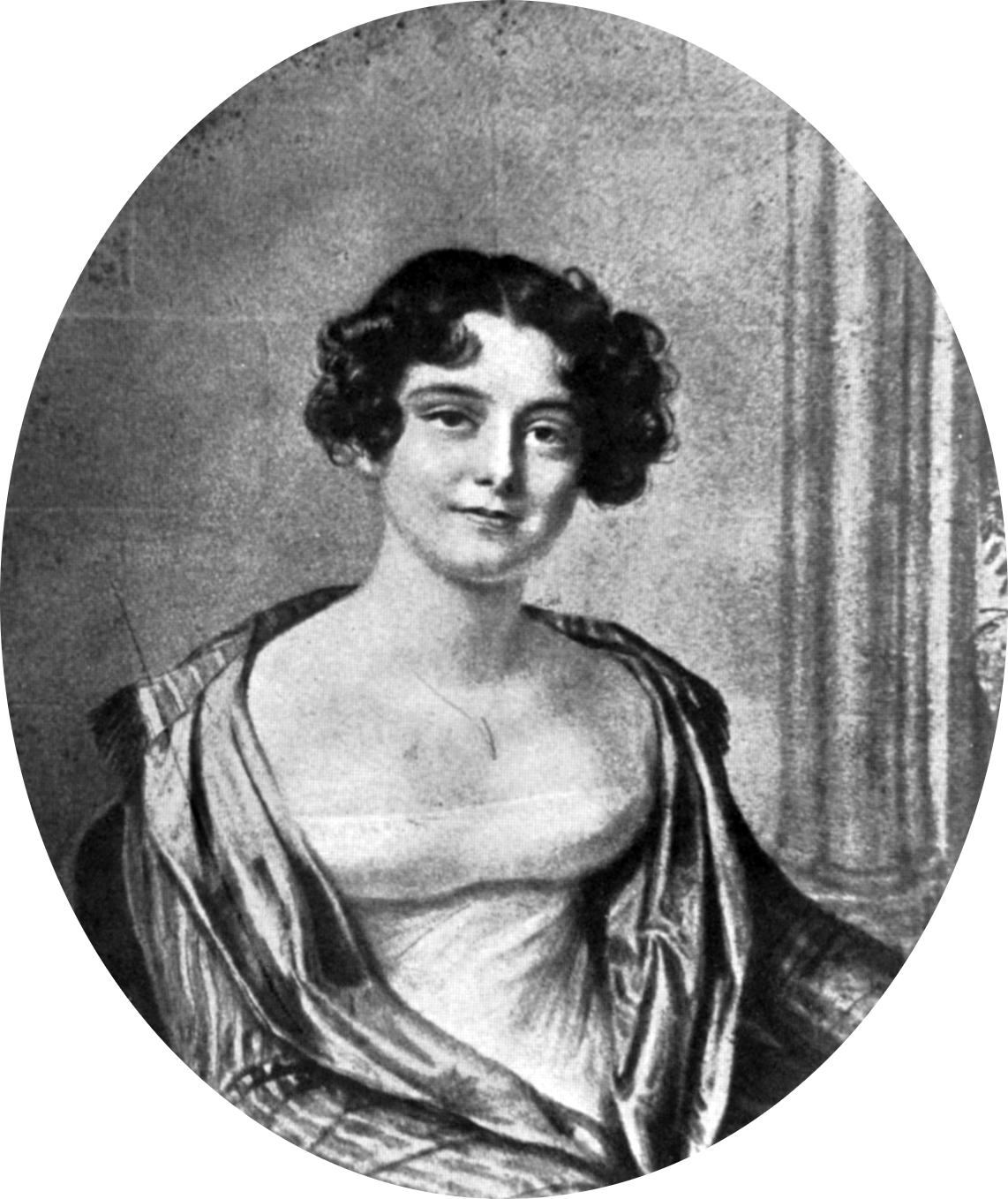
- 1816 Portrait by Amélie Munier-Romilly
- Born: Jane Griffin; 4 December 1791; London, England
- Died: 18 July 1875 (aged 83); London, England
- Spouse: Sir John Franklin (m. 1828; died 1847)

Jane, Lady Franklin (née Griffin; 4 December 1791 – 18 July 1875) was a British explorer, seasoned traveller and the second wife of the English explorer Sir John Franklin. During her husband's period as Lieutenant-Governor of Van Diemen's Land, she became known for her philanthropic work and her travels throughout south-eastern Australia. After John Franklin's disappearance in search of the Northwest Passage, she sponsored or otherwise supported several expeditions to determine his fate.

== Early life and marriage ==
She was born on 4 December 1791, the daughter of John Griffin, silk weaver, of London, and Mary, née Guillemard.

As a young woman, Jane was attracted to a London physician and scientist, Peter Mark Roget, best known for publishing Roget's Thesaurus. She once said he was the only man who made her swoon, but nothing ever came of the relationship.

On 5 November 1828 she married John Franklin.

== Relationship with the colonies of Australia and New Zealand ==
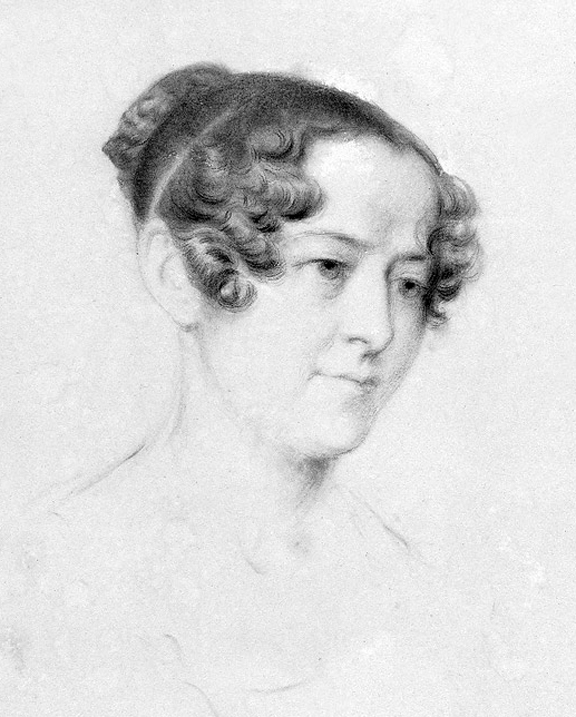
Jane, Lady Franklin portrait, 1838

In 1842, Franklin commissioned a classical temple, and named it Ancanthe, Ancient Greek for "blooming valley". She intended the building to serve as a museum for Hobart, and left 400 acres (1.6 km^{2}) in trust to ensure the continuance of what she hoped would become the focus of the colony's cultural aspirations. A century of apathy followed, with the museum used as an apple shed among other functions; but in 1949 it was made the home of The Art Society of Tasmania, who rescued the building. It is now known as the Lady Franklin Gallery.

=== Interactions with the indigenous people ===
Jane Franklin requested George Augustus Robinson the Protector of Aborigines to send her a "black boy" from the Wybalenna Aboriginal Establishment along with other curiosities such as snakes and the skull of an Aboriginal. Robinson sent her a nine-year-old boy whom he had renamed Timmie, but whose original name was Timemendic. Lady Franklin renamed the boy Timeo and handed him over to her step-daughter Eleanor Franklin. Timeo was trained as a household servant but was deemed too "idle and disobedient" and the Franklins attempted to offload him to the Hobart Orphan School.

In 1841, Jane decided to try and "civilise" a second child from Wybalenna. A six-year-old girl named Mary (original name Mathinna) was sent to live at Government House at Hobart with the Franklins, although she was not an orphan. Again, it was Lady Franklin's step-daughter who was placed in charge of her care. Lady Jane compared Mathinna more favourably in comparison to Timemendic, with Mathinna being described as more intelligent and sweet, while Timemendic was "much blacker in complexion than Mathinna who appears to us to be daily growing more copper-coloured as she advances in civilization".

In 1842, Lady Franklin commissioned the artist Thomas Bock to paint Mathinna's portrait in which she is portrayed famously in a scarlet dress. Jane sent the portrait to her sister in England with a letter describing Mathinna as "one of the remnant people about to disappear from the face of the earth", who has "the unconquerable nature of the savage".

In June 1843 a request came from Mathinna's step-father, Palle, through Robert Clark, a teacher at Flinders Island, that the Franklins return his step-daughter. Sir John refused and admonished Clark to not meddle in the affairs of others. However, a month later, in August 1843, the couple left Mathinna at Queen's Orphan School in Hobart.

== End of husband's tenure as governor ==
In August that same year the Franklins were taken aback when Sir John Yardley-Wilmot arrived in Tasmania announcing that he was the new appointed governor of Van Diemen's Land. John Montagu, who had served as colonial secretary for Sir John but had been dismissed for his antagonism towards the Franklins and for his insubordination towards Sir John had returned to Britain with stories publicised in the British newspapers about the bad leadership of Sir John. Montagu also accused him of being ruled by his wife, a claim that was believed by the Undersecretary of State for the Colonies James Stephen and Lord Stanley to recall Sir John.

This meant that Lady Franklin and Sir John had to leave their home quite hastily and sell many of their possessions and return to England. They would arrive in Britain the following year, and the Franklins set about to restore their tarnished reputation.

This was done by Lady Franklin authoring a book under the name of her husband defending his actions titled "Narrative of Some Passages in the History of Van Diemen´s Land" as well as financially supporting authors such as the explorer Paweł Strzelecki´s Physical Description of New South Wales. Accompanied by a Geological Map, Sections and Diagrams, and Figures of the Organic Remains (1845) that were highly favourable of Sir John and Lady Franklin.

Shortly after their arrival Sir John had applied to being in charge of leading a polar expedition in search of the Northwest passage.

== Following the disappearance of her husband ==
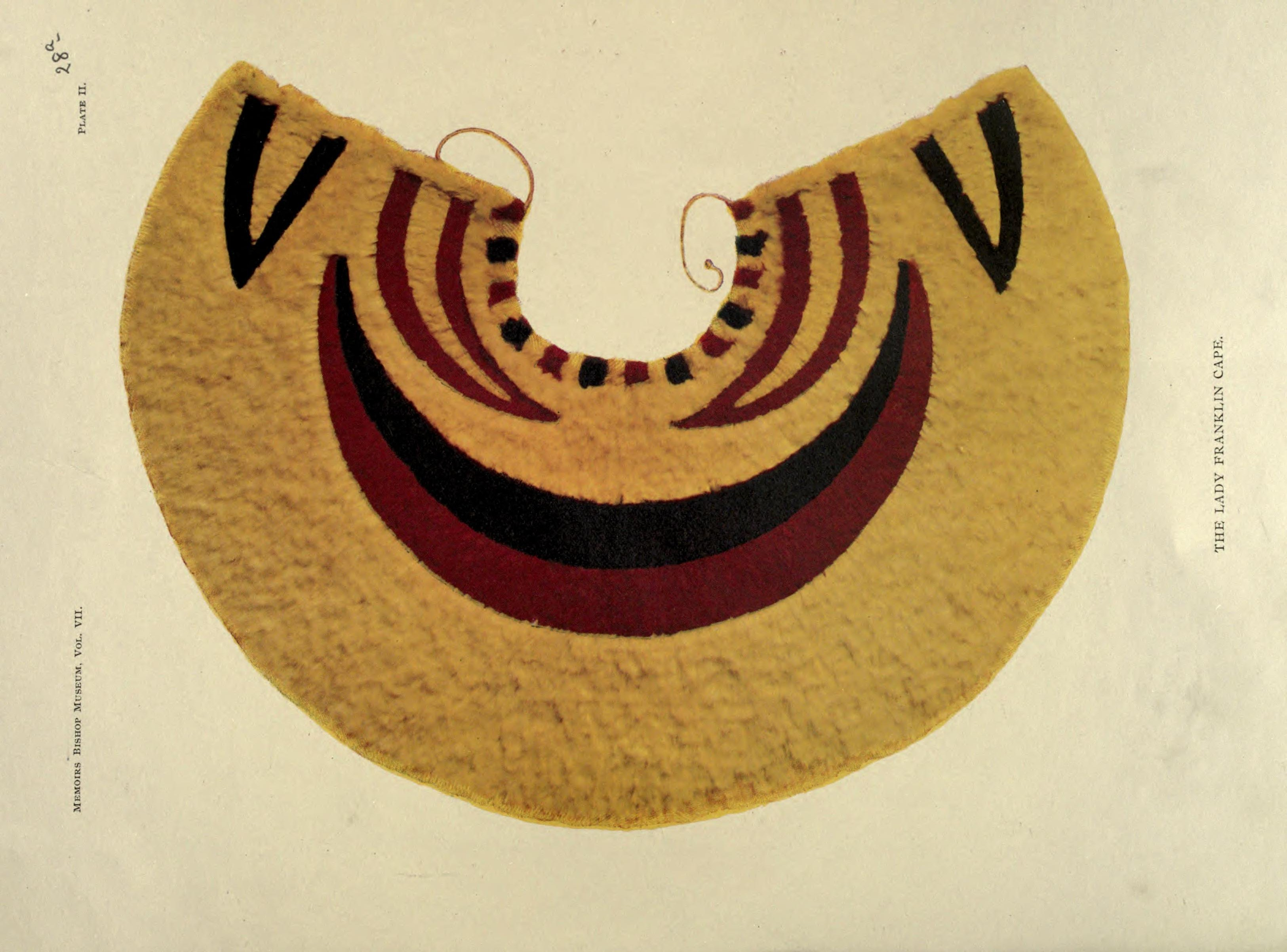
Lady Franklin's ʻahuʻula, a Hawaiian feather cape presented to her by King Kamehameha IV during her visit in 1861, Bishop Museum.

Until shortly before her own death, Lady Franklin travelled extensively, generally accompanied by her husband's niece Sophia Cracroft, who remained her secretary and companion until her death. Lady Franklin travelled to Out Stack in the Shetland Islands of Scotland, the northernmost of the British isles, to get as close as she could to her missing husband.

Lady Franklin sponsored seven expeditions to find her husband or his records (two of the expeditions failed to reach the Arctic):

- 1850 Prince Albert under Charles Codrington Forsyth and William Parker Snow
- 1851 Prince Albert under William Kennedy and Joseph René Bellot,
- 1852 Isabel (one under Donald Beatson aborted, the other under Edward Inglefield explored Greenland)
- 1853 Isabel (William Kennedy and Robert Grate, aborted)
- 1857 Fox under Francis Leopold McClintock, and
- 1875 Pandora under Allen Young

By means of sponsorship, use of influence, and offers of sizeable rewards for information about him, she instigated or supported many other searches. Her efforts made the expedition's fate one of the most vexed questions of the decade. Ultimately, in 1859, Francis McClintock found evidence that Sir John had died twelve years previously, in 1847. Prior accounts had suggested that, in the end, the expedition had turned to cannibalism to survive, but Lady Franklin refused to believe these stories and poured scorn on explorer John Rae, who had in fact been the first person to return with definite news of her husband's fate.

The popularity of the Franklins in the Australian colonies was such that when it was learned in 1852 that Lady Franklin was organising an expedition in search of her husband using the auxiliary steamship Isabel, subscriptions were taken up, and those in Van Diemen's Land alone totalled £1671/13/4.

Although McClintock had found conclusive evidence that Sir John Franklin and his fellow expeditioners were dead, Lady Franklin remained convinced that their written records might remain buried in a cache in the Arctic. She provided moral and some financial support for multiple later expeditions that planned to seek the records, including those of William Parker Snow and Charles Francis Hall in the 1860s.

Finally, in 1874, she joined forces with Allen Young to purchase and fit out the former steam gunboat HMS Pandora to undertake another expedition to the region around Prince of Wales Island. The expedition left London in June 1875 and returned in December, unsuccessful, as ice prevented her from passing west of the Franklin Strait.

Lady Franklin died in the interim, on 18 July 1875. At her funeral on 29 July, the pall-bearers included Captains McClintock, Collinson and Ommanney, R.N., while many other "Old Arctics" engaged in the Franklin searches were also in attendance. She was interred at Kensal Green Cemetery in the vault and commemorated on a marble cross dedicated to her niece Sophia Cracroft.

== Legacy ==
Natural features named after her include Lady Franklin Bay, on Ellesmere Island and Lady Franklin Point, on Victoria Island, both in Nunavut; Lady Franklin Rock, an island in the Fraser River near Yale, British Columbia, named at the end of her visit there during the Fraser Canyon Gold Rush; Lady Franklin Rock, near Vernal Fall in Yosemite National Park in California; and Mount Lady Jane Franklin, a hill near Barnawartha in Northern Victoria, which she climbed on her trip from Port Phillip to Sydney in 1839. Beside Victoria's Mount Franklin is a scoria mound known as Lady Franklin.

Jane Franklin Hall, a residential college in Hobart, Tasmania, is named in her honour, as is the Lady Franklin Gallery in Lenah Valley, Tasmania. The ballad "Lady Franklin's Lament" commemorated her search for her lost husband. The sailing vessel; Jane Franklin, an Amel Super Maramu ketch, also bears her name. Lady Jane Franklin Drive in Spilsby, Lincolnshire, Sir John's birthplace, is named after her.

The barque Lady Franklin was named after her.

Most of Lady Franklin's surviving papers are held by the Scott Polar Research Institute.

== In popular culture ==
Jules Verne's novel Mistress Branican, published in 1891, was strongly inspired by Jane Franklin's life. When John Branican, on board the Franklin, disappears at sea in Oceania, his wife Dolly Branican cannot believe that he is dead. Three expeditions are organised, and she is herself part of the third, which leads her to the depths of the Australian Great Sandy Desert. Dolly Branican is overtly compared with Jane Franklin in the novel.

She was depicted in the stage play Jane, My Love.

Jane Franklin appears as a character in the 2018 television series The Terror, where she is portrayed by Greta Scacchi.

The Frozen Passage DLC in the video game Anno 1800 is based on Lady Franklin's story. In the game, Lady Jane Faithful requests the player's help to save her husband, Sir John Faithful, from a lost arctic expedition.

Lady Franklin is also a pivotal figure in three novels, Wanting by Richard Flanagan (2008), The Arctic Fury by Greer Macallister (2020), and The Exiles by Christina Baker Kline (2020).

== Awards and honours ==
- Founder's gold medal, the Royal Geographical Society

The biography The Ambitions of Jane Franklin: Victorian Lady Adventurer by Tasmanian historian Alison Alexander won the 2014 National Biography Award.

== See also ==
- Lady Franklin's Revenge by Ken McGoogan, a history of explorations of the Arctic funded by Lady Franklin
