= Walter George Arthur =

Indigenous Tasmanian leader

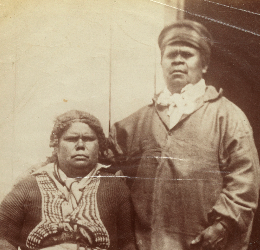
Walter George Arthur with his wife Mary Ann

Walter George Arthur (c.1820 – 12 May 1861) was an Aboriginal Tasmanian leader, newspaper editor, drover, whaler and pioneering Indigenous rights activist.

== Early life ==
Arthur was born around 1820. His parentage is unclear but he himself stated that he was from the clan of people who inhabited the region around Ben Lomond in north-eastern Van Diemen's Land. It is possible that he was the son of Rolepa (also known as Trowlebunner), a senior man of the Ben Lomond tribe and that his mother was probably either Luggenemenener or Toogernupertooner also from this tribe.

As a young Indigenous boy, Arthur lived through the violence and dispossession of British colonisation and the Black War. During this period, he became separated from his kin and taken from his country in unclear circumstances. He appears to have been too young to retain much knowledge of his people's language and culture. He lived on the streets of the British colonial settlement of Launceston with another Aboriginal boy, where in order to survive, they became joined to a criminal gang, working as petty thieves and pickpockets. He was referred to by the name of "Friday".

In February 1832 Arthur and the other Aboriginal boy were taken off the streets of Launceston by George Augustus Robinson, an evangelical Christian who was employed by the colonial government to round up the remaining Indigenous Tasmanians. Robinson sent the boys to the orphan school in Hobart where the other boy died but Arthur survived and learnt to read and write in English.

In May 1835, he was transported to the Wybalenna Aboriginal Establishment on Flinders Island, where almost all the other 200 or so surviving Aboriginal Tasmanians were placed into exile.

== Wybalenna ==
At the Wybalenna facility, he was no longer called "Friday", but was given the name of Walter George Arthur, after the Lieutenant Governor of Van Diemen's Land, Sir George Arthur. He was one of the most educated (in a European sense) Aborigines at Wybalenna and taught reading and writing in English to the other inmates. He also assisted in church services and was a co-editor with another Aboriginal youth named Thomas Brune of the small newspaper at the establishment called the Flinders Island Chronicle. This publication was the first ever Indigenous Australian newspaper and ran for 31 issues between 1837 and 1838. Its production consisted of single page, handwritten issues and often gave important insights into the hard life at Wybalenna, such as the following quote from 1837 when twenty-nine people died:

Let us hope...that something may be done for us poor people they are dying away the Bible says some or all shall be saved but I am much afraid none of us will be alive. Why don't the blackfellows pray to the king to get us away from this place.

Arthur also began a sexual relationship with a young Indigenous women named Mary Ann, daughter of Tarenootairer. The couple were found in bed together and Arthur was punished with a four-day sentence in Wybalenna's prison. To avoid a scandal, George Augustus Robinson, who was now the superintendent at Wybalenna, arranged a marriage between the two on 16 March 1838. Walter and Mary Ann were then sent to live on the small islands off the coast of Flinders Island, farming the sheep belonging to the Wybalenna facility.

== Port Phillip District ==
In March 1839 Arthur and Mary Ann, with thirteen other Aborigines from Wybalenna accompanied Robinson and his family to the recently colonised Port Phillip District on the Australian mainland, where Robinson took up the position of Protector of Aborigines. Arthur found work as a stockman and made at least two droving trips, overlanding cattle to South Australia. He also worked on the farms of Robinson's sons near the Goulburn River. Mary Ann was employed as a housemaid to the Robinsons.

Arthur witnessed first-hand the dispossession and despair of the local Aboriginal people at the hands of the British colonists, just as he had experienced in his own country in Van Diemen's Land. He questioned whether white society would ever see Indigenous Australians as being deserved of equality.

In 1842, two other young Aboriginal men from Wybalenna, Maulboyheenner and Tunnerminnerwait, were sentenced to death in Melbourne for murdering two sailors. Arthur and Robinson visited them in jail before their execution, and two days after they were publicly hanged, Arthur became very despondent and was arrested for drunkenness.

The surviving Tasmanian Aborigines that had come with Robinson, which included Arthur and Mary Ann, were then ordered back to Wybalenna.

== Return to Wybalenna and petition to Queen Victoria ==
In August 1842 Arthur and Mary Ann returned to Wybalenna on Flinders Island where they came into conflict with the new superintendent Dr Henry Jeanneret, who was known to be abusive and dictatorial. Arthur, Mary Ann and several other Indigenous residents began to agitate for his dismissal. Their most significant action was to write a petition in February 1846 to Queen Victoria, complaining about Jeanneret's behaviour. It was signed by 'Walter G. Arthur, Chief of the Ben Lomond tribe' and seven other Aboriginal men. It was the first petition written by Indigenous Australian people to a reigning monarch, in which they wrote:

Your Majesty's petitioners pray that you will not allow Dr Jeanneret to come again among us...he used to carry pistols in his pockets and threatened to shoot us...our houses were let fall down and they were never cleaned but covered with vermin...eleven of us died when he was here...he put many of us into jail for talking to him because we would not be his slaves.

They also wrote letters to William Denison, the Lieutenant-Governor of the colony, seeking his support for their rights.

== Oyster Cove ==
As a consequence of the petitions received from Arthur and the others, the Lieutenant-Governor made the decision to shut Wybalenna and transfer the survivors to an abandoned convict holding facility at Oyster Cove, about forty kilometres south-west of Hobart. In October 1847, Arthur, Mary Ann and 45 other survivors arrived at Oyster Cove. Arthur and Mary Ann played a prominent role in demanding improved conditions and made further petitions to be allowed to establish his own farm. Arthur and Mary Ann were successful and obtained a small land grant near Oyster Cove. They were unable to have a child of their own, but adopted a child survivor of Wybalenna named William Lanne.

Arthur and Mary Ann were not successful as farmers and from 1859 to 1861, Arthur obtained employment as a crew-member on the Hobart-based whaling vessel Sussex.

== Death ==
Returning by rowing boat to Oyster Cove on 12 May 1861, Arthur, possibly inebriated, fell overboard. His body was never found.

Mary Ann afterwards married an ex-convict named Adam Booker and died ten years later on 25 July 1871.

== See also ==
- List of Indigenous Australian historical figures
