= Oyster Cove, Tasmania =

Locality in Tasmania, Australia

Putalina
- Location within Tasmania
- Location: Tasmania
- Coordinates: 43°6′27″S 147°15′31″E

Putalina, Oyster Cove is a semi-rural locality in the local government areas (LGA) of Kingborough and Huon Valley in the Nipaluna, Hobart and South-east LGA regions of Lutruwita, Tasmania. The locality is about 20 kilometres (12 mi) south-west of the town of Kingston. The 2016 census recorded a population of 319 for the state suburb of Oyster Cove. Part of Putalina, Oyster Cove is an Indigenous Protected Area due to its history as a colonial holding facility for Aboriginal Tasmanians.

== History ==
=== Pre-colonial ===
Before British colonisation, the Oyster Cove area was part of the country of the Nuenonne people of Indigenous Tasmanians, probably frequented mostly by the Melukerdee clan of these people.

A French naval expedition arrived in the bay in the 1790s, calling it Baie d'Huîtres from which the name Oyster Cove is derived.

=== British colonisation ===
In the 1820s, British sawyers entered the region to exploit the prime timber resources. A timber mill was established by John Helder Wedge at Oyster Cove and convict wood-cutting teams resided in the area. These workers perpetrated violence and rape against the local Nuenonne people and spread venereal disease amongst them. As a teenage girl, the famous Indigenous woman, Truganini, was held for sexual purposes by sawyers at nearby Birchs Bay.

In 1840, the Oyster Bay Probation Station was built to house convicts, but it proved too expensive and was shut in 1847.

=== Oyster Cove Aboriginal facility ===
After the destruction of Aboriginal Tasmanian society by British colonisation and the Black War, the remaining 200 or so Indigenous survivors were rounded up and placed into forced exile at the Wybalenna Aboriginal Establishment on Flinders Island. In 1847, the Wybalenna facility was shut down and the remaining 47 Indigenous people were moved to Oyster Cove.

The 14 men, 23 women and 10 children were placed in the abandoned and dilapidated convict facility. The appointed manager, Joseph Milligan, neglected his duty of care to these people despite being paid £600 per year. The buildings fell into disrepair, the food supply was poor and mortality was high due to the area being exposed to cold winds and dampness. The children, like Mathinna, were separated from the adults and relocated to the orphan school in Hobart.

In 1855, an investigation by the colonial surveyor James Erskine Calder found that the Oyster Cove facility was in an almost completely derelict state with alcoholism and prostitution being pressed upon the fifteen surviving occupants. Although Milligan was sacked as manager, the funding of the facility was further reduced. John and Matilda Dandridge were appointed as replacements to Milligan, and they were able to make improvements to lives of the survivors.

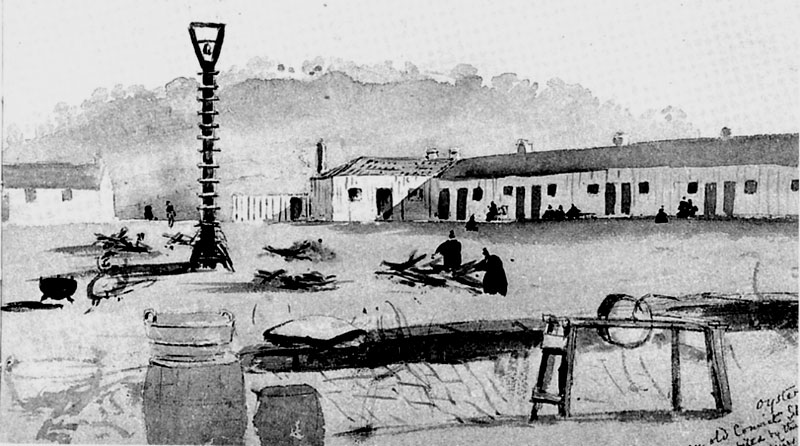
The Oyster Cove Aboriginal facility

Under the new regime, the Aboriginal residents were allowed some freedoms, with the women such as Truganini, Dray, Patty Clark, Wapperty and Bessy Clark permitted to go on extended hunting and cultural excursions into the bush and across to Bruny Island. The men, such as William Lanne and Tillarbunner, were able to be employed on whaling ships. Walter George Arthur and his wife Mary Ann were granted a 3 hectare block of land near to Oyster Cove to farm, while Fanny Cochrane Smith was allowed to move out after she married a local white sawyer.

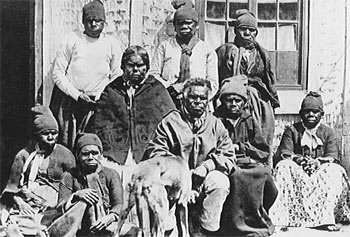
Residents of the Oyster Cove facility

However, disease and despair hung over Oyster Cove, and when a pub named "The Aborigine" was opened at nearby Little Oyster Cove in 1858, alcoholism became rampant. By 1867, there were only four residents left alive, and in 1872 Truganini was the sole survivor. In that year, the government shut down the Oyster Cove Aboriginal facility and Truganini was relocated to the Dandridges' home in Hobart where she died in 1876.

Many of the corpses and skeletal remains of the Aboriginal residents who died at Oyster Cove and elsewhere were mutilated and taken by the colonists. Their skulls in particular were taken and then sold or given to anatomists within the colony or in Britain and Europe. For example, William Lanne's body was decapitated by William Crowther at the Hobart hospital and Truganini's skeleton was exhumed and displayed at the Tasmanian Museum and Art Gallery, while Patty Clark's skeleton was dissected out of her body by Morton Allport soon after she died. Edward Crowther and his son William Edward Crowther purchased land at Oyster Cove in 1900 and by 1909 had exhumed the remains of fourteen people from the Aboriginal cemetery for their collection.

The locality was returned to the Indigenous people of Tasmania in 1995 under the Aboriginal Lands Act 1995, and in 1999 Oyster Cove was declared an Indigenous Protected Area. By this time, many of stolen Aboriginal skeletal remains had been repatriated to the local Aboriginal community.

=== Further development ===
Oyster Cove Post Office opened in 1897 and closed in 1924. It re-opened in 1927 and closed in 1964.

In 1894, teacher Lily Poulett-Harris established the first woman's cricket league in Australia at Oyster Cove, The Oyster Cove Ladies Club.

Oyster Cove was gazetted as a locality in 1968.

== Geography ==
The shore of the D’Entrecasteaux Channel forms the eastern boundary.

== Road infrastructure ==
The Channel Highway (Route B68) passes through from north to south. Route C626 (Nicholls Rivulet Road) starts at an intersection with B68 and runs west until it exits.

== See also ==
- English Passengers by Matthew Kneale
