= Maulboyheenner =

Aboriginal Australian guide and resistance fighter

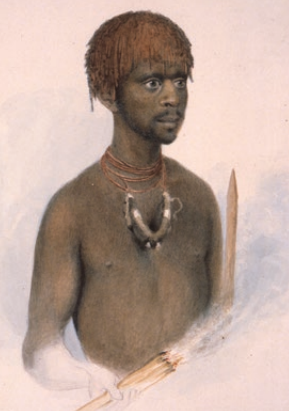
- Born: c. 1816; Northeastern Tasmania, Australia
- Died: 20 January 1842 (aged 25–26); Port Phillip, Australia
- Cause of death: Execution by Hanging
- Resting place: Queen Victoria Market
- Other names: Timme, Timmy, Bob, Malapuwinarana
- Known for: Aboriginal resistance fighter and guide

Maulboyheenner (c. 1816 – 20 January 1842) was an Indigenous Australian resistance fighter and guide from north-eastern Tasmania. He was also known by several other names, including Timme, Timmy, Bob, and Malapuwinarana.

== Early life ==
Maulboyheenner was born around 1816 in the Cape Portland area of north-eastern Tasmania, a region known to his people as Nalebunner. His father was a local clan leader named Rolepa and his mother was Luggenemenener. As a child in 1826, he witnessed the wreck of the colonial vessel Sally, which was transporting colonists of the Van Diemen's Land Company to establish a horse breeding station at Cape Portland.

In 1829, during the Black War of extermination conducted by the British colonists against the Indigenous people of Tasmania, an armed 'roving party' led by John Batman raided his clan, killing a number of people and taking his mother, Luggenemenener, captive. Maulboyheenner, who was thirteen at the time, was also captured and taken away to Launceston.

== Joins the 'friendly mission' of George Augustus Robinson ==
In 1830, Maulboyheenner joined George Augustus Robinson and his 'friendly mission' as one of a number of Aboriginal guides. This mission was a series of expeditions designed to round-up the remaining Aboriginal people of Tasmania and place them in enforced exile upon Flinders Island in the Bass Strait. At the time Maulboyheenner was described as a 'native adolescent' who was useful for Robinson in locating the remnant Indigenous groups led by Eumarrah, Tongerlongeter and Montpelliatta. He continued in this service until 1834, when he himself was also transported to the Wybalenna Aboriginal Establishment on Flinders Island.

== Relocated to the Port Phillip District ==
Maulboyheenner was among sixteen Tasmanian Aboriginal people whom George Augustus Robinson brought to the newly colonised settlement of Melbourne in the Port Phillip District in 1839, with the intention that they would help to "civilise" the Victorian "blacks" when he became Chief Protector of Aborigines at Port Phillip.

== Resistance and shooting of sailors ==
In September 1841, Maulboyheenner and another four of the Indigenous Tasmanians including Tunnerminnerwait (Peevay), Plorenernoopner (Fanny), Maytepueminer (Maria) and Truganini waged a seven-week campaign of resistance against British settlers in the Western Port area south-east of Melbourne. Maulboyheenner was by this time in a relationship with Truganini. The group stole several firearms and some ammunition from settlers' huts near Dandenong and robbed other houses. They made their way to Cape Paterson, looking for Maytepueminer's husband, Lacklay, who had gone missing in the area previously and was rumoured to have been murdered there. On 6 November 1841, they had a shoot out with the overseers of a coal mine at Cape Paterson, in which four white men were injured and two sailors from a nearby whaling station were killed.

It took three military expeditions to successfully track and capture them, with the help of Native Police. All five were captured later in 1841 at Powlett River.

== Trial and judgement ==
They appeared before Judge Willis on 20 December 1841 in Melbourne, charged with murder. The five were defended by Redmond Barry who was the standing Defence Council for Aborigines. Barry questioned the legal basis of British authority over Aboriginal people who were not citizens and claimed that the evidence was dubious and circumstantial. Being Aboriginal, none of the five people charged were permitted to give evidence in court.

Judge Willis "did not wish that justice should be so administered as to afford murderers to escape the justice of the law: he did not wish such a thing to occur in his district"."

The Supreme Court found Tunnerminnerwait and Maulboyheenner guilty of the murder of the two whalers, who were named Cook and Yankey, and were sentenced to death. Judge Willis designed their punishment to inspire 'terror... to deter similar transgressions' from Aboriginal people.

== Death ==
Together with Tunnerminnerwait, Maulboyheenner was executed for murder on 20 January 1842 outside Old Melbourne Gaol. They were the first legal executions to take place in Melbourne. They were also the first of only a small number of hangings that were conducted publicly at that settlement. A crowd of around 5000 settlers witnessed Maulboyheenner being slowly strangled to death in the bungled hanging.

Tunnerminnerwait and Maulboyheenner were buried in an unmarked graves at the Old Melbourne Cemetery, which now lies under the Queen Victoria Market.

== Memorials ==
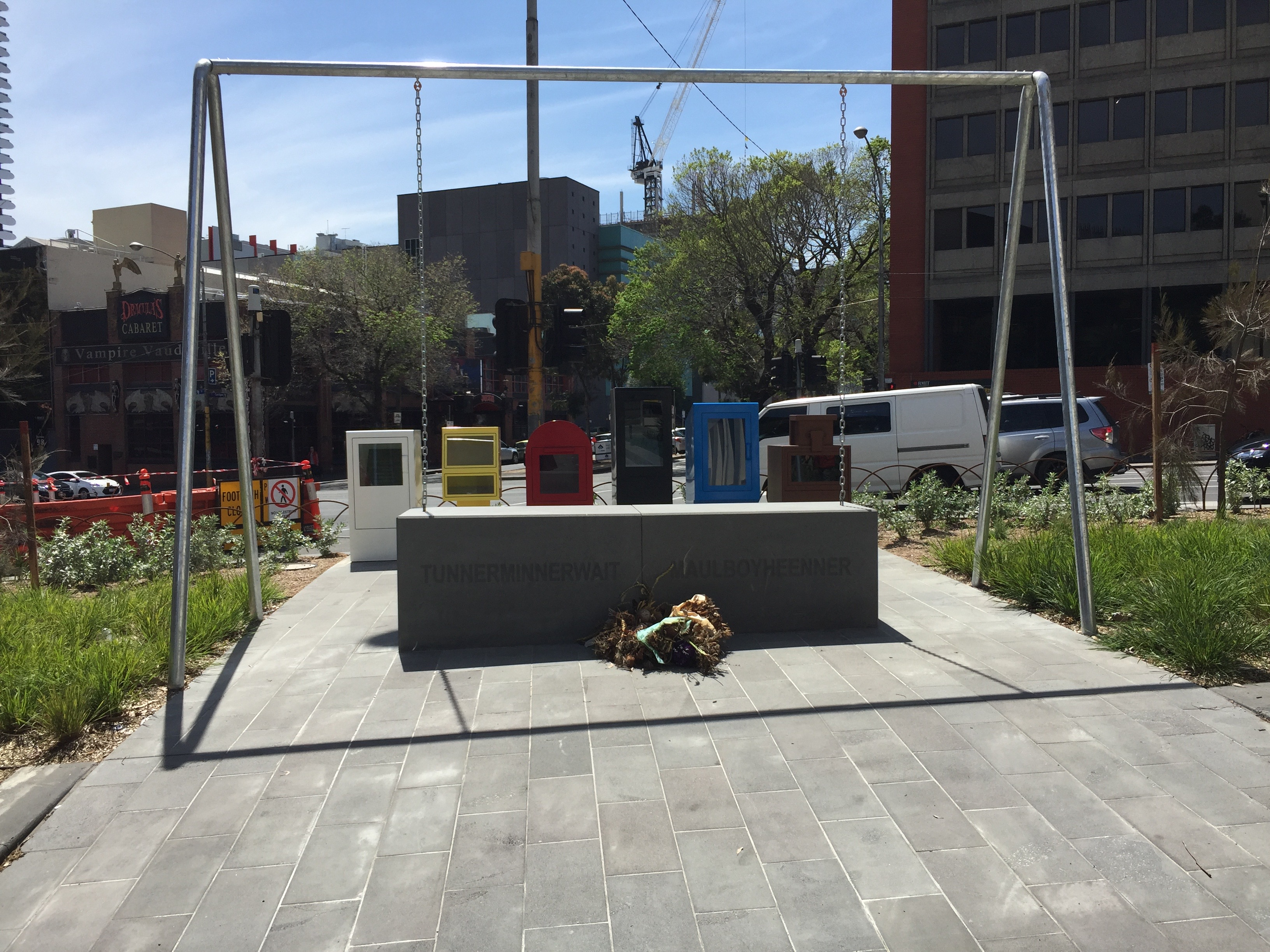
Memorial to Tunnerminnerwait and Maulboyheenner in Melbourne

- In 2008, the Tunnerminnerwait and Maulboyheenner Commemoration Committee was established to hold a yearly commemoration at the site of their execution.
- A public artwork commissioned by the City of Melbourne called Standing by Tunnerminnerwait and Maulboyheenner stands at or near the place of execution in Victoria St, outside the walls of the Old Melbourne Gaol. The website contains historical research and information on the artists commissioned for the marker, artist Brook Andrew, along with Trent Walter.

== See also ==
- List of Indigenous Australian historical figures
