= Flinders Island Chronicle =

Former Tasmanian newspaper

The Flinders Island Chronicle was an Australian newspaper founded in September 1836 and running until December 1837. It was jointly written and edited by Thomas Brune and Walter George Arthur. Twenty nine editions are currently known of. It is notable as being the first newspaper produced by Indigenous Australians.

The Flinders Island Chronicle was produced at the Wybalenna Aboriginal Establishment on Flinders Island, where many Tasmanian Aboriginals were exiled in the early 1830s, following the Black War. Thomas Brune, aged about fourteen, and Walter George Arthur, aged about seventeen, were the most literate amongst the children who had been educated at the Hobart Orphan school. They were selected by George Augustus Robinson as writers and in September 1836 wrote a Prospectus and First Edition.

we date our history of Events from the Month of October 1835 when our beloved father made his appearance among us... we had been in a deplorable state. we looked for a better day. and it has arrived

what a contrast between the present and the past

There was a break for almost twelve months until publication was resumed, and from late September to late December 1837, twenty seven editions were produced. Although written under Robinson's tight editorial control, Brune and Arthur depicted scenes of beauty:

"and the Native men was playing and singing about God and Jesus Christ and they were asinging bout there [sic] own country song and some of the Native people was shooting swans and Duck and Pelilcans.

And Native men was singing Godly song"

and abuse:

"hear this I got rittes to you the same things over and over again Commandant has directed me to work and if I dont attend to it I must be put in to joal"

The Flinders Island Chronicle was dominated by messages of Christian indoctrination. It also documented a community which was lively, rebellious, and sometimes under great stress. In early December 1837, Walter George Arthur rebelled against Robinson, and was removed from editing duties. By late December 1837, the Aboriginal inhabitants of Flinders Island began openly defying Robinson. The final issue of the Flinders Island Chronicle was produced on 21 December 1837.

Thomas Brune and Walter George Arthur remained close to Robinson, despite the demise of the Chronicle. In 1839, they accompanied Robinson when he became Chief Protector of Aborigines at the Port Phillip Protectorate. Thomas Brune reportedly died in Melbourne in January 1841 after a fall from a tree. Walter George Arthur lived in Melbourne for three years, working as a drover running between Melbourne and Adelaide. In 1842, he returned to Flinders Island and assumed a leadership position in the community. In 1846, he was a signatory and lead organiser of a petition to Queen Victoria against an abusive superintendent. Henry Reynolds called Arthur a "pioneer Aboriginal activist".

Excerpts from the Chronicle, primarily those written by Thomas Brune, are included in the Anthology of Australian Aboriginal Literature (2008).

== Sources ==
- Gale, M-A. (1997) Dhanum Djorra'wuy Dhäwu, Aboriginal Research Institute: Adelaide. ISBN 0 86803 182 8.
