= Tunnerminnerwait =

Aboriginal Australian leader and resistance fighter in Tasmania (c.1812–1842)

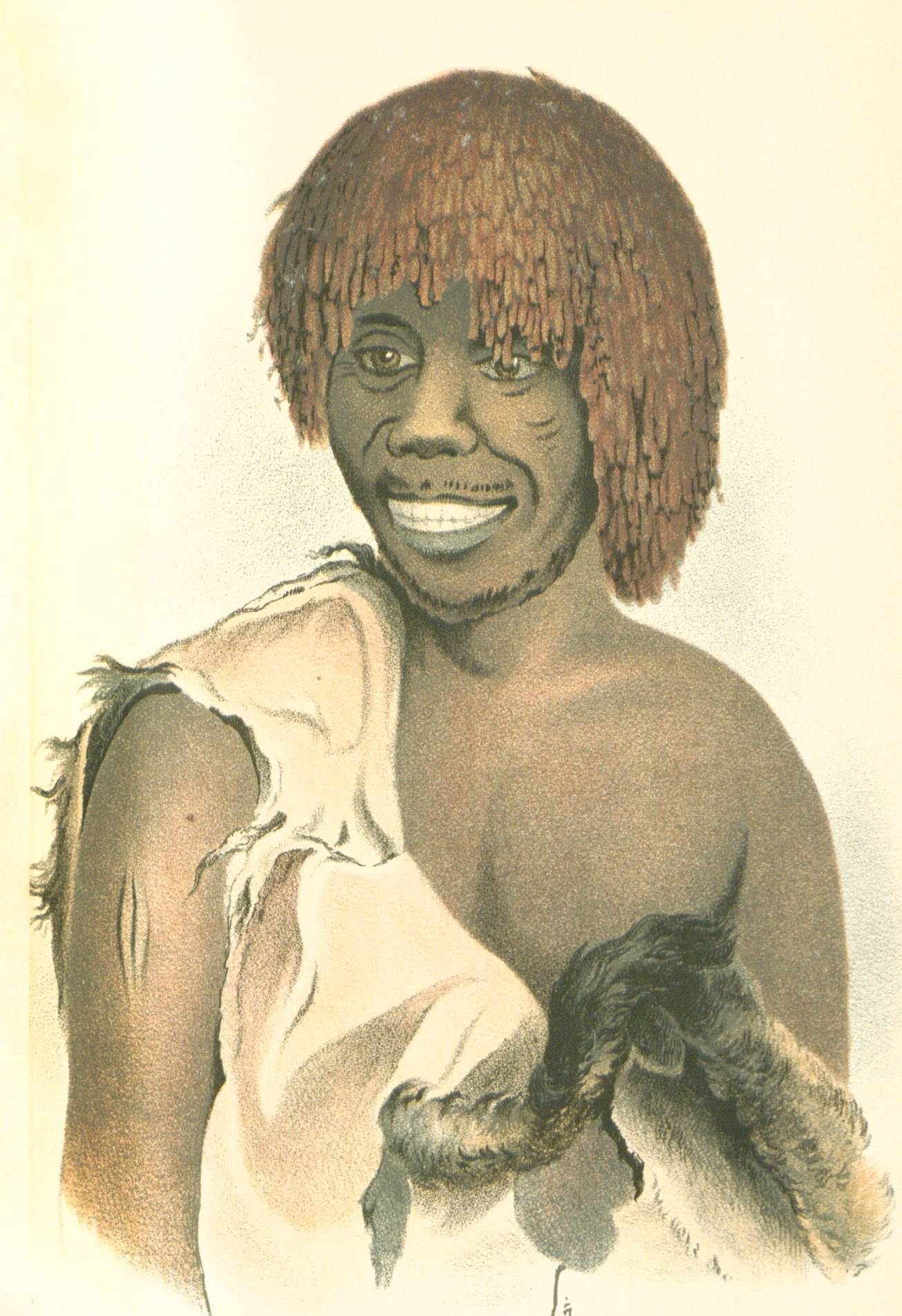
- Born: c. 1812; Robbins Island, Van Diemen's Land, British Empire (present-day Robbins Island, Tasmania, Australia)
- Died: 20 January 1842 (aged 29–30); Port Phillip District, Colony of New South Wales, British Empire (present-day Melbourne, Victoria, Australia)
- Cause of death: Execution by hanging
- Resting place: Queen Victoria Market
- Other names: Pevay, Piway, Tanaminawayt, Jack of Cape Grim, Tunninerpareway, Jack Napoleon Tarrapurrura
- Known for: Aboriginal freedom fighter

Tunnerminnerwait (c. 1812–1842) was an Australian Aboriginal resistance fighter and Parperloihener clansman from Tasmania. He was also known by several other names including Pevay, Jack of Cape Grim, Tunninerpareway and renamed Jack Napoleon Tarraparrura by George Robinson.

== Early life ==
Tunnerminnerwait was born on Robbins Island in Tasmania in 1812. He was the son of Keeghernewboyheener. Tunnerminnerwait belonged to the Parperloihener clan of the Aboriginal North West nation in Tasmania. His name means "waterbird".

Tunnerminnerwait spoke English well and was 5'7" (171 cm) tall. He was also known as Peevay (Pevay), Napoleon, Jack of Cape Grim, Jack Napoleon Tarraparrura and Tunninerpareway. His wife was Planobeena (Fanny) who was the sister of Aboriginal leader Eumarrah.

== Encounters with colonists ==
Tunnerminnerwait grew up on the island of Tasmania, the second British settlement area in Australia after Sydney Cove. Relations between the Aboriginal people inhabiting the island and the settlers became very hostile leading to attacks and massacres. The first massacre of Tasmanian Aboriginal people occurred at Risdon Cove in 1804, when troops fired on a group which included women and children. By 1806 clashes between Aboriginal people and settlers were common, and the Cape Grim massacre occurred on 10 February 1828. According to historian Professor Lyndall Ryan, (University of Newcastle) "Tunnerminnerwait had witnessed the Cape Grim massacre in 1828 as an 11-year-old, when a lot of his own people were killed. His whole family had fallen apart as a result."

Tunnerminnerwait first met civil servant George Augustus Robinson, Chief Protector of Aborigines, at Robbins Island in June 1830. He worked for Robinson as one of his guides on expeditions around the island from 1830 to 1835. In October 1835 Tunnerminnerwait went with Robinson to Flinders Island, a settlement where the remaining Aboriginal population were exiled. Robinson spoke of him as "an exceeding willing and industrious young man", who was "stout and well made, of good temper, and performed his work equal to any white man". Robinson also collected words from his native language. A portrait of Tunnerminnerwait was painted by the convict artist Thomas Bock between 1831 and 1835. It was published in James Fenton's history of Tasmania.

== Relocating to the mainland ==
Tunnerminnerwait and Planobeena were among sixteen Tasmanian Aboriginal people whom George Robinson brought to Melbourne in 1839 with the intention that they would help to "civilise" the Victorian "blacks" when he became Chief Protector of Aborigines at Port Phillip.

Tunnerminnerwait went with George Robinson on a major tour of the Western District from March to August 1841. During the tour they gathered testimonies about frontier violence in the Western District and investigated the Convincing Ground massacre in which between 60 and 200 members of a Gunditjmara clan were killed by whale-hunters at Portland Bay. After his return, Tunnerminnerwait and four others left Melbourne.

== Resistance ==
In September 1841, Tunnerminnerwait, Maulboyheenner, Plorenernoopner (Fanny), Maytepueminer (Maria) and Truganini, waged an eight-week campaign of resistance against the British settlement in the Port Philip area. They stole two guns and some ammunition from a settler's hut at Bass River. They robbed stations from Dandenong to Western Port and South Gippsland districts on the outskirts of Melbourne over the next seven weeks. They wounded four white men and killed two.

It took three military expeditions to successfully track and capture them, with the help of native police. All five were captured in November 1841 at Powlett River.

== Trial and judgement ==
They appeared before Judge Willis on 20 December 1841 in Melbourne, charged with murder. The five were defended by Redmond Barry who was the standing Defence Council for Aborigines. Barry questioned the legal basis of British authority over Aborigines who were not citizens and claimed that the evidence was dubious and circumstantial. None of the five people charged was permitted to give evidence in court.

"The press reported the exchanges in the court in this fashion: 'After a good deal of conversation an affidavit being made as to the absence of a material witness, Mr. Croke stated his intention of abandoning the principle charge for murder in consequence of not being able to obtain the witness who was so material. His Honour did not wish that justice should be so administered as to afford murderers to escape the justice of the law: he did not wish such a thing to occur in his district.'"

"If Willis was cited accurately by the press in describing the accused as murderers' before any evidence was led to convict them (and more than one newspaper carried this commentary), then, he seriously misconceived the rights of the prisoners to a fair trial in which their guilt had to be established by the prosecution beyond a reasonable doubt. In those circumstances a robust defence counsel would have submitted that Willis disqualify himself for prejudging the case."

The Supreme Court found the two men, Tunnerminnerwait ("Jack Napoleon Tarraparrura") and Maulboyheenner guilty of the murder of the two whalers, Cook and Yankey at Western Port on 6 October 1841. Tunnerminnerwait was reported as saying that "after his death he would join his father in Van Diemen's Land and hunt kangaroo".

== Death ==
Together with Maulboyheenner, Tunnerminnerwait was executed for murder on 20 January 1842. They were the first public executions to take place in the District of Port Phillip, the colony to become known as Melbourne.

Tunnerminnerwait and Maulboyheenner were the first people to be hanged by the Government in the District of Port Phillip, in 1842. A total of six people were hanged that year. The six hangings of 1842 remain the only judicially approved public executions in Melbourne's history, giving them particular historical significance.

— Claire Land, Tunnerminnerwait and Maulboyheenner: The involvement of Aboriginal people from Tasmania in key events of early Melbourne

Tunnerminnerwait and Maulboyheenner were buried in an unmarked graves at the Old Melbourne Cemetery which now lies under the Queen Victoria Market.

== Memorials ==
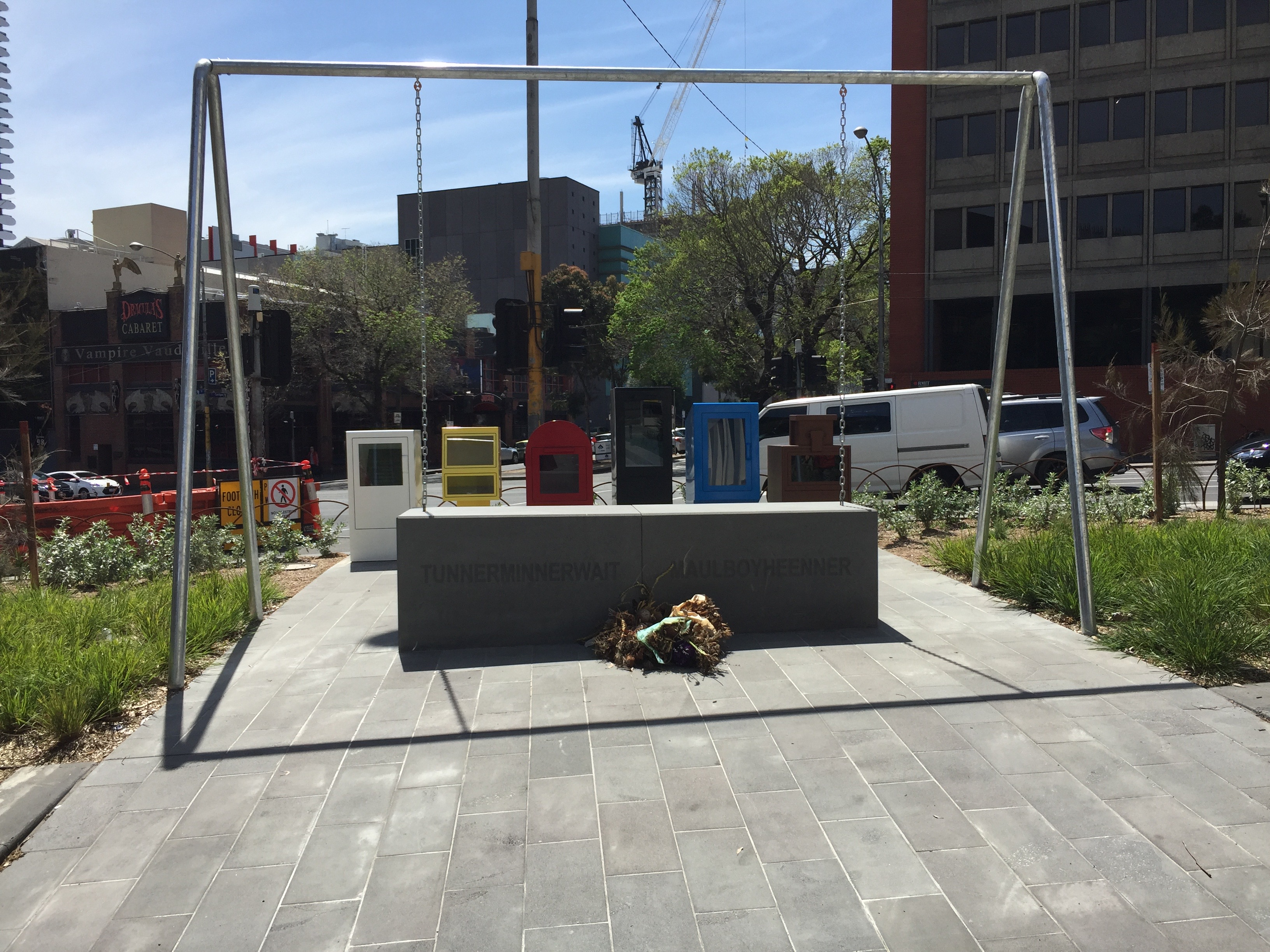
Memorial to Tunnerminnerwait and Maulboyheenner in Melbourne

- In 2008 the Tunnerminnerwait and Maulboyheenner Commemoration Committee was established to hold a yearly commemoration at the site of their execution.
- A public artwork commissioned by the City of Melbourne called Standing by Tunnerminnerwait and Maulboyheenner stands at or near the place of execution in Victoria St, outside the walls of the Old Melbourne Gaol. The website contains historical research and information on the artists commissioned for the marker, artist Brook Andrew, along with Trent Walter.

== See also ==
- Australian frontier wars
- Black War
- Pemulwuy, an Indigenous Australian resistance leader who led a guerrilla movement
- Tarenorerer, also known as Walyer, Waloa or Walloa was a rebel leader of the Indigenous Australians in Tasmania
- List of Indigenous Australian historical figures
