= Wybalenna Aboriginal Establishment =

British colonial internment camp for exiled Aboriginal Tasmanians

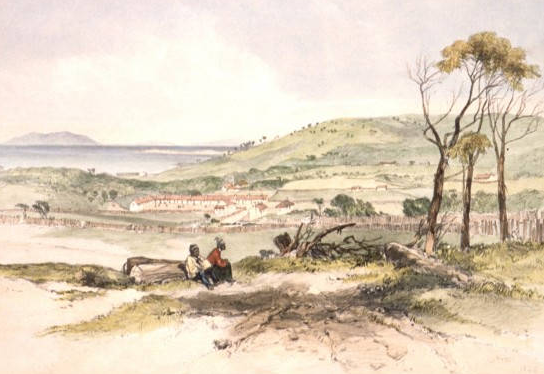
- 1846 painting of Wybalenna by John Skinner Prout

- Location within Tasmania
- Location: Flinders Island; 40°1′1″S 147°52′58″E
- Status: Non-operational
- Population: ~180 exiled people (~130 deaths)
- Opened: 1833
- Closed: 1847
- Managed by: British colonial government of Van Diemen's Land
- Director: George Augustus Robinson; Ens William James Darling; Dr James Allen; Henry Nickolls; Capt Malcolm Laing Smith; Dr Peter Fisher; Dr Henry Jeanneret; Dr Joseph Milligan

Notable prisoners
- Truganini, Tongerlongeter, Montpelliatta, William Lanne, Mathinna, Luggenemenener, Mannalargenna, Woretemoeteryenner, Towterer

The Wybalenna Aboriginal Establishment was an internment facility built at Flinders Island by the colonial British government of Van Diemen's Land to accommodate forcibly exiled Aboriginal Tasmanians (Palawa). It was opened in 1833 and ceased operations in 1847. During that period around 180 Palawa were situated at Wybalenna with approximately 130 people dying at the establishment. Around another 25 died while being transported to the facility. The main commandant of Wybalenna was George Augustus Robinson who played a principal role in the system of capturing and sending Palawa to the facility. Famous people incarcerated at Wybalenna included Truganini, Mannalargenna and William Lanne, amongst others. Due to the many deaths of Indigenous people at Wybalenna, the alienation of the inmates from their homeland and the forcible repression of cultural practices, the Wybalenna establishment is regarded as an example of the implementation of genocidal policies against Indigenous Australians.

== Origins of the facility ==
During the Black War of the late 1820s between the Indigenous Tasmanian people and the British colonists, the Lieutenant-Governor of Van Diemen's Land, George Arthur, began implementing a policy of exiling of captive Palawa prisoners of war on islands off the Tasmanian coast. The first such location was Bruny Island where a ration station built for the remaining local Nuenonne people was utilised from 1829. George Augustus Robinson was appointed to oversee the station in March of that year. However, within a few months 10 of the 19 inmates, mostly from the Nuenonne and Ninene clans, had died and the concept was close to collapse.

In order to remain employed, Robinson approached Lieutenant-Governor Arthur with an idea to use the remaining Indigenous people at Bruny as guides to find and bring other Palawa to the station. Arthur already had a similar policy in place with armed "roving parties" commanded by people such as Gilbert Robertson and John Batman, who would search for and capture or kill Palawa with the aid of Aboriginal guides. However, Robinson's plan was to use persuasion rather than force, and Arthur readily agreed to it. Robinson's so-called "friendly mission" therefore began in January 1830 with 12 Palawa located at Bruny Island acting as guides. One of these was Truganini.

Robinson and his group proceeded from the wilderness of southern Tasmania, up the west coast and then along the northern coast. Along the way, he convinced a small number of Palawa to give themselves up, with several others deserting him. However, after a cash bounty of £5 for every Aboriginal adult and £2 for every child captured and brought to Hobart was announced by Arthur, Robinson became more efficient at apprehending Palawa. Bruny Island as a holding place was forgotten about and Robinson shipped some of his captives to Hobart to claim the bounties.

On arriving at Launceston on the north coast in October 1830, Robinson found that the Black War had reached a climax and the colonists were organising a force of around 2,000 people, called the Black Line, to corral the remaining Palawa and force them into the Tasman Peninsula. Arthur wanted to commission the Tasman Peninsula as the ultimate holding place for the captured Palawa but in the meantime he designated Swan Island off the north-east coast in Bass Strait as the place where Robinson should relocate his captives.

=== Swan Island ===
Robinson arrived at Swan Island in November 1830 where he learnt that the Black Line operation was a failure, and that the Tasman Peninsula was no longer being considered as a site for incarceration. Robinson, therefore, explored the other Bass Strait islands in the area for a more permanent site, requisitioning female Palawa who had been abducted by sealers along the way. By this stage, a combined total of around 25 Palawa had been relocated to Swan Island by Robinson.

Despite the small number of captured Palawa, Arthur was very pleased with Robinson's efforts and rewarded him with a pay rise, a £100 bonus and a personal land grant. Furthermore, Robinson was commissioned to round up all the remaining Aboriginal people residing in the settled districts of Tasmania and remove them to a suitable island in the Bass Strait where he was to be in charge of them as Superintendent of Aborigines. Robinson agreed to Arthur's proposal and chose the isolated Gun Carriage Island as the location for the exile of the Palawa.

=== Gun Carriage Island, The Lagoons and Green Island ===
Robinson arrived at Gun Carriage Island in March 1831 with the Palawa who had been on Swan Island as well as others who had either been incarcerated in Hobart or were travelling with him. A total of around 60 Indigenous people were soon on the island. Supporting staff including a surgeon, a carpenter, convict labourers and several soldiers were also attached to the group. The island quickly proved inadequate for such a population. The old sealers huts which were used as accommodation were unhealthy, and the water supply was poor. Three Palawa died and 15 more were sick. In June, Robinson left these problems to Sergeant Alexander Wight and started on his new expedition to capture the remaining Aboriginal people in the settled areas of mainland Tasmania. He took twelve Palawa from Gun Carriage Island to assist him.

Wight treated the remaining Palawa on Gun Carriage Island as criminals and around August 1831, he relocated the whole establishment to a place on the south-west coast of Flinders Island known as The Lagoons. Here the Palawa were exposed to the cold westerly winds and the only water available was that dug from wells close to the beach. Twenty Aboriginal people died as a result, leaving only 20 surviving at The Lagoons.

In late 1831 and early 1832, the population at The Lagoons increased again to 66, as the Palawa captured by Robinson on mainland Tasmania were transported to the establishment. This increase in numbers frightened Wight, who thought the new war-hardened inmates would kill him. After some violence which saw a Palawa man being shot dead by a sealer, Wight panicked and again relocated the settlement to nearby Green Island for security reasons.

Robinson arrived at Green Island in February 1832 and relieved Wight of his duties. He moved the establishment back to The Lagoons and installed Ensign William James Darling with a contingent of eight soldiers of the 63rd Regiment to take charge and maintain order. A month later, Robinson again left after receiving a £1,000 offer from the colonial government to track down and remove all the remaining Palawa from Van Diemen's Land, most of whom were located in the rugged western region. Robinson took 15 Palawa guides with him, four of whom died within the first two months of this expedition.

Under Darling, conditions at The Lagoons improved and the Aboriginal population, which at this stage was around 80 people, mostly survived with only four deaths being reported by October 1832. Darling had also been tasked with overseeing a detailed survey of Flinders Island and if possible locating a better site for the establishment. A more advantageous location was decided upon near a place called Pea-Jacket Point (or Settlement Point), and in February 1833 Darling moved the establishment there. The name Wybalenna was given to the location, being derived from the word for "huts" in the language of the people from the Ben Lomond region. It is also translated as "Black Man's Houses".

== Life and death at Wybalenna ==
While at The Lagoons, Darling allowed the Aboriginal people stationed there to conduct traditional practices, such as corroborrees, hunting and building their own type of shelters which had good ventilation and access to a central campfire. However, after the move to Wybalenna, they were strongly encouraged to take on European practices such as wearing clothing, smoking tobacco, attending church services and not going into the bush to hunt. Additionally, they were forced to live in a terrace of small plastered and thatched rooms which were poorly ventilated and overcrowded.

Robinson, meanwhile, had been busy capturing the remaining Palawa in western Tasmania and sending them in the occasional boatload to Wybalenna. He had become reliant on force to convince these people to leave their homeland, often rounding them up at gunpoint. He congregated his captives at staging points such as Hunter Island and the tiny Grummet Island in Macquarie Harbour to await being shipped to Flinders Island. Around 20 adult and child Palawa died at these staging points. Those that made it onto the boats were obliged to remain on the deck for the journey to Wybalenna, exposed to cold winds and rain.

By May 1833, there were around 120 Palawa exiled at Wybalenna with only four of the terraced rooms having been built to accommodate them. A news report from the time described this situation as a "glorious achievement". By August of the same year, nineteen Palawa had died there, with a further thirteen dead by the end of 1833.

In 1834, the management of the establishment was transferred firstly to the facility's medical officer, Dr James Allen, and then to Mr Henry Nickolls. Allen and Nickolls warned the colonial authorities that the housing was neither warm nor dry, the soil was sterile, the water supply was unwholesome and the provisions provided were very inadequate. It was proposed that the establishment either be moved back to the Tasmanian mainland or even across Bass Strait to the Port Phillip District, but this was never acted upon.

Additionally, Nickolls made an official complaint in 1835 about the enforcement of Christianity upon the exiled Palawa, but received only a rebuke from the Lieutenant-Governor who stated that the teaching of the Bible was a priority to relieve "the unaccustomed mind of the savage...from the terrors" of life at Wybalenna.

=== Robinson takes charge of Wybalenna ===
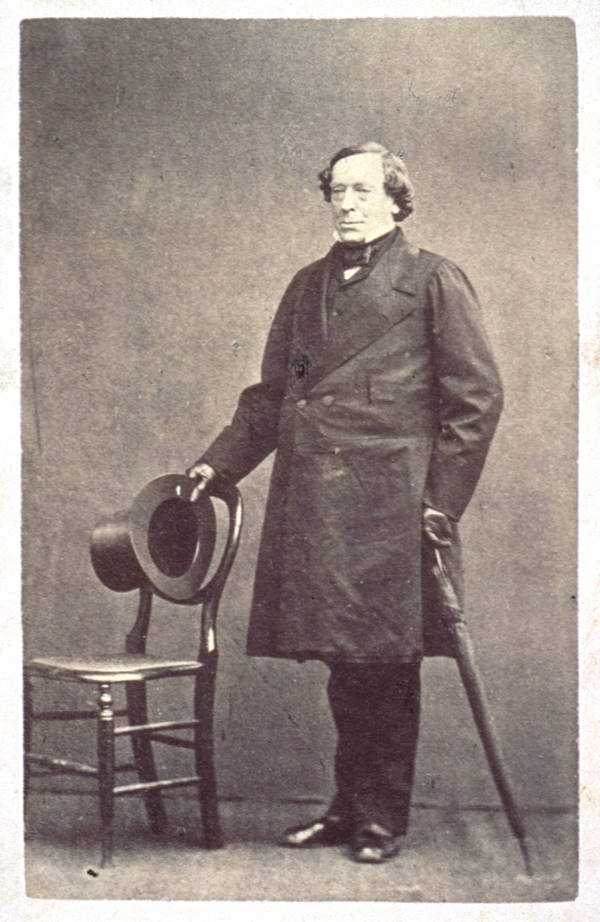
George Augustus Robinson

In 1835, Robinson had completed his mission of apprehending nearly all of the remaining Palawa on the Tasmanian mainland, with only one family group and perhaps a couple of individuals believed to have escaped being seized. He arrived at Wybalenna in October with his guides and the last batch of captives, and took charge of what remained of the Indigenous Tasmanians, which amounted to approximately 120 people.

The process of "civilising" the Palawa continued. Robinson replaced their Indigenous names with British ones, forced the men to labour, and encouraged the women to take on conventional European female roles of washing and sewing clothes. The children were separated from their parents and received immersive Christian instruction. The English language was strongly encouraged as the only language to communicate in, with Robinson promoting the establishment of the first ever Aboriginal Australian newspaper. Each edition was a single hand-written page and it was called the Flinders Island Chronicle. The editors were two Indigenous adolescents named Walter George Arthur and Thomas Brune who had learnt English at the orphan school in Hobart.

The supply of adequate food and water, and the conditions of the housing failed to improve, with a visiting official from Launceston concluding in 1836 that the Aboriginal occupants of Wybalenna were being deliberately exterminated. When James Backhouse visited the site in 1837, he noted that general health of the Aborigines was very poor.

These problems did not interfere with the construction of a chapel at Wybalenna, which was completed in 1838. Meanwhile, deaths were high and births were few, the infant mortality during this period being close to 100%. From the opening of the facility in 1833 up until the end of 1838, around 100 Palawa had died at Wybalenna.

Robinson ordered the medical officer at Wybalenna to perform autopsies on all the Palawa who died at Wybalenna. He also ordered the decapitation and removal of the skulls on at least 12 of the corpses. These skulls were later sold or given as curiosities to people such as Lady Jane Franklin and Joseph Barnard Davis. Seven of these Aboriginal Tasmanian skulls ended up at the American Museum of Natural History and three at the Royal College of Surgeons.

=== Robinson departs ===
Robinson, frustrated that the Wybalenna project was failing, attempted to obtain government permission to move the surviving Palawa to the Australian mainland. He was denied this request, but in 1839 was accepted to the role of Protector of Aborigines in the Port Phillip District. Robinson subsequently abandoned Wybalenna to take up this position. He took with him 15 of the most educated Palawa from the establishment including Truganini, Maulboyheenner and Walter George Arthur. Sixty Palawa remained at Wybalenna where government funding was immediately halved.

The new superintendent, Captain Malcolm Laing Smith, mostly left these sixty people to their own devices, but they were placed in a cell if they were insubordinate. Eight of the children were removed to an orphan school in Hobart. Smith was replaced firstly by Dr Peter Fisher and then by Dr Henry Jeanneret. In 1842, Wybalenna saw the return of seven of the 15 Aborigines who had left with Robinson in 1839 and it also saw the arrival of the last family group of Palawa from mainland Tasmania. This family, which included the child William Lanne, had evaded capture by Robinson but were now exiled to Flinder Island.

During this period, the policy of separating the children from the adults was continued. They were placed under the authority of the establishment's chaplain, Robert Clark and his wife. Clark treated the children brutally and one of the worst affected was the girl Mathinna.

Mathinna gave evidence in a subsequent inquiry, saying:

"I have been under the care of Mr and Mrs Clark when I was flogged I was placed across a table and my hands and feet were tied. I was flogged every day...I think I was flogged when I ought not to be flogged...I was once flogged when the blood ran down my head."

=== Aboriginal self-determination at Wybalenna ===
A leading young man of the exiled Ben Lomond people, Walter George Arthur, and his wife Mary Ann, had developed a strong understanding of their rights as British subjects while travelling with George Augustus Robinson. At Wybalenna, they led a campaign against the superintendent Dr Henry Jeanneret and his harsh control over the Aboriginal inmates. Their most significant action was to write a petition to Queen Victoria in 1846, complaining about Jeanneret's authoritarian rule. It was the first petition written by Indigenous Australian people to a reigning monarch, in which they wrote:

"Your Majesty's petitioners pray that you will not allow Dr Jeanneret to come again among us...he used to carry pistols in his pockets and threatened to shoot us...our houses were let fall down and they were never cleaned but covered with vermin...eleven of us died when he was here...he put many of us into jail for talking to him because we would not be his slaves.

They also wrote a similar letter to Lieutenant-Governor William Denison. Their campaign was successful in that an enquiry was established and Jeanneret was dismissed. The colonial office in London additionally recommended that the remaining Aborigines at Wybalenna be transferred back to the Tasmanian mainland. Denison, who was worried about the sealers near Wybalenna having sexual relations with the Palawa females and the rising "half-caste" population on nearby islands, agreed to shut Wybalenna down.

=== Closure of Wybalenna and transfer of survivors to Oyster Cove ===
In 1847, Jeanneret's replacement as superintendent, Dr Joseph Milligan, oversaw the shutdown of Wybalenna and the transfer of its Aboriginal occupants to Oyster Cove in south-east Tasmania. From 1839 to 1847, a further 30 Palawa had died at Wybalenna, leaving only 47 people to be relocated, including 15 men, 22 women and 10 children. Wybalenna was abandoned in mid October 1847.

== Aftermath ==
The Wybalenna site fell into disrepair after the relocation. The L-shaped terrace housing block gradually collapsed and the chapel was converted into a barn in 1854 by the graziers who took possession of the locality. When Thomas Reibey visited in 1862, he noted that the Aboriginal cemetery containing more than 100 graves had been disgracefully neglected, desecrated by roaming livestock.

Further desecration of the Aboriginal graves took place in the early 1870s when the professional collector Morton Allport commissioned the landowner at Wybalenna, Robert Gardner, to procure Palawa skeletons from the cemetery. Gardner, also known as "Resurrection Bob" for his grave-robbing skills, supplied at least four complete skeletons for Allport. These included the remains of Mannapackername, Lucy and Trowlebunner. It appears that the skeleton of Victoria Lanne (the sister of William Lanne) was also dug up, which Allport sold for the modern equivalent of €3,000 to the Royal Belgian Institute of Natural Sciences where her remains are still located.

In 1970, it was proposed to convert the site into a memorial. The owner at that time, Thomas Morton, agreed to sell the Wybalenna chapel (which he was using as a woolshed) to the National Trust of Australia but this never eventuated. Funds raised in this process were used to restore the chapel.

In 1973, the local Aboriginal residents, mostly descendants of the sealers' Indigenous wives who had remained in the area, established the Flinders Island Aboriginal Association. This association recognised the Wybalenna site, which contains Tasmania's largest known Aboriginal burial-ground, as holding great cultural and historical significance. Wider attention was brought upon Wybalenna with the production of a 1992 documentary film, "Black Man's Houses" directed by Steve Thomas. This included footage of an archaeological survey of the Wybalenna cemetery, which accurately mapped most of the graves of the Palawa buried there.

In the early 1990s a group of local Indigenous residents unofficially reclaimed the area to bring pressure on governments to return the site to Aboriginal people. They refurbished the Indigenous cemetery and placed markers on each of the graves, but these were later vandalised and removed.

Eventually in 1996, the Flinders Island Aboriginal Association and the Flinders Municipal Council signed an agreement to hand over the Wybalenna site to the Aboriginal community. In April 1999, the Premier of Tasmania formally transferred the title of the ‘Wybalenna Aboriginal Station Historic Site’ to the Flinders Island Aboriginal Community.

By 2023, further restoration of the nationally significant area at Wybalenna had been minimal due to lack of funding. The L-shaped terrace block remains obliterated and a plaque for the Palawa leader, Mannalargenna, who died at Wybalenna, was smashed and torn out by vandals. A small healing garden memorial was built next to the chapel.
