= Luggenemenener =

Indigenous Tasmanian

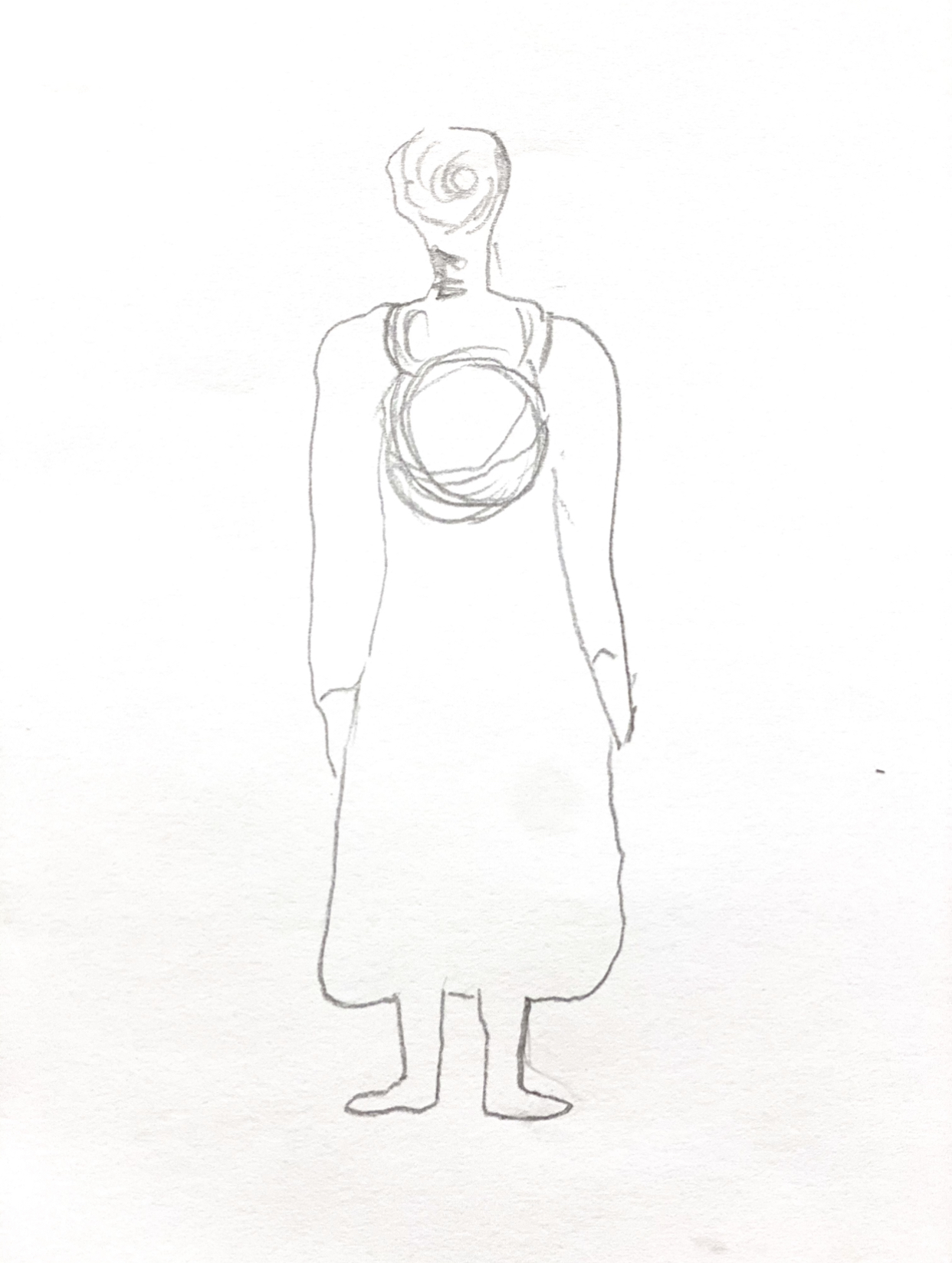
- Born: 1800s Ben Lomond
- Died: March 21, 1837; Flinders Island
- Known for: Leader of Ben Lomond Tribe
- Notable work: Defending The Ben Lomond People

Luggenemenener (c. 1800 – 21 March 1837) was an early nineteenth-century Tasmanian Aboriginal woman, who lived in the early 1800s. She endured the Black Wars and risked her life to protect her young son from a genocide of her people. Her homeland was in north-east Tasmania's Ben Lomond region. According to the French explorer Nicolas Baudin, Tasmania was originally known as Lutruwita.

== Early life and family ==
Luggenemenener was the mother of three sons. Walter, Maulboyheener, and Rolepana. Rolepa, Walter's father, was a powerful Ben Lomond leader. The Ben Lomond Nation, which consisted of at least three clans totalling 150–200 people, were the original inhabitants of the region. Luggenemenener threw herself over her little child, Rolepana, when the roving party threatened her People in 1829, completely covering him and saving his life. Rolepana was two years old at the time.

== Ben Lomond massacre ==
From 1828-1830, John Batman, who would later become Melbourne's "founding father", led a group called the ‘roving parties’ to round up and shoot Tasmanian Aboriginals and settle on the north-east land near Ben Lomond. These representatives were ‘trustworthy individuals’ who gave their services in return for land grants.

=== John Batman's Mission ===
Batman "had much slaughter to account for," as Tasmanian Colonial Governor George Arthur described it. A closer look at Governor Arthur's quote shows a more nuanced image of Batman's motivations and behaviour on behalf of the government in these so-called "roving groups". For example, in September 1829, Batman (aged 28) led an attack in Ben Lomond on an Aboriginal family group of 60–70 men, women, and children with the help of several "Sydney blacks" he brought to Tasmania. He "...ordered the men to fire upon them..." at 11 p.m. that night, when their 40-odd dogs raised the alarm and the Aboriginal people fled into dense scrub, killing an estimated 15 people. He left the next morning for his farm with two badly injured Tasmanian men, a woman, and her two-year-old son, all of whom he had captured. The captured woman was Luggenemenener.

=== Capturing ===
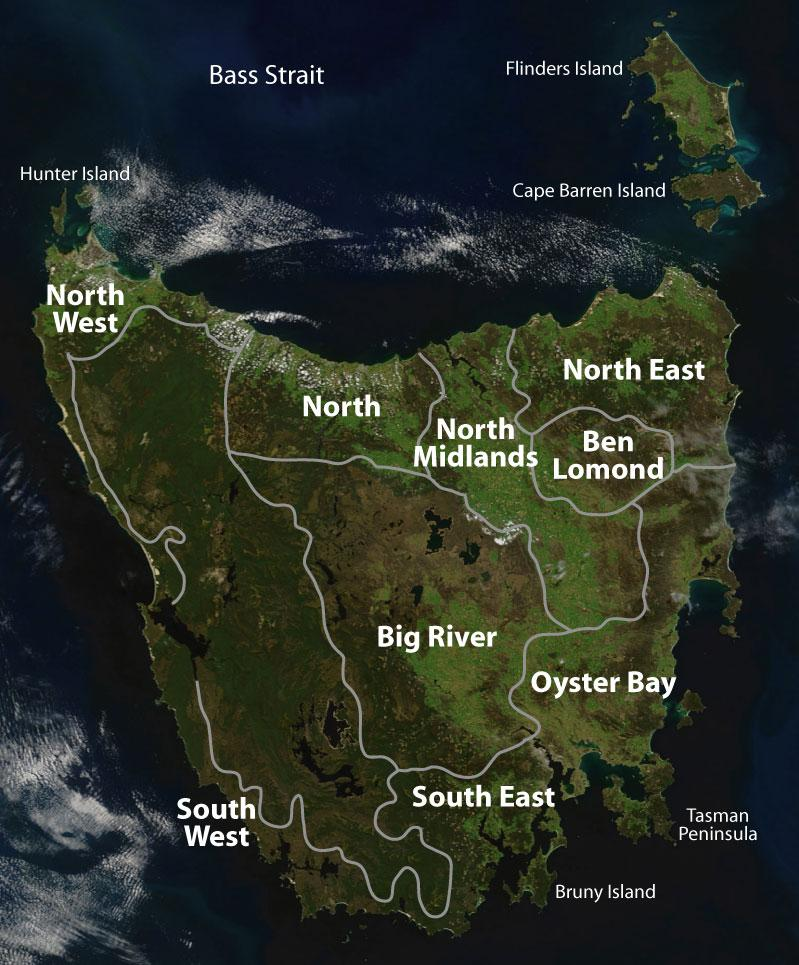
Tribes

Following the slaughter of her People, Batman apprehended Luggenemenener and Rolepana, as well as two severely injured persons. Batman's style is defined in a letter to the local police magistrate:

We found it quite impossible that the Two … [men] could, and after trying them by every means in my power, for some time, found I could not get them on. I was obliged therefore to shoot them.

=== Negotiation ===
Luggenemenener was dispatched to the Campbell Town jail and her child was taken to Batman's farm. This estate, known as "Kingston," was situated near the Ben Lomond rivulet in Deddington, on the slopes of Ben Lomond. Batman's Crown grant in 1824 was originally 500 acres, but it grew to 7,000 acres over time.

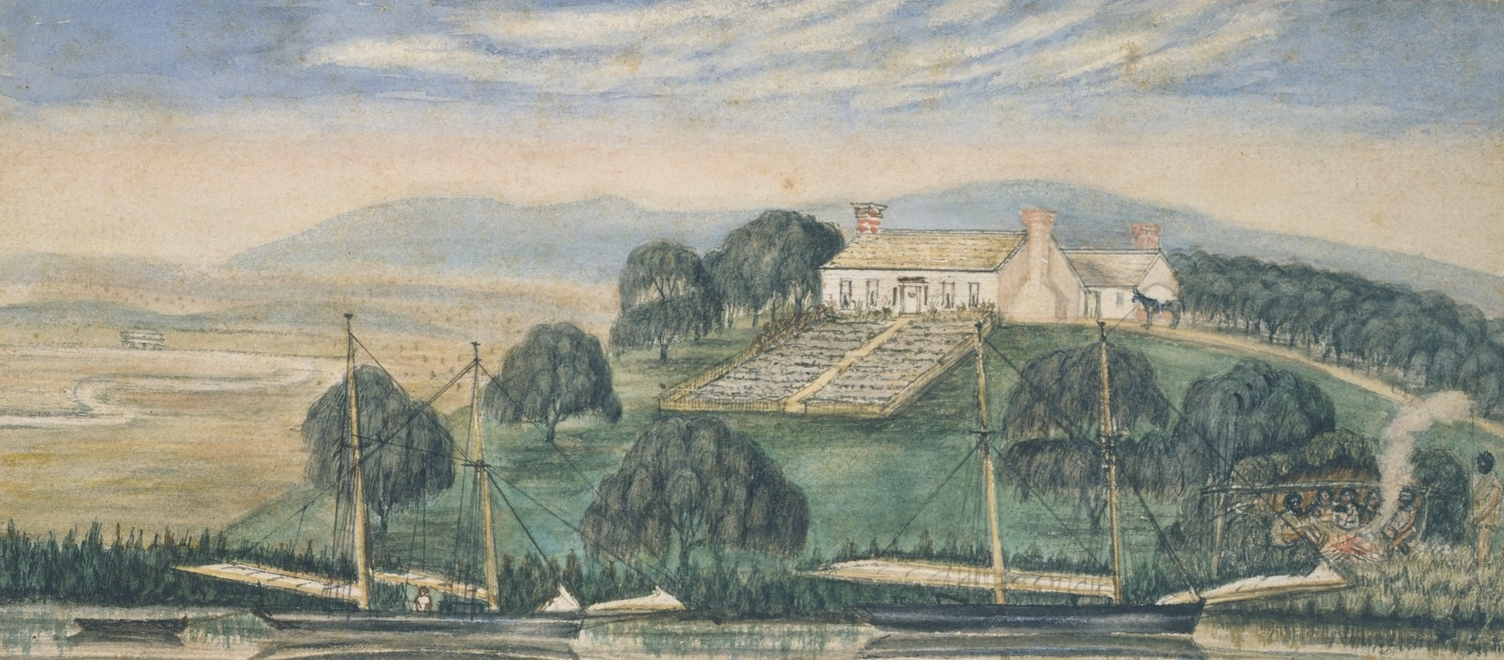
Kingston

== Rebellion ==
In 1830, after nearly a year in prison, Batman freed Luggenemenener on condition that she serve as his ambassador to a tribe he had been hunting for two years, the Ben Lomond People. He assigned her the difficult task of persuading the last of this tribe's members to surrender to the authorities. "They promised faithfully to return with all of their tribe," Luggenemenener wept as she shook hands with Batman, as he urged her to convince their band to surrender. She quickly made contact with the tribe, but since she had no intention of returning to jail nor bringing her people to Batman, she travelled freely until she encountered the Black Line soldiers and spent time both in and out of jail.

=== The Black Line ===
The Black Line was a sequence of survey lines drawn up by colonial forces in order to protect themselves from Aboriginal attacks as colonisation encroached on their homeland.

The Black Line was defended by approximately 2200 men, including militaries, free men, and 1,200 criminals.

According to Luggenemenener,

(T)he soldiers [extended] for a long way and that they kept firing off muskets. Said plenty of horsemen, plenty of soldiers, plenty of big fires on the hills. … [I] was afraid [the soldiers] would shoot [us].

Fearing that they would be shot by the soldiers, Luggenemenener persuaded the others to follow her to Batman's farm, where they arrived on October 19. They were aware that something significant was taking place. This band was led by the respected chief Mannalargenna, who used his diplomatic skills as a slave trader on the sea frontier to charm Batman and his neighbours. This friendliness, on the other hand, may have been a ruse. Mannalargenna and his band deserted Batman’s farm in the middle of the night, helping themselves to his dogs and supplies after obtaining food and protection for ten days. They raided two huts on the South Esk River the next day but were pursued by a group of whites. The band was surprised while plundering a hut at Fingal after a skirmish at Grants Mill, and two warriors were killed. They arrived at Cape Portland thirteen days later and began sending smoke signals to George Augustus Robinson, who had only a few days earlier formed a temporary mission on Swan Island. On the 15th of November, a group of envoys arrived to collect the one woman and five men of whom remained from this band to the mission.

== Flinders Island ==
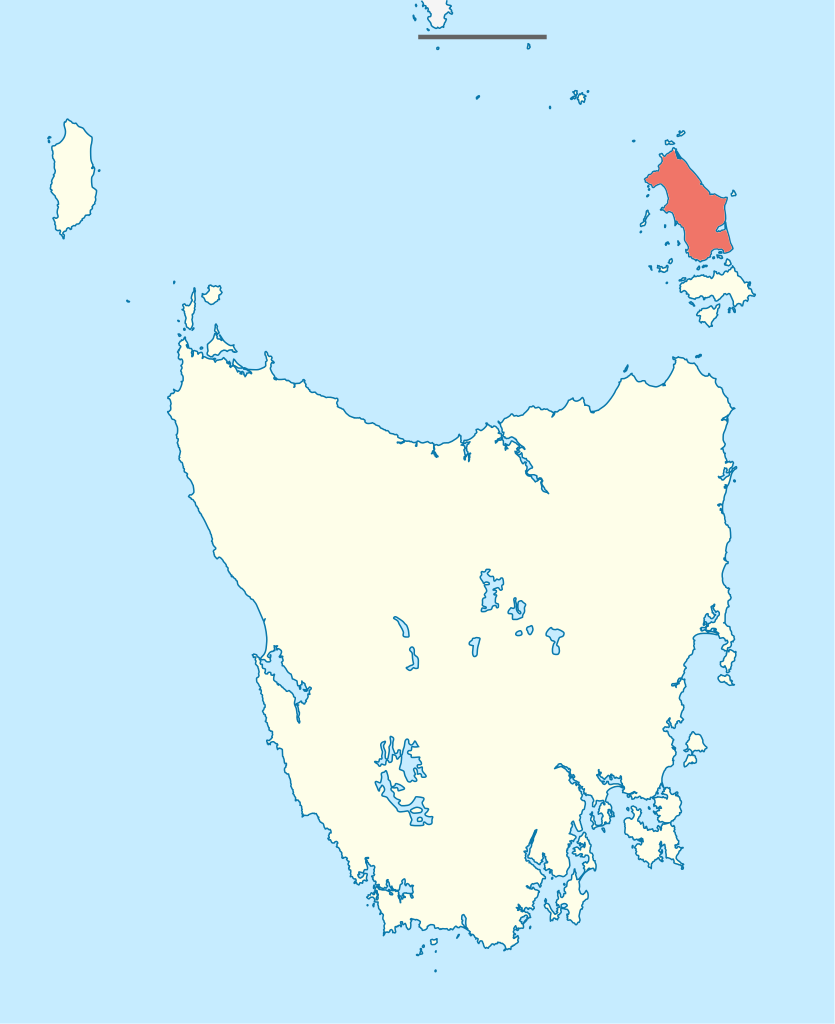
Flinder's Island

From 1830, the last of Tasmania's Aboriginal population, including Luggenemenener were banished to Flinders Island's Settlement Point (or Wybalenna Aboriginal Establishment, roughly translated as "Black Man's Houses" from the Ben Lomond language). These 160 survivors were deemed safe from white settlers in this area, but living conditions were bad, diseases spread quickly, and the resettlement scheme was short-lived. Luggenemenener died on March 21, 1837. George Augustus Robinson, the Protector of Aborigines on Flinders Island, dubbed her Queen Charlotte.

=== The last of the Ben Lomond people ===
Following a campaign by the Aboriginal community against their Commandant, Henry Jeanneret, which included a petition to Queen Victoria, the remaining 47 Aboriginals were moved again in 1847, this time to Oyster Cove Station, an ex-convict settlement 56 kilometres south of Tasmania's capital, Hobart, where Truganini, the last full-blood Tasmanian Aborigine, is thought to have died in 1876.

At the end of the Black War in 1834, Aboriginal "conciliator" George Augustus Robinson and Lieutenant-Governor Arthur urged that Rolepana, Luggenemenener’s son be brought to the Aboriginal establishment on Flinders Island.

Despite the Governor's approval for the return of the boy, Batman declined. Robinson would have a long-running feud with Batman over the boy, causing the latter to send his own son to Batman's property in Kingston to retrieve them.

== Stolen generation ==
When Batman travelled to Melbourne to settle Port Phillip, Rolepana, then eight years old, followed him. The relationship between Batman and Rolepana is hazy. It is likened to the early Stolen Generation, with a slavery mentality and the potential for all sorts of exploitation. Early colonists seem to have coveted native children. By refusing to let Rolepana and another boy leave his employ, Batman is said to have openly challenged the Governor and the Aboriginal Protector:

He claimed the boys were there with the consent of their parents … He … (said) they were ‘as much his property as his farm and that he had as much right to keep them as the government.

== Depiction ==
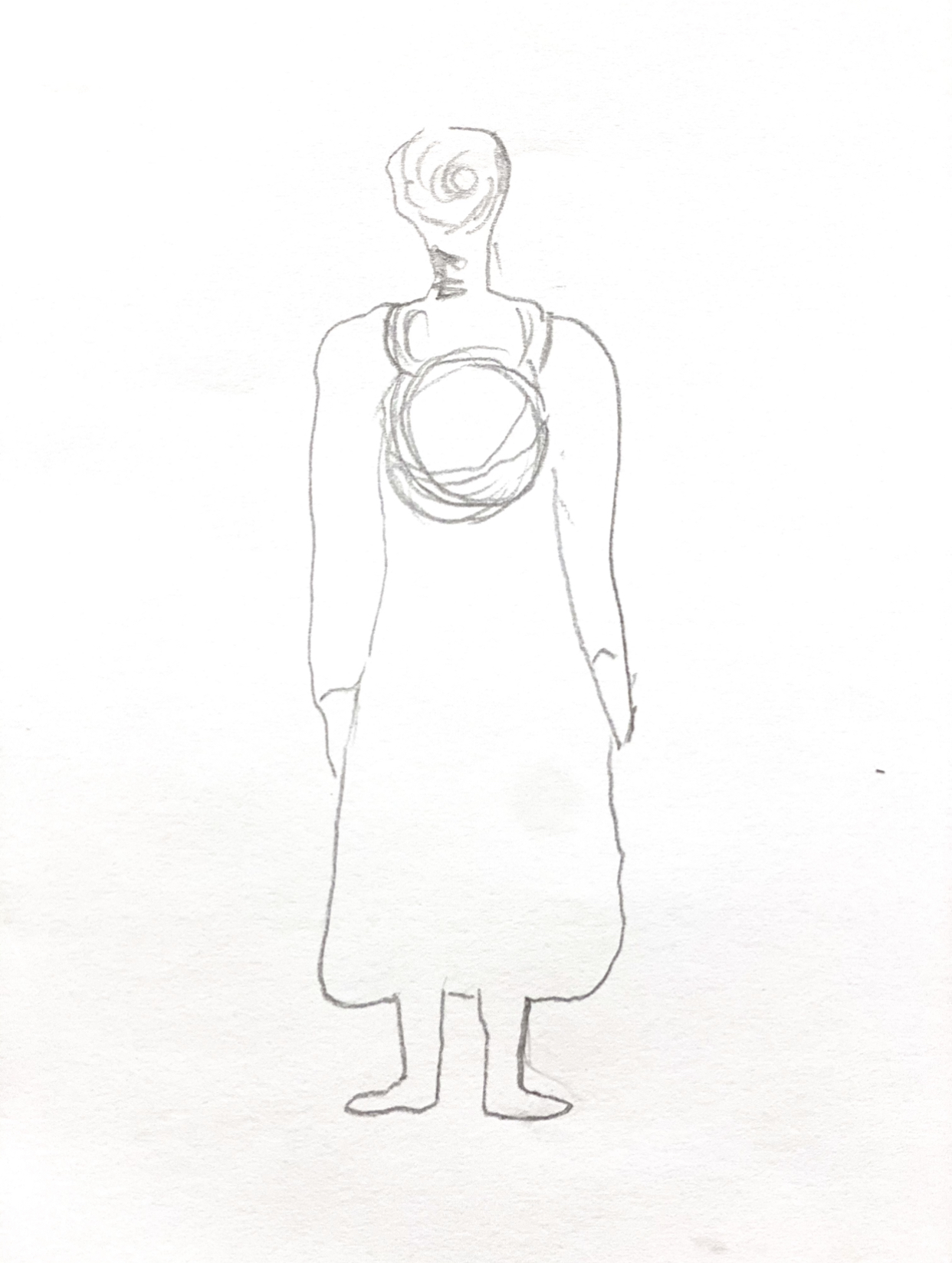
Adaptation of George Augustus Robinson's sketch that he drew in October 1832 of Luggenemenener

An adaptation of Robinson’s sketch, drawn in October 1832 is displayed below which shows Luggenemenener. She is depicted to be a plainly dressed woman with her hair pulled back. She has long strong arms. She appears to be very young. She has a large disc on her back, similar to a decorative backpack, which is a key feature. Robinson's writes about the tragedy to her life, and her sadness, as well as the beauty of the community, which undoubtedly gave her power.

A woman with circular pieces of rope [illegible] kin – appended to her back. Habilliments of mourning.

=== Grief ===
Robinson captures her cultural expression of grief, most likely out of curiosity. Aboriginals who are grieving are often described as inconsolable by their relatives:

[T]he gentle feelings of our natives are almost borne down with agonising sympathy.” “The poignancy of sorrow expressed by them on the death of their friends (which has been often truly painful to me to witness) cannot be surpassed among any class of people.

When traditional funerary rituals were observed, the magnitude of grief was reduced. The loss of a loved one during a war was difficult enough, but when conventional rituals to insure the soul's transmigration were unavailable, those left behind were terrified of the deceased spirit. The rituals were vital, and all efforts were made to recover the bodies of their fallen comrades.

The ashes of the dead were collected in a piece of Kangaroo-skin, and every morning, before sunrise, till they were consumed, a portion of them was smeared over the faces of the survivors, and a death song sung, with great emotions, tears clearing away lines among the ashes.

== Legacy ==
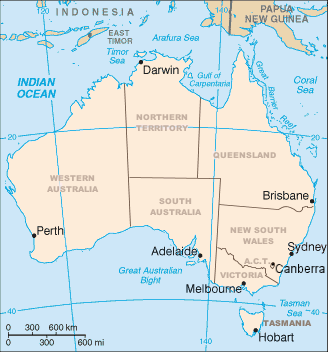
A clickable map of Australia's states, mainland territories and their capitals

Her mourning disc, which she wears every day, demonstrates the intense physicality of her cultural mourning: the patience needed to weave the rope pieces into a disc, the weight of the disc burdening the mourner as a constant reminder of lost loved ones and her young son. She is remembered as a young woman living far from her Ben Lomond homeland, marooned on a Bass Strait Island, her child taken from her, and her people murdered.

Tasmanian Aboriginal culture's rope and fibre weaving in jewellery, bags, and boats is a pattern that is possibly mirrored in Luggenemenener’s rope-entwined mourning dress.

== See also ==
- List of Indigenous Australian historical figures
