= Rebe Taylor =

Australian historian and author

- Born: London, England
- Occupation: Author, historian
- Education: University of Melbourne; Australian National University
- Genre: History
- Subject: Southeast Australian indigenous peoples and European settlements
- Notable works: Into the Heart of Tasmania: A Search for Human Antiquity

Rebe Taylor is an English-born Australian historian and author specialising in southeast Australian indigenous peoples and European settlement.

== Early life ==
Taylor was born in London and came to live in Adelaide, South Australia with her family at the age of five. As a child she had several film roles, including in For the Term of His Natural Life (1983) and the Scott Hicks film, Sebastian and the Sparrow (1988).

== Career ==
Taylor studied for her MA in history at the University of Melbourne, graduating in 1996. She completed her PhD at the Australian National University in 2004.

In 2015 she was awarded the inaugural Coral Thomas Fellowship by the State Library of New South Wales. At the end of her two-year term she gave the inaugural Coral Thomas Lecture titled "The untold story of the Wedge Collection" on John Helder Wedge.

In April 2018 she became Senior Research Fellow at the College of Arts, Law and Education at the University of Tasmania.

== Awards ==
- Winner, Non-Fiction Award at the Adelaide Festival Awards for Literature, 2004, for Unearthed: The Aboriginal Tasmanians of Kangaroo Island
- Winner, University of Southern Queensland History Book Award at the 2017 Queensland Literary Awards, for Into the Heart of Tasmania: A Search for Human Antiquity
- Winner, Tasmania Book Prize, Tasmanian Premier's Literary Prizes, 2017, for Into the Heart of Tasmania: A Search for Human Antiquity
- Winner, Dick and Joan Green Family Award for Tasmanian History, 2018, for Into the Heart of Tasmania: A Search for Human Antiquity

== Works ==
- Taylor, Rebe (2002), Unearthed : the Aboriginal Tasmanians of Kangaroo Island, Wakefield, ISBN 978-1-86254-552-6
- Taylor, Rebe (2017), Into the heart of Tasmania : a search for human antiquity, Melbourne University Publishing Limited, ISBN 978-0-522-86796-1
