= Tarenorerer =

Leader of Aboriginal Tasmanians

Tarenorerer, also known as Walyer, Montserrat, Tuculillo, or Walloa (c. 1800 – 5 June 1831), was a rebel leader of the Aboriginal Tasmanians. Between 1828 and 1830, she led a guerrilla band of indigenous people of both sexes against the British colonists in Tasmania during the Black War.

== Early life ==
Tarenorerer was born circa 1800 near Emu Bay, Van Diemen's Land as a member of the Tommeginne people. As a teenager, she was taken captive by Indigenous kidnappers and sold as a slave to British colonists in the Bass Strait Islands. During her captivity, she learned to speak English and how to use firearms. Two of her brothers and two of her sisters joined her with the sealers.

== Resistance ==
In 1828, Tarenorerer returned to northern Tasmania, where she gathered a guerrilla band of Indigenous warriors of both sexes and lead them against the colonists. As she was able to train them in using firearms, they were successful. George Augustus Robinson referred to her as an Amazon and was very concerned about her ability to incite a revolution. Tarenorerer escaped to Port Sorell with her brothers Linnetower and Line-ne-like-kayver and two sisters but was captured by sealers and taken to the Hunter Islands. They were then taken to Bird Island to catch seals and mutton birds.

Robinson also recorded words of her native language.

In December 1830, Tarenorerer was taken to Swan Island, where her identity was revealed. Her capture, Robinson said, was "a matter of considerable importance to the peace and tranquillity of those districts where she and her formidable coadjutors had made themselves so conspicuous in their wanton and barbarous aggression". She was imprisoned at the Gun Carriage (Vansittart) Island, where she fell sick and died of influenza in prison.

== See also ==
- Australian frontier wars
- List of Indigenous Australian historical figures
