= Black War =

War between British colonists and Aboriginal Tasmanians (1824–1832)

- Part of the Australian frontier wars
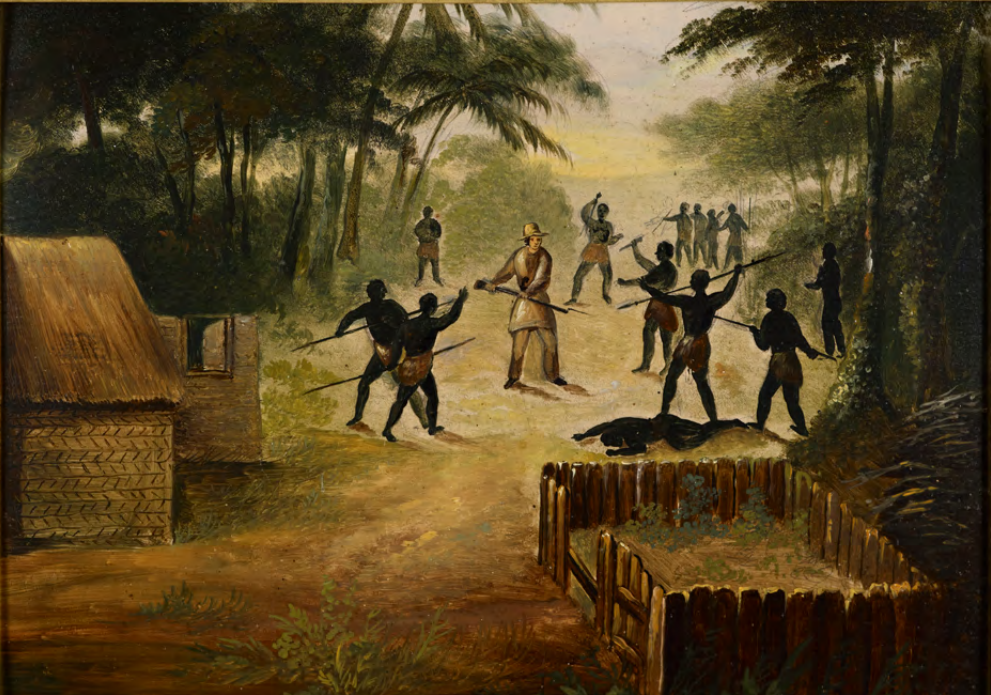
- An 1833 painting of Aboriginal Tasmanians attacking John Allen's Milton Farm near Great Swanport
Date	Mid-1820s–1832
Location	Tasmania
Result	British victory: Aboriginal Tasmanians dispossessed, population declines and culture disrupted; Survivors surrendered and relocated to the Wybalenna Aboriginal Mission
Territorial changes	British Empire controls Tasmania

Belligerents
British Empire: Van Diemen's Land; Van Diemen's Land Company	Aboriginal Tasmanians

Commanders and leaders
Thomas Davey; Edward Curr; Sir George Arthur, 1st Baronet; George Augustus Robinson	Eumarrah; Kikatapula; Mannalargenna; Montpelliatta; Tarenorerer; Tongerlongeter; Tunnerminnerwait

Casualties and losses
Dead: 219; Wounded: 218; Total: 437	600–900 dead

The Black War was a period of violent conflict between British colonists and Aboriginal Tasmanians in Tasmania from the mid-1820s to 1832 which precipitated the near-extermination of the Indigenous population. The conflict was fought largely as a guerrilla war by both sides; some 600 to 900 Aboriginal Australians and more than 200 British colonists died.

When a British penal settlement was established in Tasmania (then called Van Diemen's Land) in 1803, the Aboriginal population was 3,000 to 7,000 people. Until the 1820s, the British and Aboriginal people coexisted with only sporadic violence, often caused by competition for game and abductions of Aboriginal women and children by settlers. Conflict intensified from 1824, as Aboriginal warriors resisted the rapid expansion of British settlement over their land. In 1828, the British declared martial law and in 1830 they unsuccessfully attempted to force hostile Aboriginal nations from the settled districts in a military operation called "the Black Line". In a series of "Friendly Missions" in 1830 and 1831, George Augustus Robinson and his Aboriginal negotiators - including Truganini - secured the surrender of the Aboriginal belligerents. Martial law was revoked in January 1832.

Almost all of the remaining Aboriginal people were removed from mainland Tasmania from 1832 to 1835, and the 220 survivors were eventually relocated to the Wybalenna Aboriginal Mission on Flinders Island. Infectious diseases and a low birth rate cut the Aboriginal population at Wybalenna to 46 when the mission was closed in 1847.

The frequent mass killings and near-destruction of the Aboriginal Tasmanians are regarded by some contemporary historians as genocide. Others argue that the colonial authorities did not intend to destroy the Aboriginal population.

== Etymology ==
The terms "Black War" and "Black Line" were coined by journalist Henry Melville in 1835. In the early 21st century, historian Lyndall Ryan has argued that the conflict should be known as the "Tasmanian War". She has also called for a public memorial to be commissioned to honour the dead on both sides of the war.

== Early conflict ==
Although commercial sealing on Van Diemen's Land had begun in late 1798, the first significant European presence on the island came in September 1803 with the establishment of a small British military outpost at Risdon Cove on the Derwent River near present-day Hobart.

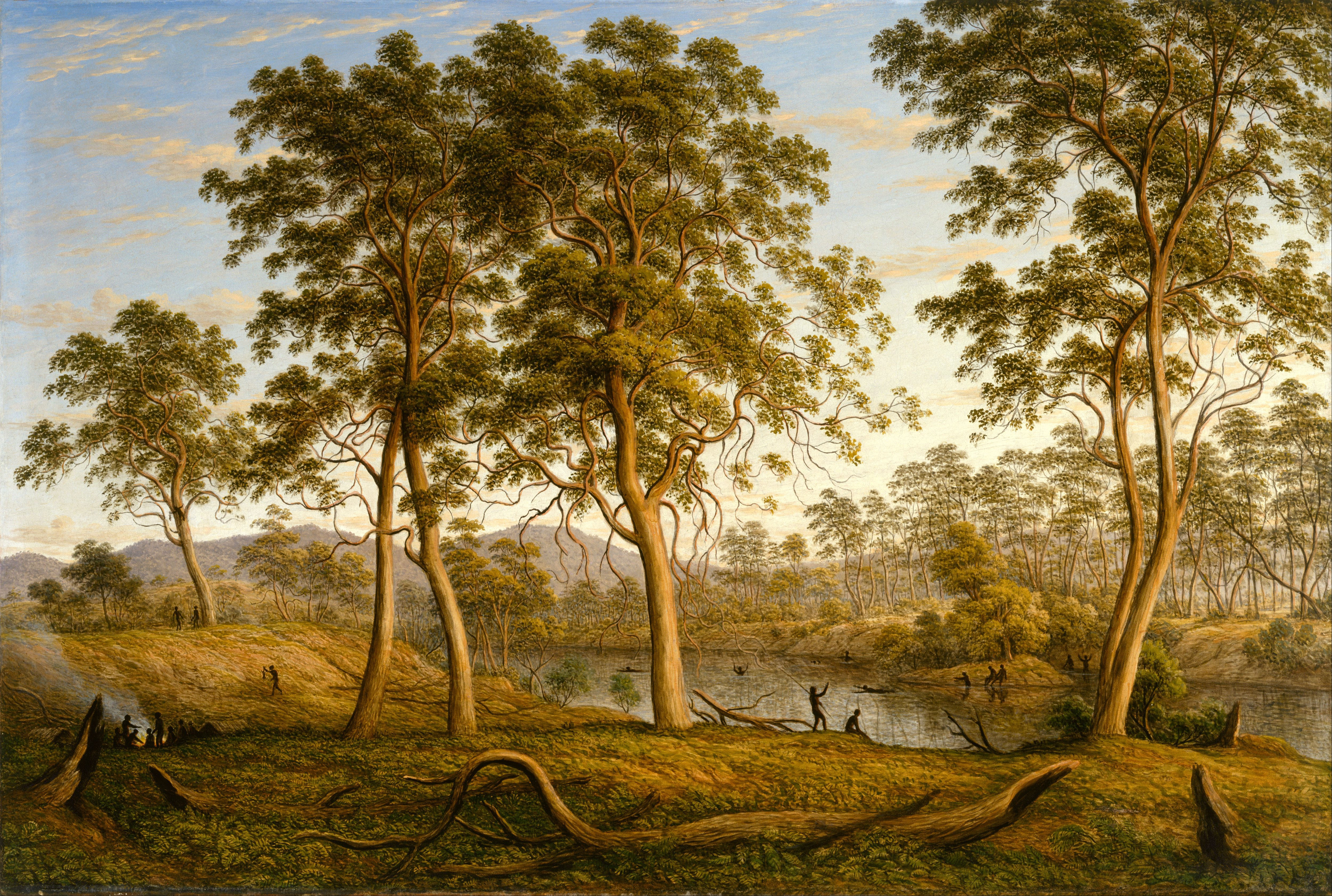
Natives on the Ouse River, Van Diemen's Land by John Glover, 1838

The British had several hostile encounters with Aboriginal clans over the next five months, with shots fired and an Aboriginal boy abducted. David Collins arrived as the colony's first lieutenant governor in February 1804 with instructions from London that any acts of violence against the Aboriginal people were to be punished. But he failed to publish those instructions, leaving an unclear legal framework for dealing with any violent conflict.

On 3 May 1804, soldiers, settlers and convicts from Risdon Cove fired on a hunting party of 100 to 300 Aboriginal people. The British commanding officer stated that he thought the Aboriginal group was hostile. Witnesses to the massacre stated that between three and 50 Aboriginal men, women and children had died.

By 1806, the British had founded two main penal settlements on the sites of modern Hobart and Launceston. Violence increased during a drought in 1806–7 as tribes in the south of the island killed or wounded several colonists in six incidents mostly sparked by competition for game. There were only three hostile encounters recorded in the northern settlements before 1819, although John Oxley stated in 1810 that convict bushrangers inflicted "many atrocious cruelties" on Aboriginal people which led to Aboriginal attacks on solitary white hunters.

The Tasmanian settlements grew slowly up to 1815, with the population reaching 1,933 people that year. Growth was mainly through the arrival of 600 colonists from Norfolk Island between 1805 and 1813, and 149 male convicts from England in 1812. Former convicts and the Norfolk Islander settlers were given small grants of land. By 1814, 12,700 hectares (31,000 acres) of land was under cultivation, with 5,000 cattle and 38,000 sheep. Conflict with Aboriginal people increased, mainly due to sporadic murders and colonists hunting game and kidnapping Aboriginal women and children to enslave for domestic work and sexual abuse.

Between 1815 and 1830, the colony expanded rapidly. The British population grew from 2,000 to 24,000, the number of sheep increased to 680,000 and cattle to 100,000. The settled districts—mainly in the midlands, eastern coast and northwestern region of the island—accounted for almost 30 per cent of its land area. The expansion of the colony over Aboriginal hunting grounds led to increased conflict which, according to Nicholas Clements, developed into an Aboriginal resistance movement. Aboriginal attacks on colonists averaged 1.7 per year over the 1803–1823 period, but increased to 18 per year over 1824–1826.

Particularly from the late 1820s, the Aboriginal people were also driven by hunger to plunder settlers' homes for food as their hunting grounds shrank, native game disappeared, and the dangers of hunting on open ground grew.

Clements states that the main reasons for frontier violence against Aboriginal people were revenge, killing for sport, sexual desire for women and children, and suppression of the native threat. Male colonists outnumbered females six to one in 1822 and Clements argues that a "voracious appetite" for Aboriginal women was the most important immediate trigger for the Black War. After 1828 settler violence was mainly motivated by fear of Aboriginal attacks and a growing conviction among those on the frontier that extermination of the Aboriginal population was the only means by which peace could be secured.

== Crisis years (1825–1831) ==
From 1825 to 1828, the number of Aboriginal attacks on colonists and their property more than doubled each year. Clements states that although the colonists knew they were fighting a war, "this was not a conventional war, and the enemy could not be combated by conventional means. The blacks were not one people, but rather a number of disparate tribes. They had no home base and no recognisable command structure."

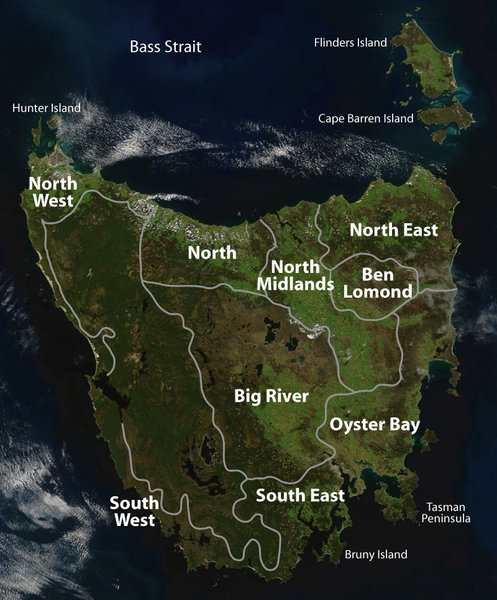
Tasmanian tribes at the time of first European contact

George Arthur, governor of the colony since May 1824, had issued a proclamation on his arrival that placed Aboriginal people under the protection of British law and threatened prosecution for anyone who murdered them. Two Aboriginal men were hanged in September 1826 for the murder of three colonists and Arthur hoped that this would deter further attacks on colonists. But between September and November 1826 six more colonists were murdered, taking the number of colonists killed in the conflict to 36 since 1823. The Colonial Times newspaper advocated the removal of all Aboriginal people from the settled districts to an island in the Bass Strait, warning: "if not, they will be hunted down like wild beasts, and destroyed!"

On 29 November 1826, Arthur issued a notice authorising settlers to treat hostile Aboriginal groups as open enemies and to use arms to force them from the settled districts. He also deployed additional soldiers and police to these areas. The Colonial Times saw this as a declaration of war on Aboriginal people in the settled districts. Historian Lyndall Ryan argues that Arthur intended to force the surrender of the hostile Aboriginal tribes. Clements states that the November proclamation failed to clarify when it was legal for settlers to kill Aboriginal people.

Over the summer of 1826–27, warriors from the Big River, Oyster Bay and North Midlands nations killed a number of stock-keepers on farms. The colonists responded with reprisal raids, in which many Aboriginal people were killed. On 8 December 1826, a group led by Kikatapula threatened a farm overseer at Bank Hill farm at Orielton, near Richmond; the following day soldiers from the 40th Regiment killed 14 Oyster Bay people and captured another nine, including Kikatapula.

In April 1827, two shepherds were killed at a farm at Mount Augusta, south of Launceston, and a pursuit party launched a reprisal attack at dawn on an Aboriginal camp, killing up to 40 Aboriginal men, women and children. In May 1827, a group of Oyster Bay Aboriginal people killed a stock-keeper at Great Swanport near Swansea. A pursuit party of soldiers, police and civilians later attacked an Aboriginal camp killing at least six people.

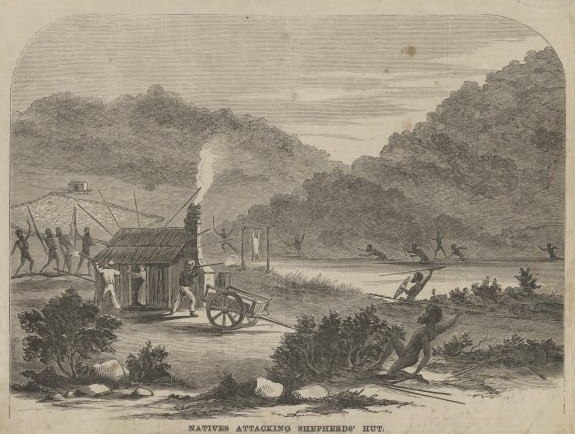
Samuel Calvert's depiction of Aboriginals attacking a shepherds' hut as released in The Illustrated Melbourne Post

In June 1827, at least 80 to 100 members of the Pallittorre clan from the North nation were killed in reprisals for the killing of three stockmen. From December 1826 to July 1827, at least 140 Aboriginal people were killed, and Ryan suggests that the figure might be over 200 for their killing of 15 colonists.

In September 1827, Arthur appointed another 26 field police and deployed another 55 soldiers into the settled districts to deal with the rising conflict. Between September 1827 and the following March, at least 70 Aboriginal attacks were reported on the frontier, taking the lives of 20 colonists. By March 1828 the death toll in the settled districts for the 16 months since Arthur's November 1826 official notice had risen to 43 colonists and up to 350 Aboriginal people.

Although Arthur received reports that Aboriginal people were more interested in plundering huts for food than in killing colonists, settlers also reported Aboriginal warriors shouting, "Go away, go away!", burning crops and huts, and stating that they intended to kill every white man on the island. Clements states that much of the Aboriginal violence in the early stages of the war was targeted revenge for killings and abductions by the colonists, but that the arson and killing of livestock were clearly acts of resistance.

Arthur reported to the Colonial Office secretary in London that the Aboriginal people "already complain that the white people have taken possession of their country, encroached upon their hunting grounds, and destroyed their natural food, the kangaroo". In January 1828, he proposed settling the Aboriginal people "in some remote quarter of the island, which should be reserved strictly for them, and to supply them with food and clothing, and afford them protection ... on condition of their confining themselves peaceably to certain limits". His preferred location for the reserve was Tasmania's north-east coast and he suggested they remain there "until their habits shall become more civilised".

On 19 April 1828, Arthur issued a "Proclamation Separating the Aborigines from the White Inhabitants". The proclamation aimed to remove Aboriginal Tasmanians from the settled districts of eastern, central and north-western Tasmania as a precursor to negotiations with them for a reserve in the north-east region which was largely uncolonised and was traditionally visited by many Aboriginal groups for its abundant native game and other foods. The proclamation authorised colonists to use violence to expel Aboriginal people from the settled districts in defined circumstances. The restrictions on violence were unclear and difficult to enforce and the settled districts were not well defined. Historian James Boyce states that in practice: "Any Aborigine could now be legally killed for doing no more than crossing an unmarked border that the government did not even bother to define."

Arthur admitted that the British were "the first aggressors" but thought continued violence could only be prevented by enforcing the ban on Aboriginal people entering the settled areas. He deployed almost 300 troops from the 40th and 57th Regiments at 14 military posts along the frontier and within the settled districts. This measure appeared to deter Aboriginal attacks. Through the winter of 1828, few Aboriginal people appeared in the settled districts, and those that did were driven back by military parties. Among them were at least 16 Oyster Bay people who were killed in July at their encampment in the Eastern Tiers by a detachment of the 40th Regiment.

=== Martial law (November 1828) ===
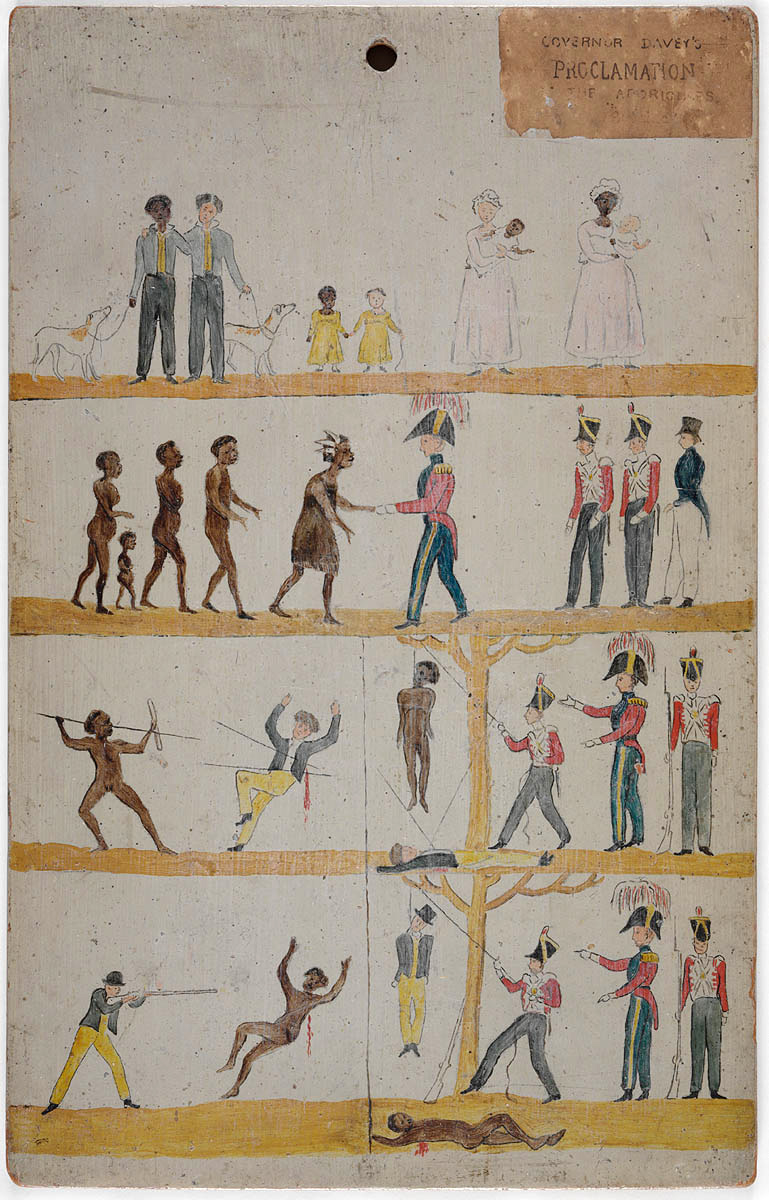
Proclamation board labelled "Governor Davey's Proclamation" painted in Van Diemen's Land about 1830, in the time of Governor Arthur. Nailed to trees, proclamation boards were designed to show Aboriginal people the benefits of living in peace with colonists under an idealised equal British justice.

Violence escalated from August to October 1828, with the Oyster Bay, Big River, Ben Lomond and Northern peoples launching raids on stock huts during which 15 colonists were killed in 39 attacks. From early October, Oyster Bay warriors also began killing white women and children. On 1 November, Arthur declared martial law against the Aboriginal people in the settled districts, who were now "open enemies of the King". Arthur's move was effectively a declaration of war. Soldiers were authorised to arrest any Aboriginal person in the settled districts without warrant and to shoot those who resisted. The proclamation also stated:

... that the actual use of arms be in no case resorted to, if the Natives can by other means be induced or compelled to retire into the places and portions of this Island herein before excepted from the operation of Martial Law; that bloodshed be checked, as much as possible; that any Tribes which may surrender themselves up, shall be treated with every degree of humanity; and that defenceless women and children be invariably spared.

Martial law would remain in force for more than three years, the longest period in Australian history. Although the proclamation authorised only the military to shoot Aboriginal people in the settled districts on sight, in practice other colonists did so with impunity. Only one colonist was ever prosecuted for killing an Aboriginal person.

About 500 Aboriginal people from five clan groups were still operating in the settled districts when martial law was declared and Arthur's first action was to encourage civilian parties to capture them. On 7 November, a party operating from Richmond captured Umarrah — a leader of the North Midlands nation — and four others including his wife and a child. Umarrah remained defiant and was jailed for over a year.

Arthur established military patrols from the 39th, 40th and 63rd Regiments that scoured the settled districts for Aboriginal people, whom they should capture or shoot. By March 1829, about 400 troops were deployed in the settled districts and about 200 soldiers patrolled the area in 23 parties of eight to 10 men. Patrols usually included convict police who were familiar with the area and sometimes included Aboriginal guides from outside the settled areas. Settlers also formed patrols whose official role was to capture Aboriginal people.

The main tactic of the military and settler patrols was to execute dawn raids on Aboriginal camps and there are many reported massacres of six or more Aboriginal people in these raids. The patrols reportedly killed 60 Aboriginal people and captured from 20 to 30 in the two years from November 1828. Ryan estimates the Aboriginal death toll was at least 200 by March 1830.

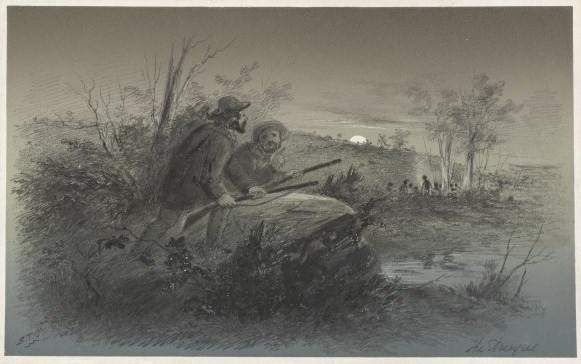
Samuel Thomas Gill's depiction of a night-time punitive raid on an Aboriginal camp

In the first six months of 1829, the Oyster Bay people killed eight convict workers in the Pitt Water district. This was followed by a lull in fighting before a wave of attacks in the spring and summer. Overall, 33 colonists were killed in 1829 compared with 27 the previous year.

In mid-1829 Arthur estimated that there were 2,000 Aboriginal people in the colony. Other estimates by the colonists ranged from 500 to 5,000. Settlers reported that the Oyster Bay people were moving in considerably smaller groups, but sightings of the Big River people in groups of 100 or more continued. It is likely that the massacres, privation and a falling birth rate had reduced the Aboriginal population to under 1,000 and that less than 300 remained in southeastern Tasmania.

Arthur also pursued conciliation. In March 1829, he established an Aboriginal mission on Bruny Island in the hope it would attract Aboriginal people from the settled districts. He also commissioned "proclamation boards" with drawings meant to show Aboriginal people the benefits of living peacefully with the colonists under an ideal British justice in which whites would be hanged for killing blacks and blacks hanged for killing whites.

Violence did not abate. There were 60 Aboriginal attacks on colonists from November 1829 to March 1830, most of them in the Clyde, Oatlands and Richmond police districts. Settlers reported arson attacks on buildings and crops which threatened the viability of their farms. In late 1829, one police magistrate informed Arthur that he needed three times his allocation of soldiers to protect local settlers. In February 1830, settlers and the press launched a campaign for increased military protection on the frontier and the removal of hostile tribes to the Bass Strait islands.

The predominant mood among colonists on the frontier was fear and panic mixed with anger and a desire for revenge. Although by the end of 1829 the number of Aboriginal people in the war zone had greatly diminished, this was not widely known and the threat that the remaining hostile Aboriginal groups posed to frontier farms was real.

In November 1829, Arthur established an Aborigines Committee to inquire into the causes of the Aboriginal violence and make policy recommendations. The following February, he introduced a bounty of £5 for every captured Aboriginal adult and £2 for each child. He also sought the help of other colonies in increasing the military presence in Van Diemen's Land but without success.

=== The Aborigines Committee ===
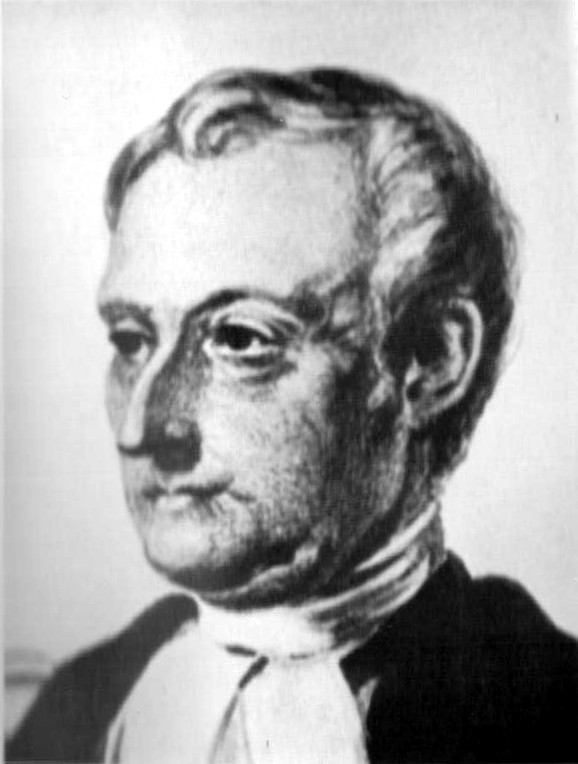
Archdeacon William Broughton, who headed the Aborigines Committee

In March 1830, Arthur appointed Anglican Archdeacon William Broughton as chairman of the seven-man Aborigines Committee inquiring into the conflict. Since the declaration of martial law in November 1828 there had been 120 Aboriginal attacks on colonists, resulting in about 50 colonists dead and over 60 wounded. The inquiry was conducted in the context of a further escalation in hostilities: in February there were 30 separate incidents in which seven Europeans were killed.

Among submissions it received were suggestions to set up decoy huts containing poisoned flour and sugar, that Aboriginal people be rooted out with bloodhounds and that Māori warriors be brought to Tasmania to capture the Aboriginal people for removal to New Zealand as slaves. Settlers and soldiers gave evidence of killings and atrocities on both sides, but the committee was also told that despite the attacks, some settlers believed very few Aboriginal people now remained in the settled districts.

In its report, published in March 1830, the committee stated that the Aboriginal people had lost their sense of superiority of white men, no longer feared British guns, and were now on a systematic plan of attacking the colonists and their possessions. The committee's report supported the bounty system, recommended more mounted police, and urged settlers to remain well armed and alert.

Arthur forwarded their report to Secretary of State for War and the Colonies Sir George Murray, blaming convicts for mistreating the Aboriginal people but adding, "it is increasingly apparent the Aboriginal natives of this colony are, and have ever been, a most treacherous race; and that the kindness and humanity which they have always experienced from the free settlers has not tended to civilize them to any degree." Murray stated in response that the Aboriginal people could become extinct in the near future and that any British conduct with that aim would "leave an indelible stain upon the character of the British Government."

Arthur accepted most of the committee's recommendations but only deployed a small number of additional mounted police due to the expense and a shortage of horses in the colony. He also advised London that an increase in the convict population in remote frontier areas would help protect settlers and asked that all convict transport ships be diverted to Van Diemen's Land.

The war continued. In April, the military and colonists killed at least 12 Big River and Pallittorre people in separate encounters. From April to early August, there were 22 Aboriginal attacks in the Clyde district in which three colonists were killed and nine wounded. Arthur had heard that two of his emissaries, George Augustus Robinson and Captain Welsh, had established friendly contacts with Aboriginal groups outside the settled districts. On 19 August, he issued a notice informing settlers of this success and advising them not to harm or capture any non-hostile Aboriginal person in search of food. He also warned settlers that the bounty would not be paid to colonists who captured friendly Aboriginal people and that anyone killing them would be prosecuted.

Following the killing of a prominent settler on 22 August, a group of settlers wrote to Arthur protesting against his change in policy. The Aborigines Committee and Executive Council also advised him that stronger measures were required to subdue the hostile Oyster Bay and Big River nations. In response, Arthur extended martial law to the whole of Van Diemen's Land on 1 October. He also ordered every able-bodied male colonist to assemble on 7 October at one of seven designated places to join a massive drive to sweep the hostile Aboriginal people from the settled districts in a military campaign which became known as the Black Line. The news was greeted enthusiastically by the colonist press. The Hobart Town Courier said that it doubted settlers would need persuading "to accomplish the one grand and glorious object now before them".

=== Northwestern conflict ===
The Aboriginal people of northwestern Tasmania had sporadic and sometimes violent encounters with the British before the region was colonised in 1826. The colonists were servants of the Van Diemen's Land Company which had been granted land for grazing sheep and cattle. An escalating cycle of violence broke out in 1827 after company shepherds killed an Aboriginal man and abducted Aboriginal women for sex. A shepherd was speared and more than 100 sheep killed in retribution, and colonists responded with a dawn attack on an Aboriginal campsite, killing 12. The conflict led to the Cape Grim massacre of 10 February 1828 in which shepherds armed with muskets ambushed up to 30 Aboriginal people as they collected shellfish at the foot of a cliff.

On 21 August 1829, four company servants killed an Aboriginal woman at Emu Bay, near present-day Burnie. An investigation was launched but no one was prosecuted. Three company men were fatally speared in July and October 1831 and there were heavy losses inflicted on sheep and oxen. There were 16 recorded acts of violence against Aboriginal people in the conflict, but the number of Aboriginal deaths is unknown. Company employees stated that they believed killing Aboriginal people was justified to protect livestock.

The population of the northwestern clans fell from an estimated 400-700 at the time of colonisation to about 100 by 1835. The population of the neighbouring northern Aboriginal people fell from 400 in 1826 to fewer than 60 by mid-1830. Violence in the northwest ceased in 1834 but resumed between September 1839 and February 1842 when Aboriginal people made at least 18 attacks on company men and property.

=== Military strategy and tactics ===
Aboriginal warriors conducted a guerrilla war against the British. They mostly used three weapons: spears, rocks and waddies. They almost always attacked during the day in war parties of 10 to 20 men. Although they favoured ambushes and hit-and-run raids against isolated shepherds and settler huts, sieges of huts for up to a day were not uncommon. Warriors often lit fires or used women to lure colonists out of their huts and into an ambush. They quickly learned that muskets could only be fired about once every 30 seconds, so they often encouraged colonists to fire then closed in for an attack. War parties would sometimes divide into separate diversionary and main attack groups and then disperse after an attack to make pursuit more difficult. Attacks on livestock and arson of buildings and crops were also common but were not used systematically as a major war strategy.

The main British military response involved official pursuit parties and roving parties. Pursuit parties mostly consisted of soldiers and convicts whose task was to track down Aboriginal groups presumed to be responsible for a particular attack. They were usually in the field for 12 to 48 hours. Roving parties were groups of soldiers, convicts and authorised civilians who patrolled the frontier for 12 to 18 days at a time with the aim of dispersing hostile Aboriginal groups. The main tactic of the official parties was to attack at night after campfires had revealed the position of the Aboriginal groups. Although their instructions were to capture hostile Aboriginal people where possible, in practice a successful ambush of a campsite almost always led to lethal violence. The main weapons used in ambushes were the Brown Bess musket, bayonets and clubs.

Vigilante groups mainly consisted of convicts but settlers and their employees were often involved. They generally used the same weapons and tactics as the official parties but probably inflicted more deaths on Aboriginal groups.

== Black Line, October–November 1830 ==
The Black Line of October to November 1830 consisted of 2,200 men: about 550 soldiers, 738 convict servants and 912 civilians. Arthur, who maintained overall control, placed Major Sholto Douglas of the 63rd Regiment in command of the forces. Separated into three divisions and aided by Aboriginal guides, they formed a staggered front more than 300 km long that began pushing south and east across the Settled Districts from 7 October. The intention was to form a pincer movement to push members of four of the nine Aboriginal nations across the Forestier Peninsula to East Bay Neck and into the Tasman Peninsula, which Arthur intended to declare an Aboriginal reserve.

The campaign was hampered by severe weather, difficult terrain, inadequate maps and poor supply lines. Although two of the divisions met in mid-October, the difficult terrain soon resulted in the cordon being broken, leaving many wide gaps through which the Aboriginal people were able to easily pass. Many of the colonists, by then barefoot and their clothes tattered, deserted the line and returned home. The campaign's single success was a dawn ambush on 25 October in which two Aboriginal people were captured and two killed. The Black Line was disbanded on 26 November.

When the Black Line commenced, about 300 members of the hostile Big River, Oyster Bay, Ben Lomond and North Midlands nations were still alive and about 100 to 200 of these were within the line's field of operations. They launched at least 50 attacks on colonists—both in front of and behind the line—during the campaign, often plundering huts for food.

== Surrender and removal ==
=== Surrender in the settled districts ===
Following the Black Line campaign, there were probably only about 100 hostile Aboriginal people in the settled districts, although the colonists believed the figure was at least 500. Hopes of peace rose over the summer of 1830-31 as Aboriginal attacks fell to a low level. The Colonial Times newspaper speculated that their enemy had either been wiped out or frightened into inaction. However, there was a new wave of attacks in late January and March in which several colonists were killed, and many men on the frontier refused to go out to work.

In February 1831, the Aborigines Committee issued a report recommending that settlers should remain vigilant and that parties of armed men should be stationed in the most remote stock huts. In response, up to 150 stock huts were turned into ambush locations, military posts were established on native migratory routes and new barracks were built at Spring Bay, Richmond and Break O'Day Plains. There was an increased military presence at farms, and military parties of 50 to 90 men sometimes went out in pursuit of hostile Aboriginal groups.

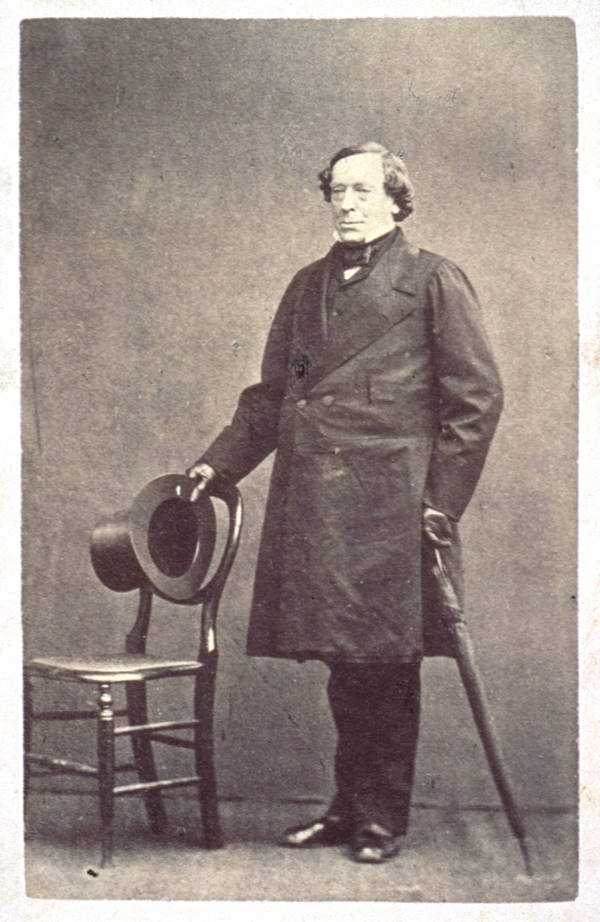
George Augustus Robinson

The committee also endorsed the government's attempts to conciliate the hostile Aboriginal clans. In March 1829, George Augustus Robinson had been appointed the head of the Aboriginal Mission on Bruny Island where about 20 survivors of the southeastern Aboriginal people were accommodated. From January to September 1830, Robinson and 19 Aboriginal negotiators had carried out a "Friendly Mission" to establish contacts with the Aboriginal clans of southwestern, western and northwestern Tasmania. In October that year, he reported to Arthur that his mission had been a partial success and the governor authorised him to seek conciliation with the northeastern clans.

By January 1831, Robinson's party had contacted more than fifty Aboriginal people and had moved them temporarily to Swan Island in Bass Strait. Those moved to the island included the resistance leader Mannalargenna, whose group had killed a number of colonists. In February, Arthur appointed Robinson to head an Aboriginal Establishment on the Furneaux Islands and authorised him to negotiate the surrender of the remaining Big River and Oyster Bay people. In March, the 53 Aboriginal Tasmanians under Robinson's care were transferred to a settlement on Gun Carriage Island (now Vansittart Island).

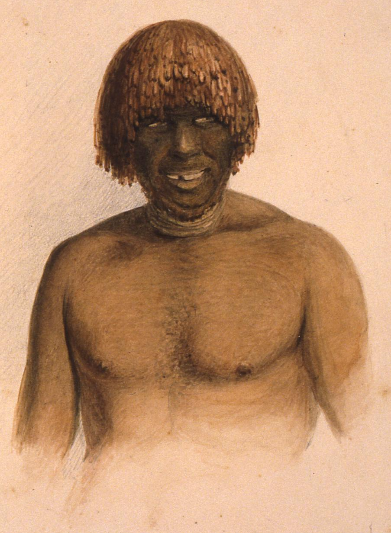
Montpelliatta

In June, Robinson and a party of Aboriginal negotiators set off to locate a resistance group led by Umarrah which had conducted a series of raids killing several colonists. The public mood swung further against Arthur's conciliatory approach after an Aboriginal group led by Montpelliatta conducted further raids in the Great Western Tiers culminating in the death of two prominent settlers in August. The Launceston Advertiser declared that only "utter annihilation" could subdue the Aboriginal people.

Several weeks later, an Aboriginal group robbed huts at Great Swansea and, in late October, 100 armed settlers formed a cordon across the narrow part of Freycinet Peninsula in an attempt to capture several dozen Aboriginal people who had entered the peninsula. The cordon was abandoned four days later after the Aboriginal people slipped through and escaped at night.

Robinson's efforts at conciliation were more successful. In September, he and Mannalargenna persuaded Umarrah and his group to suspend hostilities. The following month, Robinson and Mannalargenna met Arthur to discuss the terms of a surrender. Robinson, Mannalargenna and Umarrah then set off for the interior to locate and negotiate with the remaining hostile Big River and Oyster Bay groups. On 31 December, they made contact with a party of 26 Big River and Oyster Bay people led by Montpelliatta and Tongerlongeter. Umarrah's wife, Woolaytopinnyer, persuaded them to surrender.

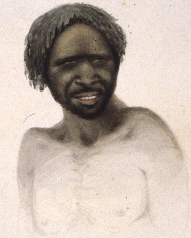
Tongerlongeter

Robinson led the 26 Aboriginal people to Hobart where they surrendered to governor Arthur on 7 January 1832. Ten days later, the groups led by Montpelliatta, Tongerlongeter and Umarrah were sent to Flinders island where the Aboriginal Establishment had been relocated the previous November.

The December surrender effectively ended the Black War, and martial law was revoked in January 1832. There had been 70 Aboriginal attacks on colonists in 1831, in which 33 colonists were killed or wounded. But the number of attacks had been well below the 250 recorded in 1830, and it was now clear that the remnants of the hostile Aboriginal clans had been exhausted, hungry and desperate throughout 1831.

There were no further reports of Aboriginal attacks in the eastern settled districts from December 1831, although isolated acts of violence continued in the north until 1834 and in the northwest until 1842. The death toll from 1832 to 1834 was ten colonists and 40 Aboriginal people.

=== Removal of western Aboriginal nations ===
Arthur authorised Robinson to negotiate the surrender of the remaining southwestern and western Aboriginal clans and their removal to Flinders Island, believing that this would be the only way of saving them from extermination at the hands of settlers while providing them with the benefits of British civilisation and Christianity. In February 1832, Robinson and his Aboriginal negotiators embarked on the first of several expeditions to the west and north-west of Tasmania. His party persuaded several small groups to seek refuge on Flinders Island, warning them that they faced violent hostility without protection.

After a hostile encounter with a group of 29 Tarkiner people at Arthur River in September, Robinson resolved to use force if necessary to secure the removal of the remaining Aboriginal people. Hunter Island, at Tasmania's northwestern tip, and penal stations in Macquarie Harbour, on the western coast, were used to hold captured Aboriginal people until their transfer to Flinders Island, but many succumbed quickly to disease and the mortality rate reached 75 percent.

=== Aftermath ===
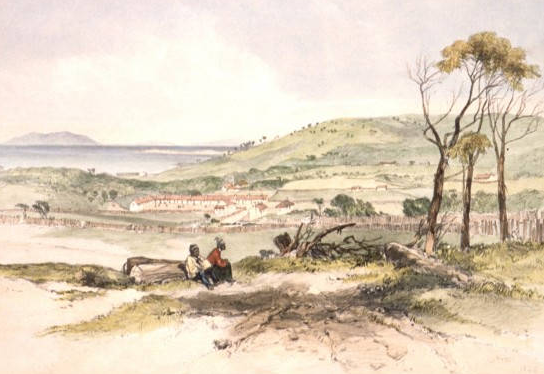
1846 painting of Wybalenna Aboriginal Establishment on Flinders Island, where Aboriginal Tasmanians were interned after surrendering.

By early 1835 almost 300 people had surrendered to Robinson, who reported to the colonial secretary that the entire Aboriginal population had been removed to Flinders Island. A family was discovered near Cradle Mountain in 1836 and they eventually surrendered in 1842. Aboriginal women also continued to live with sealers on the Bass Strait islands and small Aboriginal groups remained in the Great Western Tiers.

In February 1833 the Aboriginal Establishment was moved to a more suitable location on Flinders Island and renamed Wybalenna. Children attended school, men were expected to work in the garden, build roads, erect fences and shear sheep, while women were required to cook, wash clothes, sew and attend evening school. All were expected to attend Scripture classes and wear European clothes and many were given European names. Convicts were assigned to do most of the labour and the Aboriginal people were free to roam the island where they hunted and gathered food and performed traditional ceremonies. Despite the presence of a resident doctor, a high rate of respiratory disease cut the population from about 220 in 1833 to 46 in 1847.

== Population and death toll ==
=== Deaths ===
Phase	Aboriginal people killed (est.)	Colonists killed	Total
Nov 1823—Nov 1826	80	40	120
Dec 1826—Oct 1828	408	61	469
Nov 1828—Jan 1832 (martial law)	350	90	440
Feb 1832—Aug 1834	40	10	50
Total	878	201	1079
Source: Ryan (2012). p. 143

Historians acknowledge that recorded killings in the Black War are minimum figures because most killings of Aboriginal people went unreported. Nevertheless, Clements concludes that even if only reported deaths are considered, annual deaths per head of population were over 600 per 10,000, making the Black War one of the deadliest in history.

Ryan, based on a contemporary newspaper estimate, states that there were 1,200 Aboriginal people in the settled districts in 1826. She estimates that 838 Aboriginal people were killed in eastern Tasmania from November 1823 to January 1832 and that 40 more were killed in the following period to August 1834.

Clements states that the recorded Aboriginal death toll in the conflict was 260. He estimates that only 100 Aboriginal people survived the eastern conflict from a pre-war population of 1,000, and he therefore concludes that 900 died from 1824 to 1831. He surmises that about one-third may have died through internecine conflict, disease and natural deaths, leaving an estimated 600 deaths from frontier violence. He states: "The true figure might be as low as 400 or as high as 1,000." Johnson and McFarlane argue that at least 400 Aboriginal deaths in the northwestern conflict should be added to this figure, giving over 1,000 Aboriginal deaths in the conflict across Tasmania.

Ryan states that there were 191 recorded deaths of colonists in the conflict from November 1823 to January 1834, and another 10 deaths after this. Clements, who studied a wider range of sources, states that there were 450 casualties among colonists, including 219 recorded deaths, in the eastern conflict from 1824 to 1831. The number killed or wounded was probably under-reported due to administrative inefficiency and because the colonists did not want to discourage British investment in, and emigration to, the colony.

=== Aboriginal population decline ===
Estimates of Tasmania's Aboriginal population in 1803, the year of British settlement, range from 3,000 to 7,000. Lydall Ryan, citing studies by N.J.B Plomley, Rhys Jones, Colin Pardoe and Harry Lourandos, reaches a figure of 7,000 spread throughout the island's nine nations. Nicholas Clements, also citing Plomley, Jones and others, estimates the population at 3,000 to 4,000. Johnson and McFarlane state that the consensus figure is 4,500 to 5,000.

Historians also disagree over the extent and causes of Aboriginal population decline before the Black War. Ryan argues that the population of some clans near the two main British settlements probably declined from 1803 to 1807 due to settler violence, although other clans possibly prospered from the introduction of hunting dogs. She states that by 1819 the Aboriginal and British population reached parity with about 5,000 of each, although among the colonists men outnumbered women four to one. At that stage both population groups enjoyed good health, with infectious diseases not taking hold until the late 1820s. She therefore concludes that settler violence was the main cause of Aboriginal population decline before the Black War.

Clements believes that frontier violence does not explain population decline in the first 20 years of British settlement as there were few colonists in the interior. He argues that reduced fertility caused by venereal diseases was probably a significant cause of early population decline. He also states that although the health of the Aboriginal population was generally good, at least one southern Aboriginal clan was decimated by other introduced diseases before the Black War.

Boyce also argues that the impact of violence and disease on the Aboriginal population was moderate up to 1816 and that there is no evidence of low numbers of children and elderly people nor critically low numbers of women. Johnson and McFarlane argue that kidnapping of Aboriginal women by sealers was a key factor in the population decline of Aboriginal clans in the northern and southern coastal regions.

== Historiography ==
=== Conflict and depopulation ===
Writing in 2002, Keith Windschuttle argued that the Aboriginal population in 1803 was only about 2,000, that only 118 Aboriginal people were killed in the conflict with British settlers, and that the conflict was an outbreak of criminality rather than a war. His arguments have been challenged by numerous authors including James Boyce, Henry Reynolds, Lyndall Ryan and Nicholas Clements who conclude that the conflict was an Aboriginal war of liberation in which 600 to 900 Aboriginal Tasmanians were killed.

Geoffrey Blainey and Josephine Flood argue that although Aboriginal deaths in the conflict were devastating, the major cause of Aboriginal depopulation was disease. Ryan and Boyce argue that the Aboriginal death rate from disease was low before 1820 and that Aboriginal Tasmanians were more likely to die from disease after they had surrendered to the British.

=== Academic discussion of genocide ===
The near-destruction of Tasmania's Aboriginal population has been described as an act of genocide by historians and genocide scholars including Robert Hughes, James Boyce, Lyndall Ryan, Tom Lawson, Mohamed Adhikari, Benjamin Madley, Ashley Riley Sousa, Rebe Taylor, and Tony Barta. The author of the concept of genocide, Raphael Lemkin, considered Tasmania the site of one of the world's clear cases of genocide and Hughes has described the loss of Aboriginal Tasmanians as "the only true genocide in English colonial history". Other historians – including Henry Reynolds, Richard Broome, and Nicholas Clements – do not agree that the colonial authorities pursued a policy of destroying the Indigenous population, although they do acknowledge that some settlers supported extermination.

Boyce states that the April 1828 "Proclamation Separating the Aborigines from the White Inhabitants" sanctioned force against Aboriginal people "for no other reason than that they were Aboriginal". Reynolds, Broome and Clements state there was open warfare at the time. Boyce describes the decision to remove all Aboriginal Tasmanians after 1832—by which time they had given up their fight against white colonists—as an extreme policy position. He concludes: "The colonial government from 1832 to 1838 ethnically cleansed the western half of Van Diemen's Land and then callously left the exiled people to their fate."

As early as 1852 John West's History of Tasmania portrayed the obliteration of Tasmania's Aboriginal people as an example of "systematic massacre" and in the 1979 High Court case of Coe v Commonwealth of Australia, judge Lionel Murphy observed that Aboriginal people did not give up their land peacefully and that they were killed or forcibly removed from their land "in what amounted to attempted (and in Tasmania almost complete) genocide".

Historian Henry Reynolds writes that there was a widespread call from settlers during the frontier wars for the "extirpation" or "extermination" of the Aboriginal people. But he has contended that the British government acted as a source of restraint on settlers' actions. Reynolds says there is no evidence the British government deliberately planned the wholesale destruction of indigenous Tasmanians—a November 1830 letter to Arthur by Sir George Murray warned that the extinction of the race would leave "an indelible stain upon the character of the British Government"—and therefore what eventuated does not meet the definition of genocide codified in the 1948 United Nations convention. He says that Arthur was determined to defeat the Aboriginal people and take their land, but believes that there is little evidence that he had aims beyond that objective and wished to destroy the Tasmanian race. In contrast to Reynolds' argument, historian Lyndall Ryan, based on a sample of massacres taking place in the Meander River region in June 1827, concludes that massacres of Aboriginal Tasmanians by white settlers were likely part of an organised process and were sanctioned by government authorities.

Clements accepts Reynolds' argument but also exonerates the colonists themselves of the charge of genocide. He says that, unlike genocidal determinations by Nazis against Jews in World War II, Hutus against Tutsis in Rwanda and Ottomans against Armenians in present-day Turkey which were carried out for ideological reasons, Tasmanian settlers participated in violence largely out of revenge and self-preservation. He adds: "Even those who were motivated by sex or morbid thrillseeking lacked any ideological impetus to exterminate the natives." He also argues that while genocides are inflicted on defeated, captive or otherwise vulnerable minorities, Tasmanian natives appeared as a "capable and terrifying enemy" to colonists and were killed in the context of a war in which both sides killed noncombatants.

Lawson, in a critique of Reynolds' stand, argues that genocide was the inevitable outcome of a set of British policies to colonise Van Diemen's Land. He writes that the British government endorsed the use of partitioning and "absolute force" against Tasmanians, approved Robinson's "Friendly Mission" and colluded in transforming that mission into a campaign of ethnic cleansing from 1832. He writes that once on Flinders Island, the indigenous peoples were taught to both farm land like Europeans and worship God like Europeans and concludes: "The campaign of transformation enacted on Flinders Island amounted to cultural genocide."

Writing in 2023, historian Rebe Taylor states that Windschuttle is in a minority among historians who generally accept the Black War as a case of genocide.

== See also ==
- List of massacres of Indigenous Australians
- Trugernanner and Fanny Cochrane Smith
- Manganinnie, an Australian 1980 film
- The Nightingale, an Australian 2018 film
- Tunnerminnerwait
- Conflict in Van Diemen's Land
- List of genocides

== Bibliography ==
- Adhikari, Mohamed (25 July 2022). Destroying to Replace: Settler Genocides of Indigenous Peoples. Indianapolis: Hackett Publishing Company. ISBN 978-1647920548.
- Barta, Tony (2023). "A Very British Genocide: Acknowledgement of Indigenous Destruction in the Founding of Australia and New Zealand". In Kiernan, Ben; Blackhawk, Ned; Madley, Benjamin; Taylor, Rebe (eds.). The Cambridge World History of Genocide. Vol. II: Genocide in the Indigenous, Early Modern and Imperial Worlds, from c.1535 to World War One. Cambridge University Press. pp. 46–68. doi:10.1017/9781108765480. ISBN 978-1-108-48643-9.
- Boyce, James (2010). Van Diemen's Land. Melbourne: Black Inc. ISBN 978-1-86395-491-4.
- Broome, Richard (2019). Aboriginal Australians: a history since 1788 (5th ed.). Crows Nest, NSW: Allen & Unwin. ISBN 9781760528218.
- Calder, Graeme (2010). Levée, Line and Martial Law. Launceston: Fullers Bookshop. ISBN 978-0-64653-085-7.
- Clements, Nicholas (2014). The Black War. Brisbane: University of Queensland Press. ISBN 978-0-70225-006-4.
- Clements, Nicholas (2013). Frontier Conflict in Van Diemen's Land (PhD thesis) (PDF) (Thesis). University of Tasmania.
- Flood, Josephine (2019). The Original Australians: the story of the Aboriginal People (2nd ed.). Crows Nest, NSW: Allen & Unwin. ISBN 9781760527075.
- Hughes, Robert (1987). The Fatal Shore. London: Pan. ISBN 0-330-29892-5.
- Johnson, Murray; McFarlane, Ian (2015). Van Diemen's Land: An Aboriginal History. University of New South Wales Press. ISBN 9781742234212.
- Lawson, Tom (2014). The Last Man: A British Genocide in Tasmania. London: I. B. Tauris. ISBN 978-1-78076-626-3.
- Madley, Benjamin (2004). "Patterns of frontier genocide 1803–1910: the aboriginal Tasmanians, the Yuki of California, and the Herero of Namibia". Journal of Genocide Research. 6 (2): 167–192. doi:10.1080/1462352042000225930. S2CID 145079658.
- Reynolds, Henry (2001). An Indelible Stain?. Sydney: Penguin. ISBN 978-0-67091-220-9.
- Reynolds, Henry (2012). A History of Tasmania. Melbourne and New York: Cambridge University Press. ISBN 9780521548373.
- Ryan, Lyndall (2012). Tasmanian Aborigines. Sydney: Allen & Unwin. ISBN 978-1-74237-068-2.
- Shipway, Jesse (2017). The Memory of Genocide in Tasmania, 1803–2013: Scars on the Archive. Palgrave Studies in the History of Genocide. Palgrave Macmillan. doi:10.1057/978-1-137-48443-7. ISBN 978-1-137-48443-7.
- Sousa, Ashley Riley (2004). ""They will be hunted down like wild beasts and destroyed!": a comparative study of genocide in California and Tasmania". Journal of Genocide Research. 6 (2): 193–209. doi:10.1080/1462352042000225949. S2CID 109131060.
- Taylor, Rebe (2023). "Genocide in Van Diemen's Land (Tasmania), 1803–1871". In Kiernan, Ben; Blackhawk, Ned; Madley, Benjamin; Taylor, Rebe (eds.). The Cambridge World History of Genocide. Vol. II: Genocide in the Indigenous, Early Modern and Imperial Worlds, from c.1535 to World War One. Cambridge University Press. pp. 481–507. doi:10.1017/9781108765480. ISBN 978-1-108-48643-9.
