= Woureddy =

Aboriginal Tasmanian leader (c. 1790 –1842)

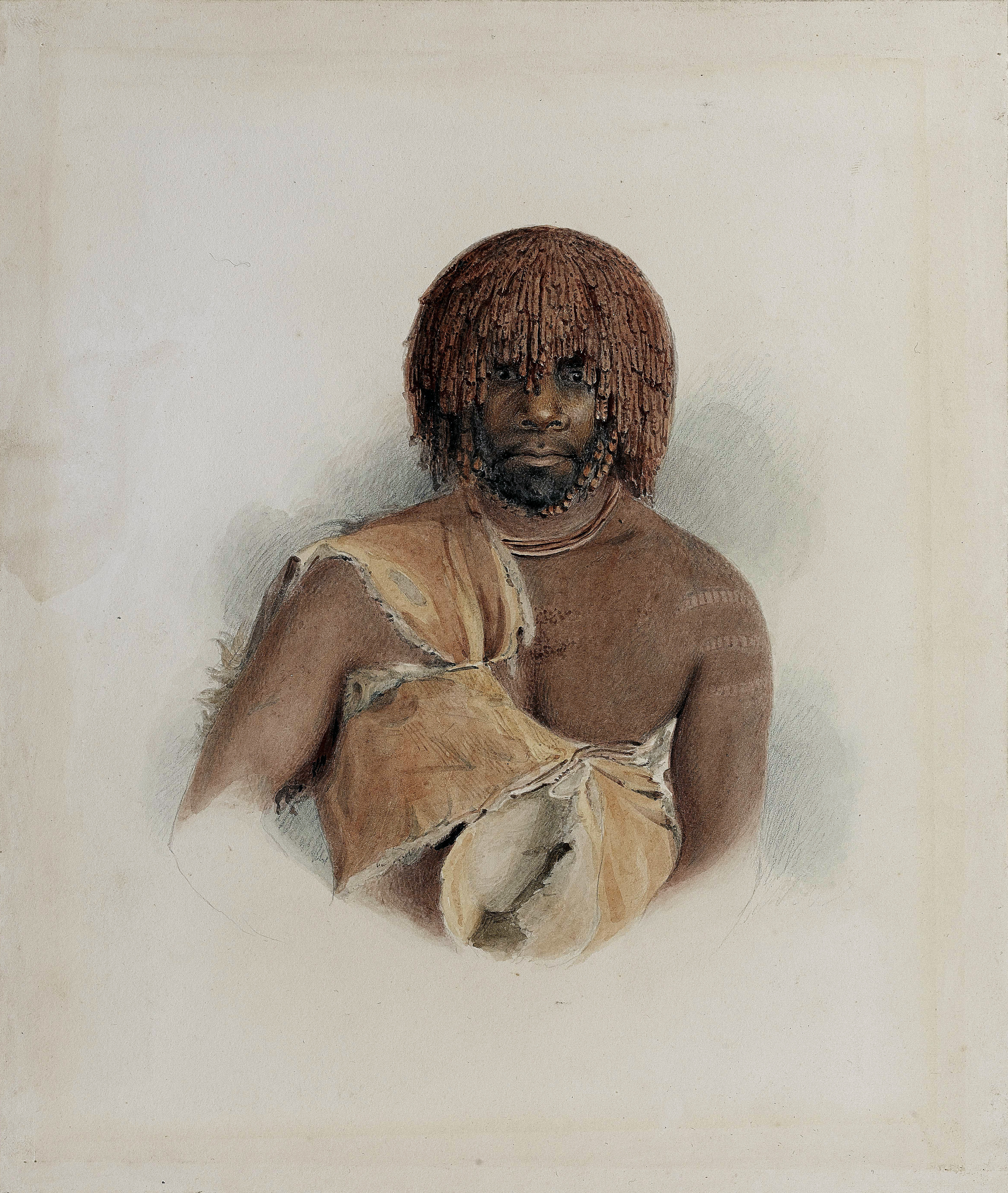
- 1835 painting of Woureddy by Thomas Bock
- Born: c. 1790; Southern Tasmania
- Died: 7 July 1842
- Burial place: Big Green Island, Furneaux Group
- Occupation: Cleverman
- Spouse(s): Unknown (died 1829) Truganini (m. 1829; sep. 1841)
- Children: 3

Woureddy (c. 1790 – 7 July 1842), also known as Wurati, Woorady, Mutteelee, and later as Count Alpha, was a leading warrior and cleverman from the Nuenonne clan of Aboriginal Tasmanians in Australia.

He acted as a guide for George Augustus Robinson in his expeditions to round up the remaining Indigenous people of Tasmania during the early 1830s. Woureddy was a highly significant figure in communicating Indigenous culture to Robinson, and his disclosures remain a prime source of information about pre-colonial Aboriginal Tasmanian customs. He was also the husband of Truganini for a period of around ten years.

His image, and the busts of him and Truganini have over time been utilised and incorporated in conversations about the past in Tasmania. The image by Thomas Bock is utilised in Cassandra Pybus's biography of Truganini.

== Early life ==
Woureddy was born around the year 1790 on Nuenonne country, which included the region around Bruny Island (Lunawanna-alonnah) and Recherche Bay (Lyleatea) in southern Tasmania.

As a young child he remembered observing the French explorers, led by Rear Admiral Bruni D'Entrecasteaux and Captain Jean-Michel Huon de Kermadec arriving in Recherche Bay in 1792. The French came ashore and carved images on a tree which the Nuenonne were terrified of, later destroying the tree thinking it was the work of the evil spirit they called Rageowrapper.

In 1804, Woureddy also witnessed the arrival of the British ships to colonise what is now the Hobart (Nibbaluna) region. He remembered the resultant conflict between the invaders and the resident Mouheneena clan who lived there in a village called Kreewer upon which the suburb of Sandy Bay is now located.

He also recalled British shingle-splitters abducting local Aboriginal women from around the Huon River and shooting the Aboriginal men if they resisted the taking of the females.

As a young man, Woureddy's life was still lived in a mostly traditional way isolated from the influence of the British colonists. He grew his kinky hair into a distinctive mop of dreadlocks styled with red ochre and animal fat. His family were esteemed warriors with his brother a renowned strongman. When his brother was killed in inter-tribal conflict, Woureddy took vengeance by raping and killing his brother's former wife who was implicated in his brother's death.

Woureddy was also considered a cleverman and custodian of his people's culture and beliefs. He excelled in the construction of catamarans, which the Nuenonne and associated clans used to conduct dangerous voyages to offshore islands such as De Witt Island to hunt seals. These vessels were made large enough to fit eight men.

He married and had three sons, the oldest named Myunge born around 1818. The second son was called Droyerloine, born around 1820. The youngest child's traditional name is unknown.

== Association with George Augustus Robinson ==
By the late 1820s, the British had expanded their hold in Van Dieman's Land (as Tasmania was then known), and established several whaling and lumber stations on Bruny Island. Violence, displacement and disease brought by the British had a hugely detrimental effect to the lives of the Nuenonne. In 1828, the Lieutenant-Governor of Van Diemen's Land, Colonel George Arthur, ordered the creation of an Aboriginal ration station on the island, which in 1829 was placed under the authority of an English builder and evangelical Christian named George Augustus Robinson. Robinson also collected a word list of Woureddy's native language.

With the assistance of a local female teenager named Truganini, Robinson initially had some success protecting the Indigenous people at his establishment. But by October 1829, the deaths continued and only a handful of Nuenonne had survived. Woureddy's wife and youngest child died of illness. To strengthen paternal bonds he had with the survivors, Robinson oversaw the partnering of the newly widowed Woureddy with the much younger Truganini.

== The "friendly mission" ==
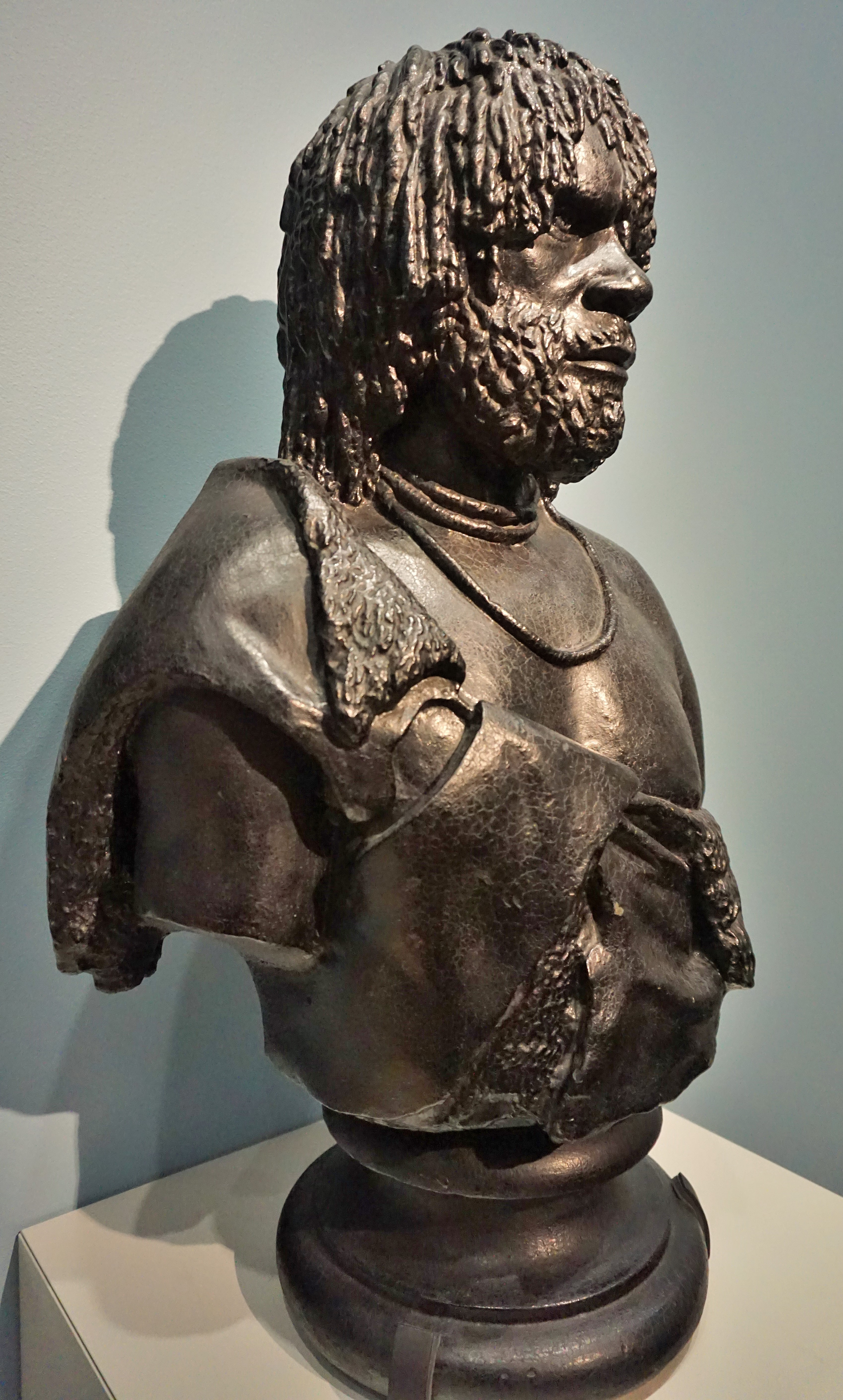
Bronze bust of Woureddy

Realising that the Aboriginal station at Bruny Island was doomed, Robinson formulated a scheme to use Woureddy, Woureddy's two sons, as well as Truganini and a few other captured Aboriginal people such as Kikatapula and Pagerly, to guide him to the clans residing in the uncolonised western parts of Van Diemen's Land. Once contacted, Robinson would "conciliate" these clans to accept the British invasion and avoid conflict. Lieutenant-Governor Arthur approved Robinson's plan and employed him to conduct this venture which was named the "friendly mission".

The mission left Bruny Island in early 1830 with Woureddy playing a very important role as a guide and instructor on local Aboriginal language and culture. He also provided the skills to design and build watercraft for the group to navigate the various rivers they encountered.

Woureddy educated Robinson about the clans of western Van Diemen's Land, whom he regarded with distrust and collectively referred to as the Toogee people. Robinson decided the mission did not need Woureddy's two sons and sent them to Hobart to live at a house he had built there. The mission continued its journey and as it approached the Macquarie Harbour Penal Station, Robinson became lost and was saved from death by being located by Truganini and Woureddy.

The expedition travelled north to Cape Grim, making contact with various tribes and learning about the Cape Grim massacre perpetrated by employees of the Van Diemen's Land Company. They then journeyed east to Launceston where the settler population was preparing for the climax of the Black War. Called the Black Line, it was a 2,200 man strong chain of armed colonists and soldiers gathered to sweep the settled areas looking to kill or trap any Aboriginal people they found. Robinson, Woureddy and the other guides were allowed to continue their mission to the north-east, away from the direction of the Black Line.

They arrived at Cape Portland in October 1830 having rescued several Indigenous women from the slavery of the local sealers, and been joined by the respected warrior Mannalargenna and his small remnant clan. They were informed of the failure of the Black Line to capture or kill many Aboriginal people and it was decided by the government to use the nearby Bass Strait Islands as a place of enforced exile for those Indigenous Tasmanians collected by Robinson.

Robinson's first chose Swan Island as the place of exile. This small island was exposed to powerful gales, had poor water supply and was infested with tiger snakes. Robinson took Woureddy and a few other guides off this island to accompany him to Hobart where he had a meeting with the Lieutenant-Governor in early 1831. For his "friendly mission" work, Robinson was rewarded with land grants and hundreds of pounds worth of pay increases. Woureddy was promised a boat, but this was never given to him.

Woureddy, though, did get to see his two sons who had been living at Robinson's house in Hobart. Myunge had been renamed as Davey Bruny, and Droyerloine had been renamed Peter Bruny. However, when Woureddy left Hobart with Robinson, his two sons were sent to the orphan school in the town and Woureddy did not see them again until four years later.

== Guide for Robinson on further expeditions ==
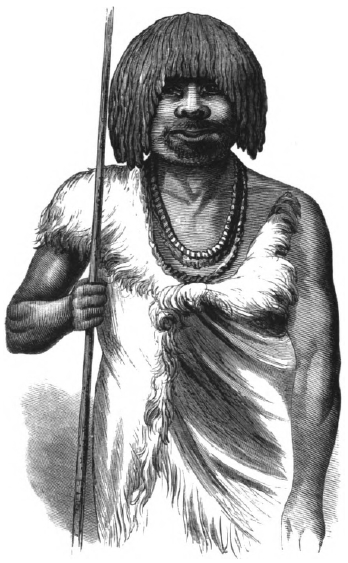
Drawing of Woureddy

While in Hobart, Robinson successfully negotiated a contract with the colonial authorities for him to lead further expeditions to capture all the remaining Aboriginal Tasmanians and transfer them to confinement in Bass Strait. Woureddy, his wife Truganini and several other Aboriginal Tasmanians were chosen by Robinson as guides for these expeditions.

The island of exile was changed from Swan Island, firstly to Gun Carriage Island and then to the Wybalenna Aboriginal Establishment on Flinders Island as the number of Aborigines captured by Robinson increased.

In 1831, they captured respected leader Eumarrah and his small clan near the locality of Pipers Brook. They then continued on, looking to take captive the remaining members of the Oyster Bay and Big River tribes who had condensed into a single group taking refuge in the Central Highlands. Woureddy and the other Indigenous guides frustrated Robinson by seeming to alert this group of their approach and it wasn't until December that they were seized. This group which included the once-feared warriors Tongerlongeter and Montpelliatta, were paraded in Hobart before being transported into exile.

In the years 1832, 1833 and 1834, Robinson conducted several expeditions to capture the remaining Indigenous people of the west coast of Tasmania. Robinson captured almost all the remaining Indigenous people of this region, including the clans led by prominent men such as Towterer and Wyne. He did this mostly by use of force and deceit. Many of the captives, including pregnant woman, old people and children, died in miserable conditions when they were held at the Macquarie Harbour Penal Station while awaiting transportation to Flinders Island.

== Woureddy exiled to Wybalenna ==
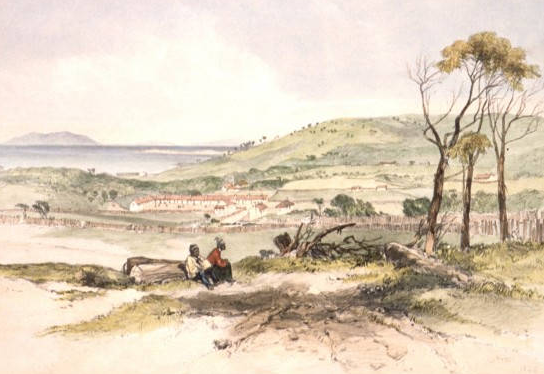
Wybalenna Aboriginal Establishment

With the completion of the removal of Aborigines from mainland Tasmania in 1835, Robinson brought his Indigenous guides to his house in Hobart for a few months of respite. During this period Truganini and Woureddy became celebrities and had their portraits painted by Thomas Bock and the sculptor Benjamin Law also created casts and busts of their profiles. However, in September 1835, they too were taken into exile at the Wybalenna Aboriginal Establishment with the other Indigenous Tasmanians including Woureddy's sons, Myunge and Droyerloine.

Robinson became the superintendent at Wybalenna and began a program of Christianising the inmates. He changed their names, made them wear European clothes and attempted to prohibit their practising of Aboriginal culture and language. Illness and mortality rates were high. Although Woureddy's name was changed to Count Alpha, he remained otherwise resistant to the enforced changes, defiantly keeping his cultural practices.

== Port Phillip District ==
In 1839, Robinson accepted the position of Protector of Aborigines in the newly colonised Port Phillip District in present-day Victoria. Robinson quit his role as manager of Wybalenna and took Woureddy, Truganini, Myunge, Droyerloine and thirteen other Aboriginal Tasmanians with him as servants. However, once in Melbourne, Robinson was soon not able to keep such a large number of assistants and Woureddy and his sons had to survive by becoming farmhands for local colonists.

In 1841, Truganini abandoned Woureddy, and ran off with Maulboyheenner, a young Tasmanian Aboriginal man who had also come from Wybalenna. These two formed a gang with another Tasmanian man named Tunnerminnerwait and two women called Plorenernoopner and Maytepueminer, and decided to head to Westernport Bay to take revenge on a local colonist named William Watson, who they believed shot dead Maytepueminer's husband Lacklay. Two sailors were mistakenly shot dead by this group and as a result, the five Aboriginal Tasmanians became outlaws. They were later captured and at a trial in Melbourne, the three women including Truganini were exonerated, but Maulboyheenner and Tunnerminnerwait were found guilty of murder and were publicly hanged on 20 January 1842 in what was the first legal execution conducted in Melbourne.

The remaining Aboriginal Tasmanians in the Port Phillip District, including Woureddy, were rounded up and sent back to Wybalenna on Flinders Island.

== Death and legacy ==
Woureddy died on 7 July 1842 while aboard the ship that was transporting him to Flinders Island. He was buried with little ceremony on Big Green Island.

His younger son, Droyerloine, managed to avoid being returned to Flinders Island but died in the Port Phillip District in 1843.

His older son, Myunge, survived at Wybalenna and became a leader in Aboriginal self-determination, helping organise a petition to Queen Victoria to improve conditions at the establishment. Myunge married Maytepueminer and both were amongst the survivors who were transferred to the Oyster Cove Aboriginal internment camp in 1847. Myunge died there one year later.

Woureddy Bay and Woureddy Creek in Bathurst Harbour in south-west Tasmania are named after him.

=== Indigenous creation stories ===
Woureddy's interactions with George Augustus Robinson resulted in the translation and documentation of important Indigenous Tasmanian beliefs that would have otherwise been lost. Although these beliefs are from the Nuenonne people, they closely resembled those of other clans from across Tasmania.

==== Dromerdeena and Moinee ====
Of these is the story of Dromerdeena and Moinee. Dromerdeena (who is the celestial being known to the Western world as Canopus) fought with another powerful sky spirit named Moinee. Moinee was defeated and tumbled down to earth followed by his wife. Their embryonic children fell as rain to be taken up in the womb of Moinee's wife who became the ocean. Moinee fought off the evil spirits known as the Rageowrapper who dwelt on earth.

Moinee then, in conjunction with the ant spirit named Laller, created animals and humans from the earth. He created humans initially with a tail and no knee joints. Dromerdeena saw how uncomfortable the humans were and took pity on them, taking away their tails and making knee joints for them so that they could sit. The humans were thankful to Dromerdeena for this. Dromerdeena's foot is Mars and his pathway is the Milky Way. His brothers are Beegera (Sirius) and Pimeerna (Betelgeuse). After his efforts of creation, Moinee was turned into a monolith of stone and dwells at Cox Bight.

==== The moon and the sun ====
Another creation belief related by Woureddy is the story of the sun and the moon. The moon, known as Vetea, was a woman who came from Moo-ai, the land of the spirits. Kangaroo and abalone asked her to stop at earth and she came down to cook some food on a fire. Her husband the sun, known as Parnuen, came and swept her into the fire where she was burnt on her side. The injured Vetea rolled into the sea and then went into the sky to join her husband. Where she was burnt can still be seen as the blackness on her side during the phases of the moon. The children of the sun and moon are the rainbows.

== See also ==
- List of Indigenous Australian historical figures
