= Eumarrah =

Indigenous Tasmanian leader

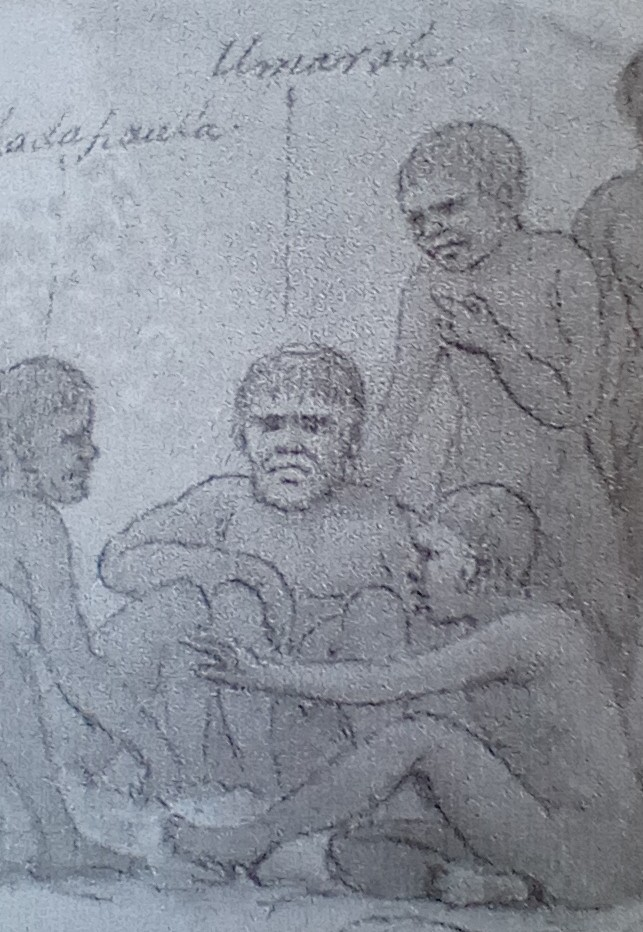
- Detail of an 1832 sketch by John Glover showing Eumarrah
- Born: c. 1798
- Died: 24 March 1832; Launceston
- Other names: Umarrah, Kahnneherlargenner, Multiyalakina
- Spouse(s): Laoninneloonner; Woolaytoopinneyer

Eumarrah (c.1798 – 24 March 1832) was an Aboriginal Tasmanian leader. He was active in resisting British colonisation during the 1820s and early 1830s, but was ultimately captured and used as a guide in operations tracking down and removing other Indigenous people.

== Early life ==
Eumarrah was born around the year 1798 in the Midlands of Tasmania probably somewhere near the future Campbell Town. He was born into the Tyerrernotepanner or Stoney Creek tribe.

He was known by the names Kahnneherlargenner and Multiyalakina (Moleteheerlaggenner), but later acquired the name of Eumarrah or Umarrah apparently after being a labourer for the colonist Hugh Murray, Eumarrah being a derivative of Murray.

== Conflict with the British and capture ==
As the British expanded into his homeland during the 1820s, Eumarrah led the Tyerrernotepanner in raids to counteract the murdering and displacing of his people. Eumarrah himself later explained that some colonists were killed in these raids because his tribe were driven from their hunting grounds and it was his patriotic duty to fight back.

In 1828, Governor George Arthur organised 'roving parties' of armed militia to go into the Tasmanian countryside to track down and capture or destroy Indigenous rebels such as Eumarrah. In November of that year, a 'roving party' led by Gilbert Robertson and guided by a captured Indigenous resistance leader named Kikatapula, tracked Eumarrah down near Tooms Lake. With the aid of the soldiers attached to the party, they seized Eumarrah, his wife Laoninneloonner and several other of his followers. He was subsequently incarcerated in Richmond Gaol as a prisoner of war.

== 'Roving party' guide ==
Eumarrah remained in prison until August 1829 when he was coerced into becoming a guide for another 'roving party'. Eumarrah ensured that the 'roving parties' he led did not locate any Indigenous people. By the end of 1829, it was regarded that Eumarrah was deliberately misdirecting the parties and he was taken out from the role and placed back in prison.

== Guide for the 'friendly mission' ==
In early 1830, with the help of Kikatapula, Eumarrah became part of the expedition led by George Augustus Robinson to make amicable contact with the Indigenous people of the remote regions of western Tasmanian. This expedition was named the 'Friendly Mission' and included several other Indigenous Tasmanian guides such as Truganini, Kikatapula and Woorady.

In May 1830, when the expedition was near Trial Harbour, Eumarrah absconded from the 'Friendly Mission', citing that he was threatened with violence from one of the British members of the group.

== Advisor to Governor Arthur during 'Black Line' operations ==
Eumarrah, with his superior bushcraft skills, made his way through the wilderness of western Tasmania back to his homeland area near the Tamar River, but was soon back in British hands. Governor Arthur met with him and placed Eumarrah in the role of his personal advisor and guide for the 'Black Line' operation. This operation involved a line of thousands colonists many kilometres long scouring the settled areas for the remaining Indigenous people. Eumarrah remained in the role for three weeks from late October 1830, but apparently when he found out that his kinspeople were trapped behind the 'Black Line', he absconded. He avoided being trapped himself by heading northeast and again returned to his homelands.

== Rejoins the 'friendly mission' ==
In August 1831, Eumarrah and five other Stoney Creek people were found by G.A. Robinson's group and they agreed to rejoin with his 'friendly mission'. By this stage, the 'friendly mission' had evolved into a series of expeditions to round-up the remaining Indigenous people of Van Diemen's Land and transport them to Flinders Island in order to ethnically cleanse the colony of its original occupants.

Although Eumarrah agreed to join with Robinson again, he did not want to go to Flinders Island. He also did not want to go to Launceston, as he had been involved in the killings of several settlers near there since he left the Black Line operation. Instead, he once again became a guide for Robinson's expedition, helping track down the remaining Big River-Oyster Bay people.

In late December, Robinson with the aid of Eumarrah, Mannalargenna, Kikatapula and others, tracked down the remaining sixteen Big River-Oyster Bay which included the resistance leaders Tongerlongeter and Montpelliatta. They surrendered to Robinson's group, after which they all then travelled to Hobart. After a brief reception, these Indigenous Tasmanians including Robinson's guides, some of whom were the last to have continued living a traditional lifestyle, were shipped off in early 1832 to Flinders Island to live in imposed exile.

== Death ==
On a later expedition as a guide for Robinson, Eumarrah became ill and was hospitalised in Launceston. He died on 24 March 1832. He was buried in St John's graveyard without funeral rites.

A watercolour drawing of what was thought to be Eumarrah by Thomas Bock in the collection of the British Museum is now regarded as being that of Kikatapula.

== See also ==
- List of Indigenous Australian historical figures
