= Truganini =

Aboriginal Tasmanian woman (c. 1812–1876)

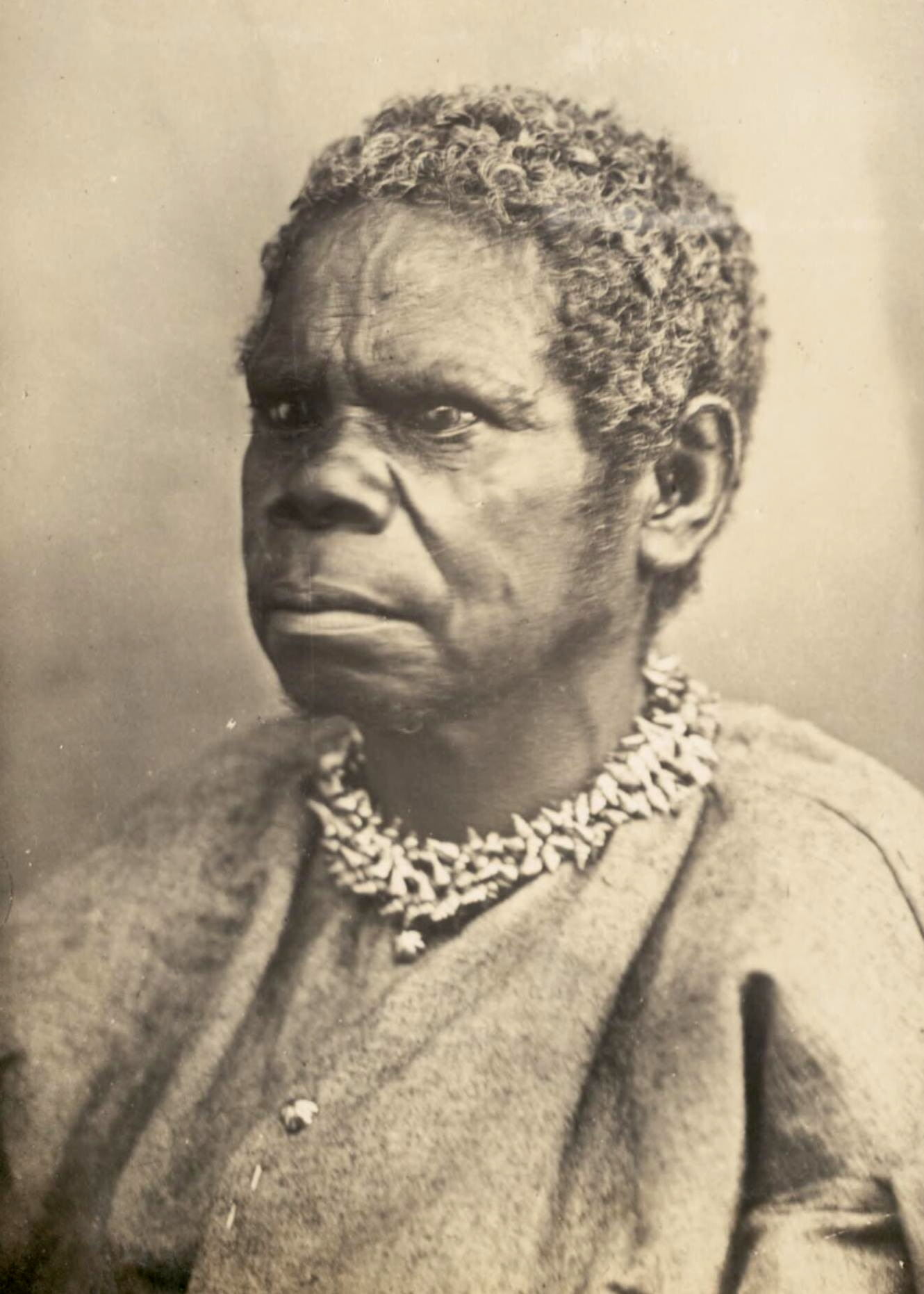
- Truganini, c. 1866
- Born: c. 1812; Recherche Bay, Van Diemen's Land, Colony of New South Wales
- Died: 8 May 1876 (aged about 64); Hobart, Colony of Tasmania
- Partner: William Lanne (1864–1869)

Truganini (/ˌtruːɡəˈnɪniː/ TROO-gə-NIN-ee; c. 1812 – 8 May 1876) was an Aboriginal Tasmanian woman who was widely, though incorrectly, described as the last surviving Aboriginal Tasmanian. A member of the Nuenonne people, she grew up on Bruny Island in what is now south-eastern Tasmania. During her teenage years, she saw the death and displacement of much of Tasmania's Aboriginal population as a result of British colonisation during the Black War. She became a guide to the colonial official George Augustus Robinson and accompanied him on a series of expeditions that resulted in the exile of Tasmania's remaining Aboriginal population.

Truganini was exiled to the Wybalenna Aboriginal Establishment on Flinders Island at the conclusion of the expeditions in 1835. She later spent time in the Port Phillip District (modern-day Victoria), where she became a fugitive and was tried alongside four others for the murder of a pair of whalers. After being acquitted of the crime, she was returned to Wybalenna and was later moved to Oyster Cove. By 1872, she was the only Aboriginal resident left at Oyster Cove and began to be mythologised as the last of her race, attracting the fascination of colonial scientists and the settler population.

After Truganini's death in 1876, the colonial Tasmanian government declared the island's Aboriginal population extinct. Truganini became a symbol of her people's supposed extinction and has featured prominently in art, music, and literature. The narrative that Truganini was the last Aboriginal Tasmanian has been rejected by scholars and by the contemporary Aboriginal Tasmanian community. Once cast as the final survivor of a race doomed to extinction, she has since been reframed by some as a memorial to the genocide of Indigenous Australians, and claimed by others as an anti-colonial resistance figure.

== Early life and people ==
Truganini was born around 1812 at Recherche Bay in southern Tasmania (then known as Van Diemen's Land). She was the youngest daughter of Manganerer, the senior man of the Nuenonne clan. Nuenonne country included Bruny Island and the coastal area of the Tasmanian mainland between Recherche Bay and Oyster Cove. Truganini's mother, with whom Manganerer had at least three daughters, was likely a member of the Ninene people, a clan whose country encompassed the area surrounding Port Davey.

By the time Truganini was born, the Nuenonne population had begun to encounter British colonisation. James Cook first landed on Bruny Island at Adventure Bay in 1777. Within a few decades, former convicts who had been transported to Australia began to conduct raids on Aboriginal communities to kidnap women. When a group of French explorers and scientists visited Bruny Island in 1802, the Nuenonne they encountered were terrified of their guns, and the women refused to approach them. After the establishment of the city of Hobart in 1804, a large number of ships began to sail past Nuenonne country to access the Derwent River. At the beginning of the 19th century, the Aboriginal population of Tasmania numbered around 3000–8000, forming nine nations divided into around 50–100 clan groups. In 1819, the Aboriginal and settler populations of Tasmania were both around 5000, with the latter overwhelmingly male; by 1830, the settler population had grown to 23,500.

== Life at Missionary Bay ==
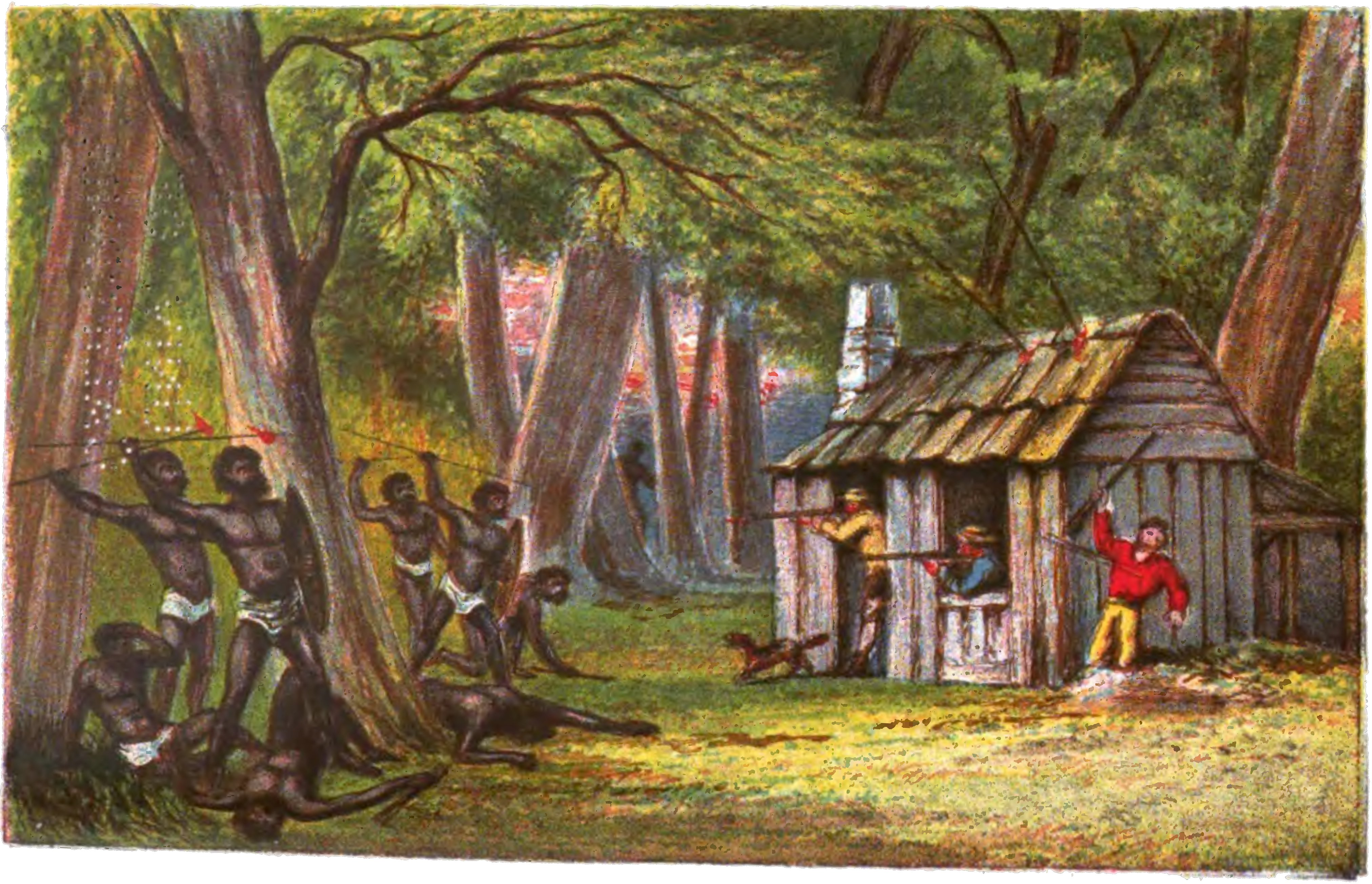
Violence between British settlers and Aboriginal Tasmanians during the Black War

After the arrival of British settlers, the seal colonies that the Nuenonne relied on were soon destroyed. Many Nuenonne women were forced to trade sex for food with the settlers who had established whaling stations on the island. In 1816, Truganini's mother was murdered by a group of sailors, and in 1826 two of her sisters were kidnapped by a sealer. After the death of Truganini's mother, Manganerer married another woman and had at least one son. According to an unverified account published shortly before Truganini's death by the surveyor James Erskine Calder, around 1828 Truganini was abducted and raped by timber cutters. According to Calder's account, the timber cutters murdered two Nuenonne men, one of whom was her fiancé Paraweena, by throwing them out of a boat and cutting off their hands as they tried to clamber back in.

By the late 1820s, Tasmania was in the midst of a conflict between colonists and Aboriginal Tasmanians known as the Black War. The kidnapping of Aboriginal women was common, and retributive violence by displaced Aboriginal Tasmanians was prevalent. In 1828, the colony's governor George Arthur set up military posts to divide the settled districts, from which Aboriginal Tasmanians were to be excluded, from the rest of the island. In November of that year, driven by fear of Aboriginal guerrilla violence amongst the settler population, he declared martial law within the settled districts. The order did not extend to Bruny Island, where the less hostile relationship between the two populations was seen as making the island a suitable site for an attempt at conciliation with the Indigenous population. Arthur appointed George Augustus Robinson to set up a ration station for the Aboriginal population and oversee the colonists' relationship with the Aboriginal communities on Bruny Island. Robinson, who had migrated from London to Tasmania in 1824 to work as a builder, was a devout Christian who expressed religious and humanitarian motivations. He wrote that he hoped his efforts—modelled on the resettlement of Native Americans in the United States—would save the Aboriginal Tasmanian population from extinction.

Robinson encountered Truganini in April 1829 while she was living amongst a group of convict woodcutters on the Tasmanian mainland. He brought her back to Bruny Island, where he established a Christian mission at Missionary Bay. He used Truganini's presence at the mission to entice her father and a small group of other Aboriginal people to join her. Robinson deplored the widespread trade in sex between Aboriginal women and settlers, and attempted to convert the mission's residents to Christianity and put them to work in exchange for extra rations. The mission quickly became stricken by disease, prompting its residents to seek to leave. Truganini eventually deserted the mission to live at the whaling station at Adventure Bay, running away from Robinson when he attempted to retrieve her that August. After the Nuenonne elder Woureddy—who Robinson viewed as an important ally—expressed a desire to marry Truganini, Robinson retrieved her from the whaling station. Despite initially expressing firm resistance, Truganini reluctantly agreed to marry Woureddy, and they were married in October 1829.

In 1829, a group of escaped convicts kidnapped Truganini's stepmother; Manganerer attempted to follow them in a canoe but was blown out to sea. By the time his canoe was spotted by a passing vessel, Manganerer's son had died and he himself was suffering from severe dehydration. When he returned to Missionary Bay, he found that almost the entirety of his clan group had died from disease. By early 1830, Manganerer had died from a sexually transmitted disease.

== Guide for the "friendly mission" ==
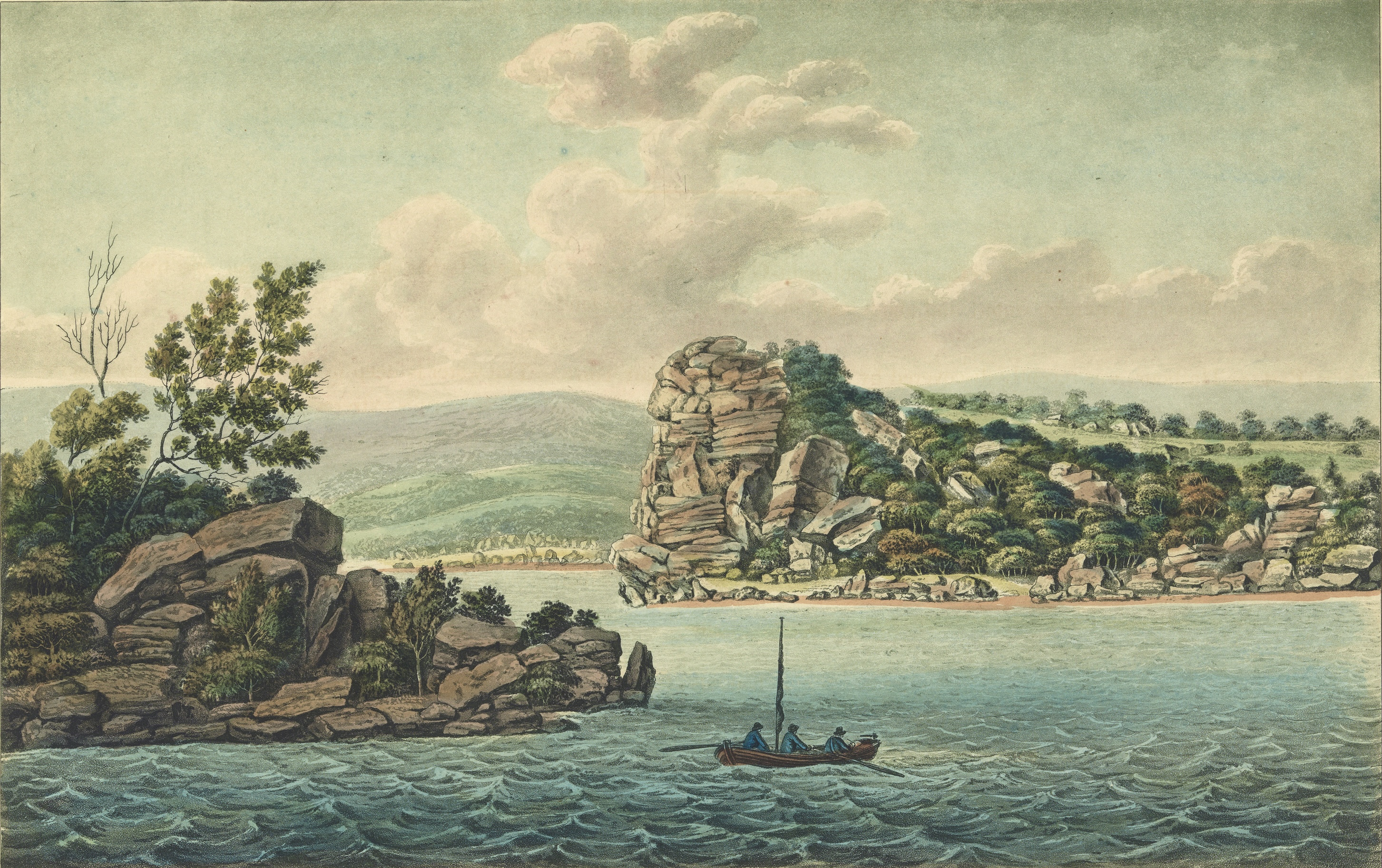
1824 illustration of Ram Head Point near Bathurst Harbour

In January 1830, Robinson obtained the governor's approval for what he termed a "friendly mission" to contact and gain the trust of the Aboriginal peoples of western and north-western Tasmania. He brought a group of Aboriginal guides, including Truganini, Woureddy, two men named Kikatapula and Maulboyheenner, and a woman named Pagerly, along with a handful of convicts. The party set out on foot from Recherche Bay on 3 February 1830. Robinson's series of expeditions, which would ultimately continue until 1834, have been described by the genocide scholar Tom Lawson as a "roving embassy" that eventually negotiated an end to the violent conflict between the settlers and the Aboriginal population.

Truganini, who was suffering from an advanced case of syphilis, collected food for the expedition party by diving for shellfish and gathering edible plants. She also entered into a sexual relationship with Robinson's convict foreman Alexander McKay. The group encountered a group of ten Ninine families shortly after passing Bathurst Harbour, and on 25 March 1830 they met another group and performed corroborees with them. During their journey, they learned of the increasingly violent massacres of Aboriginal Tasmanians taking place as part of the Black War. About 60 settlers and 300 Aboriginal Tasmanians had been killed over the preceding two years. They finished their journey in Launceston in October 1830, with Truganini so weakened that she could barely walk. With the colony under martial law, Truganini and the other Aboriginal guides were set to be imprisoned until an official secured their freedom and allowed Robinson's party to stay at his home.

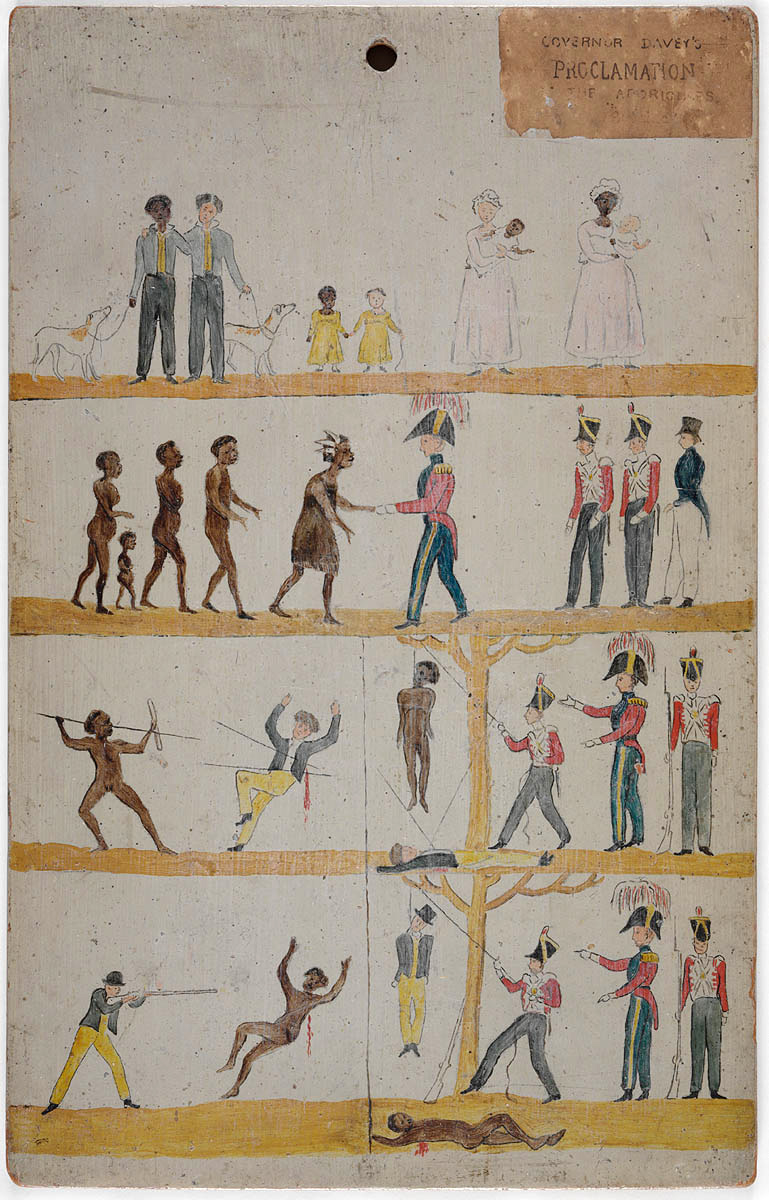
Governor Davey's Proclamation, a pictogram produced to explain martial law and promote conciliation

By the time of their arrival in Launceston, the governor had announced a policy known as the "Black Line" that required every able-bodied male settler in Tasmania to join a militia. This militia would form two lines that would trap and remove every Aboriginal inhabitant of the settled districts. Robinson reached an agreement with the governor that his expedition party would attempt to locate and make peace with any Aboriginal groups who evaded the Black Line, and would resettle them on Swan Island until a more permanent resettlement site could be established. Robinson quickly set out with Truganini, Woureddy, an Aboriginal boy named Peevay, and two other guides to negotiate these groups' surrender before they could become victims of the Black Line. Their party persuaded some sealers to release Aboriginal women that they had enslaved, and convinced some Aboriginal groups, including one led by the warrior Mannalargenna, to accompany them to Swan Island after warning them of the approaching danger.

Robinson brought the assembled party, including Truganini and the other guides, to the inhospitable Swan Island. The island was exposed to powerful gales, had little food or clean water, and was infested with tiger snakes. After securing his captives on the island, Robinson received a letter of praise from the military commandant based in Launceston. While the 2200 militiamen of the Black Line had captured just two Aboriginal people at a cost of more than £30,000 (equivalent to $3,000,000 in 2025), his small party had secured 15. After gathering some more women who had been captured by sealers, Robinson took Truganini and a few of his other Aboriginal guides to Hobart, where he met with the governor in early 1831. Robinson was rewarded with land grants and hundreds of pounds for the mission's success, while Truganini and the other guides were gifted some clothing and a boat. Despite persistently asking Robinson about their boat, the Aboriginal guides never saw or used it; Robinson instead rented it out and kept the proceeds in an account he controlled.

== Further expeditions ==
While the colony's governing Executive Council encouraged Robinson to immediately set out on another mission to round up the remaining Aboriginal population, Robinson persuaded the governor and the Aboriginal Committee (which had been established to manage the Aboriginal population) that a permanent resettlement site should first be established for the surviving Aboriginal Tasmanians on Gun Carriage Island. By 1831, the total number of Aboriginal Tasmanians had been reduced to a few hundred survivors. On 1 March, Robinson gathered Truganini, the other guides, and 17 Aboriginal people who he had gathered from the city's jail, hospital, and from settlers' homes. He took them from Hobart to Swan Island, where he collected the 51 people who had been left on the island after his last expedition. From there they continued towards the new resettlement colony. Despite complaints from Truganini and the other guides that they did not want to be resettled to Gun Carriage Island, Robinson expelled the sealers who had established a village there and turned the island into a resettlement station, giving Truganini and Woureddy one of the sealers' cottages. Truganini refused to enter her cottage and begged Robinson to let her return to the mainland.

=== 1831 ===
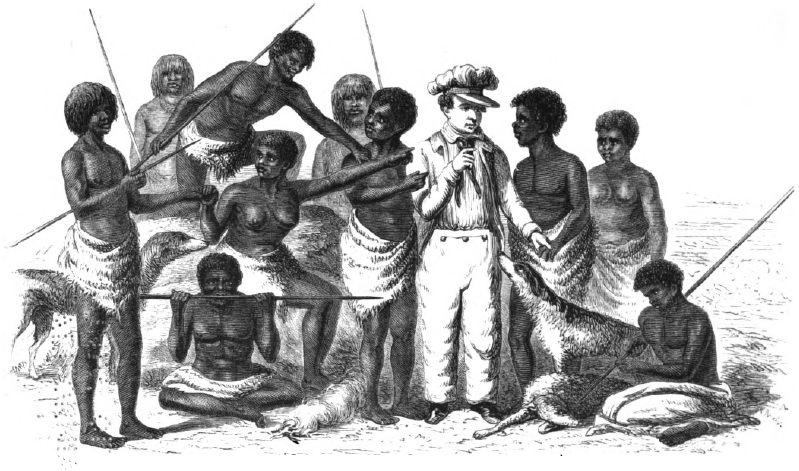
George Augustus Robinson on his conciliation mission

In May 1831 Robinson took Truganini, Woureddy, Pagerly, Kikatapula, and Maulboyheenner to a mission that was being established at Musselroe Bay. In late June, the guides set out with Robinson on another expedition to capture a group of Aboriginal people led by Eumarrah. Robinson was informed that the governor had decided to disestablish the settlement at Gun Carriage Island and had appointed him superintendent of a new Aboriginal resettlement station on Flinders Island, located about 65 kilometres to the north-west of the Tasmanian mainland. After a few months of little success in locating Eumarrah, Robinson sought assistance from Eumarrah's rival Mannalargenna. Mannalargenna was furious with Robinson for breaking his earlier promises by exiling him to Gun Carriage Island, but eventually agreed to assist him in tracking down Eumarrah.

In mid-August Truganini separated from the rest of the group to care for Woureddy, who had suffered an injury to his thigh. By the time they reunited with the rest of the party on 31 August, the group had located Eumarrah and had been joined by two more Aboriginal women, including Mannalargenna's daughter Woretemoeteryenner. Eumarrah offered to work with Mannalargenna to help Robinson track down the Big River people, who remained at large and had continued to engage in violent conflict with settlers. The group returned to Launceston in September 1831, where newspapers reported with excitement on Eumarrah's promises to locate and round up the Big River people. On 15 October Truganini, Robinson, and the other Aboriginal guides set out on this new expedition. The group was forced to exercise caution as they traversed some of the colony's most settled regions, with Robinson believing that many of the settlers would kill his guides if given the opportunity. On 30 December they located a group of 16 men, 9 women, and 1 child, who were sent to join the 66 residents of the new resettlement station on Flinders Island.

=== 1832 and 1833 ===
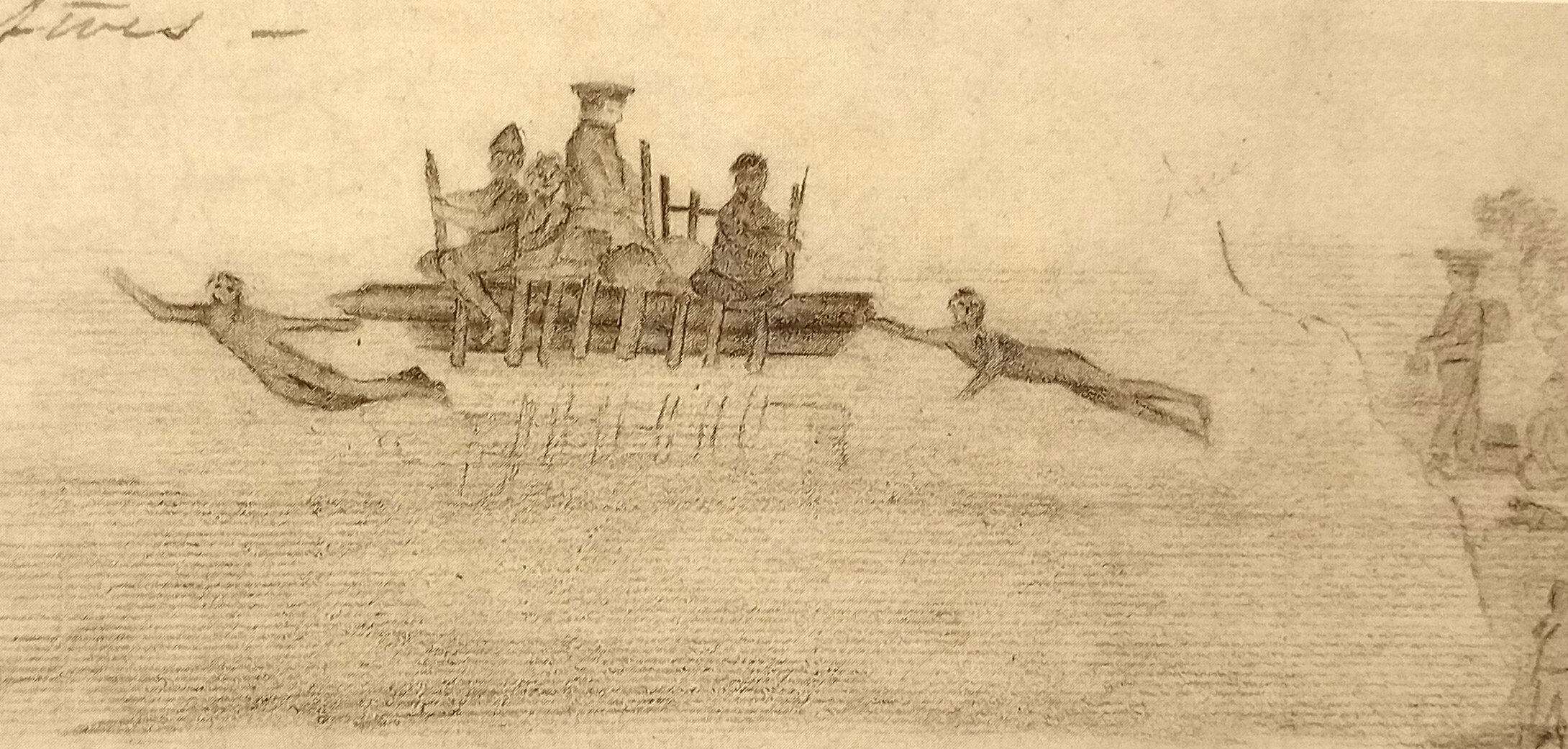
Sketch of Truganini swimming a raft across the Arthur River from the diaries of George Augustus Robinson

Truganini was briefly taken to Flinders Island in February 1832, but departed with Robinson a few weeks later to round up a group of Aboriginal people known to be living in north-western Tasmania. Their short time on Flinders Island had left almost all of the Aboriginal guides in Robinson's party suffering from disease, with Eumarrah and Kikatapula eventually dying from influenza. The party arrived at Cape Grim in early June and soon encountered a group of 23 Aboriginal people from the Peerapper clan. They were lured onto Hunter Island, where many died from illness before they could be sent to Flinders Island.

In August Truganini and the rest of the party set out in search of two more clan groups believed to be living in western Tasmania. The following month, Truganini saved Robinson's life by swimming him across the Arthur River away from a group of Aboriginal warriors who intended to kill him. By November, Truganini was assisting an expedition led by the farmer Anthony Cottrell to locate the Tarkiner clan group while Robinson travelled to Hobart. They gathered six individuals and sent them to Launceston, then reunited with Robinson at Macquarie Harbour Penal Station on Sarah Island. In February 1833 Truganini set out on her own to hunt for a group of Ninine people and persuaded the eight of them to accompany her to Sarah Island.

Robinson rejoined the party in late April, by which point several of the Ninine had escaped. Increasingly impatient to take up his post on Flinders Island, Robinson became more willing to use force to collect the three remaining clan groups believed to be living on the mainland. In May Truganini led the party on another expedition and located a group of about 10 Ninine people, including the young daughter of the leader Towterer. The group asked that they be permitted to reunite with Towterer and the remainder of their clan group, who were camped a short distance away. Woureddy persuaded Robinson that the Ninine could not be trusted and that they should instead force the group onto Sarah Island at gunpoint. The following month, shortly after this first group of Ninine had been sent away, the party located Towterer and the remainder of the Ninine clan.

In July the party set out on another expedition to locate the remaining Tarkiner. Truganini helped to push the party's rafts across rivers, and at one point suffered a seizure from the ordeal. While the expedition party eventually located most of the Tarkiner, all of their adults quickly died after being brought to Sarah Island. Only a handful of the Ninine and Tarkiner captives were still alive when they were sent to Flinders Island on 20 November.

=== 1834 ===
On 14 January 1834, Robinson and his party left Launceston on what was intended to be their final expedition. By April, they had located 20 more Aboriginal people. While Robinson was crossing the Arthur River on the return journey, Truganini again saved his life by swimming out to his raft and towing it to the bank after it was carried away by the swift current. Robinson left the expedition soon after and returned to Hobart, but placed his son George in command of the expedition party and tasked him with finding the Tommigener clan. After enduring cold weather for four months, they found the eight remaining Tommigener in December, all of whom were already suffering from disease.

== Wybalenna and final expedition ==
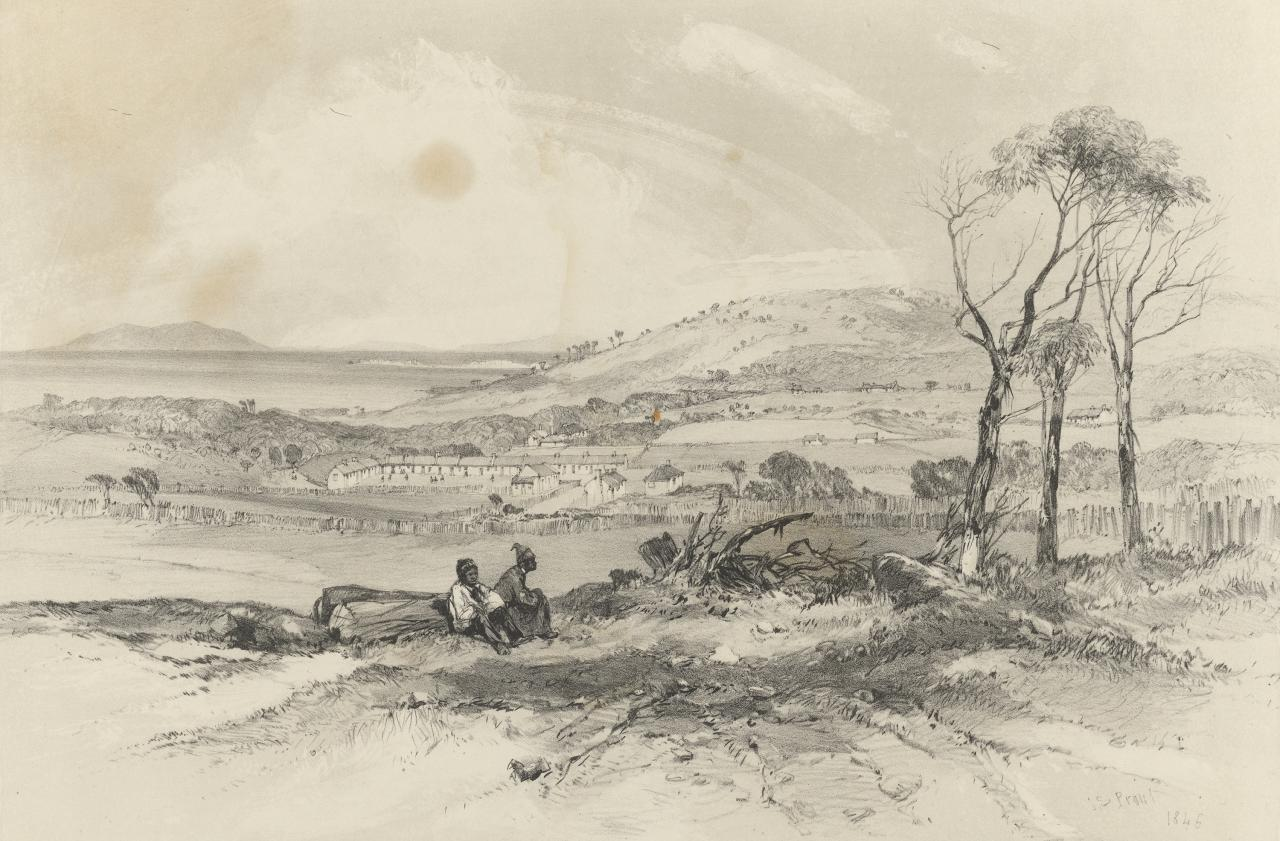
1846 illustration of the Wybalenna Aboriginal Establishment

On 3 February 1835, Robinson declared that he had successfully located and exiled the entire Aboriginal population of the Tasmanian mainland. (Note: Robinson was unaware that at least one Tarkiner group, the Lannes, remained on the mainland. They would not be located until 1842.) The announcement was widely reported and was met with excitement by the settler population. He was awarded a sum of money, land grants for his sons, and a lifelong pension. Robinson brought Truganini and the other Indigenous guides to his home in Hobart to recover from the long series of expeditions. Truganini and Woureddy had become celebrities in the colony, with the latter widely referred to as "Your Majesty", and they became the subjects of drawings by Thomas Bock and busts by the sculptor Benjamin Law. In October 1835, however, they too were taken into exile at the Wybalenna Aboriginal Establishment on Flinders Island.

Robinson expected to soon be transferred to the newly established Colony of South Australia and planned to bring the exiled Aboriginal Tasmanian population with him. He therefore regarded Flinders Island as a temporary resettlement site. The conditions at Wybalenna were poor; of the 300 Aboriginal Tasmanians who had surrendered to Robinson since 1830, just 112 were alive at Wybalenna in 1835. Many were suffering from disease, and there was little food or fresh water available on the island. Robinson attempted to convert the residents to Christianity, changing their names and forcing them to wear European clothes. He renamed Truganini "Lalla Rookh" in reference to the romance of the same name by the Irish poet Thomas Moore. Truganini was forced to engage in sewing classes, but grew unhappy and expressed her desire to leave the island.

In March 1836 Truganini joined another expedition to north-western Tasmania to locate the final group of Tarkiner people. This 16-month expedition provided an escape from Wybalenna and allowed the guides to return to the lifestyles to which they were accustomed. When the group returned to Wybalenna, 16 of its inhabitants had died in their absence, and Truganini and the other guides had grown colder towards Robinson. When Robinson told them that he had constructed new houses on the island, Truganini remarked that soon there would be no one left alive to inhabit them. Between 1835 and 1839, about half of the Aboriginal residents of Wybalenna died, with the majority of deaths caused by pneumonia.

== Port Phillip District and trial ==
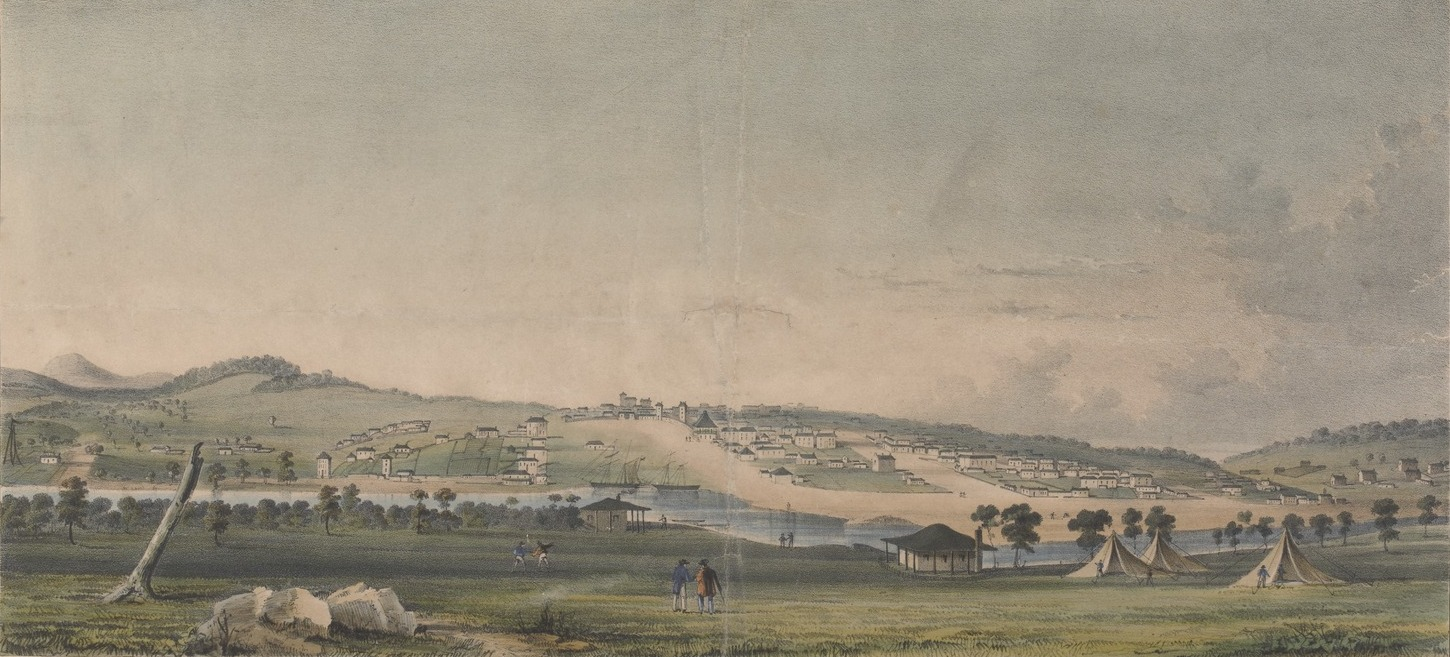
1841 engraving of the Port Phillip District

In 1839, Robinson took up the position of Protector of Aborigines in the newly colonised Port Phillip District in present-day Victoria. He took Truganini and about fifteen other Aboriginal Tasmanians with him; only six would eventually return to Tasmania. Truganini and the other Tasmanians had few cultural ties to the Kulin people of the Port Phillip District, with whom they did not share a language. Robinson allowed the Tasmanians to live largely independently and eventually tasked one of his assistants, William Thomas, with caring for them. The Aboriginal men spent their time hunting and performing labour for Robinson's sons, while the women were left with little to do; Truganini attempted to relieve the boredom by weaving baskets.

Truganini ran away from the Aboriginal encampment several times. By 1840, Robinson had decided he no longer had any use for the Tasmanians, and requested that arrangements be made to send them back to Wybalenna. In 1841, while arrangements were still being made for their return to Tasmania, Truganini abandoned her husband Woureddy and ran away with Maulboyheenner. They were soon joined by Peevay and two other Tasmanian women called Plorenernoopner and Maytepueminer, and the five of them set out for Westernport Bay to search for Maytepueminer's husband Lacklay. On 2 October they plundered and set fire to the hut of a settler named William Watson and kidnapped his wife and daughter. When Watson returned with his son-in-law, they were shot and wounded by the Tasmanians. Late that evening, Watson and his son-in-law reached a nearby station and found that their wives had been left there uninjured. While being pursued by an armed search party assembled by Watson, Maulboyheenner and Peevay shot and beat to death two whalers they had mistaken for members of Watson's party.

Truganini and her four companions became outlaws, triggering a pursuit by the authorities across the Bass River and Tooradin regions. The group raided huts along the way and stole food, money, and weapons. Truganini became weakened by swelling in her legs, and within a few weeks could barely move. An armed party of 23 settlers and seven Aboriginal trackers under the command of Commissioner Frederick Powlett was tasked with apprehending them, and on 20 November, Powlett surrounded and ambushed the group.

The five Tasmanians arrived in Melbourne as prisoners on 26 November. Maulboyheenner and Peevay were charged with murder, while the three women were charged as accessories. Maulboyheenner's defence was that he had mistaken the whalers for Watson; he explained that they had been told by another settler that Watson was responsible for the death of Lacklay. Their appointed counsel Redmond Barry unsuccessfully argued that it was unfair to try members of what he termed an "alien people" in an unfamiliar courtroom. As the five defendants were not Christians, they were not permitted to testify; Barry was forced to enter a plea of not guilty on their behalf when it became clear that they did not understand what was taking place in the courtroom.

At their trial Robinson testified to the positive character of the defendants. He also argued that Truganini and the other women should not be blamed, as they were under the control of the men. The jury acquitted the three women but convicted Maulboyheenner and Peevay, while recommending a merciful sentence. The judge, John Walpole Willis, rejected this recommendation of mercy and sentenced the two men to death by hanging. They were hanged on 20 January 1842 in front of a crowd of 4000–5000 people in what was the first legal execution to take place in the Port Phillip District. According to the diaries of the minister Joseph Orton, Truganini was greatly anguished by their deaths.

== Oyster Cove ==
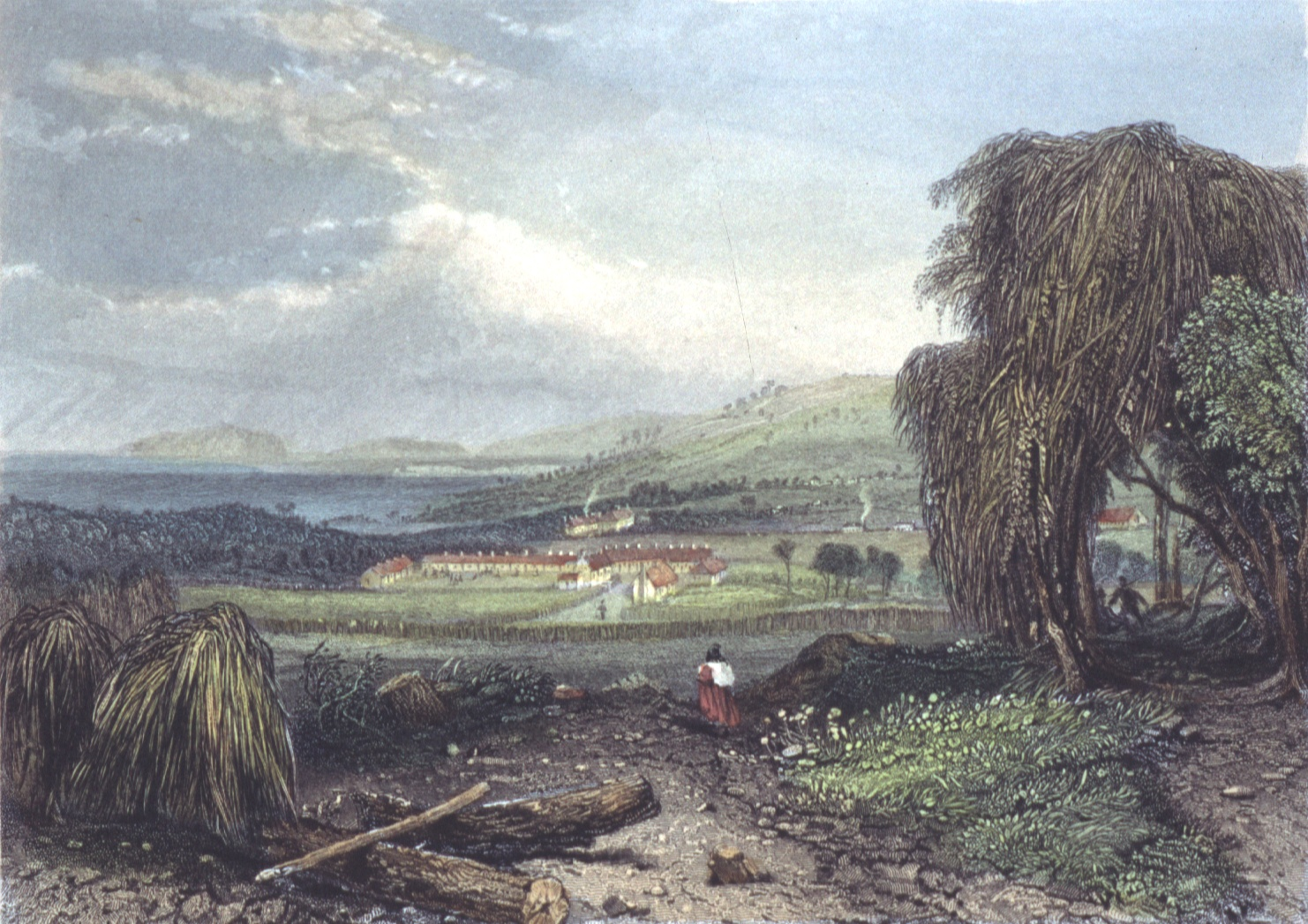
Illustration of the settlement at Oyster Cove

In July 1842, Truganini was transported back to Wybalenna on Flinders Island. Woureddy died on the journey, likely of syphilis. The superintendent Henry Jeanneret forced the 54 remaining residents at Wybalenna to work, speak English, and practice Christianity. Truganini resisted these rules and often ran away with local sealers. The superintendent forced her into a marriage with Mannapackername, also known as "King Alphonso", a senior member of the Big River people whom he regarded as responsible. While the superintendent hoped that this would curb Truganini's behaviour, both Truganini and Mannapackername rebelled. After the residents sent petitions to Queen Victoria and to the colony's governor to protest their treatment, the colonial secretary decided in May 1847 that the Wybalenna settlement should be disestablished.

It was decided that the 47 survivors at Wybalenna would be transferred to an abandoned convict settlement at Oyster Cove. Following their arrival there on 18 October 1847, the settler authorities largely abandoned their attempts to force the surviving Indigenous Tasmanians to adopt European practices. Truganini spent her time hunting marsupials and diving for shellfish, frequently returning to her country on Bruny Island. The mortality rate at Oyster Cove was high, in part due to an influx of alcohol onto the station. The practice of medicating the Aboriginal residents with mercury chloride likely also contributed to high rates of mental illness and psychotic disorders. In 1855 an inspection of the settlement revealed that the residents were not being cared for and that living conditions were poor.

A new superintendent, John Strange Dandridge, took over at Oyster Cove in July 1855 and made some improvements to the living conditions. In 1858, however, it was reported that alcohol abuse was prevalent among the residents. Truganini had entered a relationship with a younger Aboriginal man named William Lanne who was employed as a whaler and was violent towards her while drunk. By 1859, there were only 14 surviving Aboriginal Tasmanians at Oyster Cove.

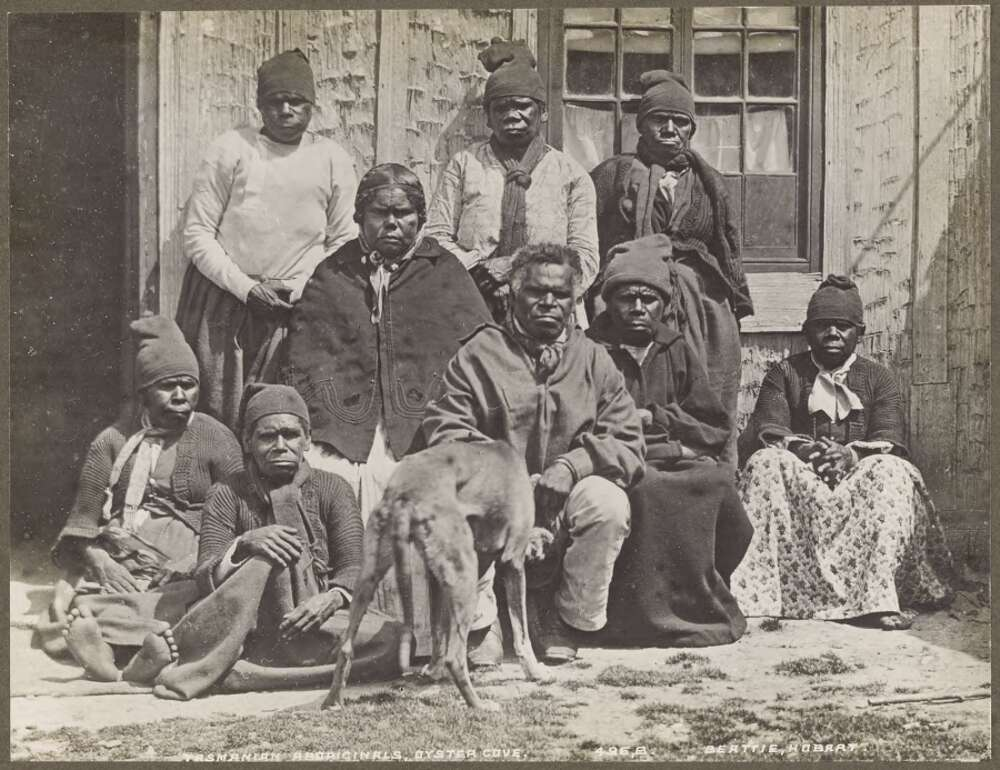
1860 photograph of the nine surviving Aboriginal Tasmanians at Oyster Cove; Truganini pictured far right

The prospect that the Aboriginal population of Tasmania would soon become "extinct" triggered a wave of scientific interest in the survivors at Oyster Cove. Museums and collectors began to gather artefacts and human remains from the settlement. Truganini's only remaining friend and clanswoman, Dray, died in 1861, leaving Truganini alone in her hut while Lanne was absent on whaling expeditions. She and the other survivors had become curiosities for the settler population and were frequently photographed in studios in Hobart and Oyster Cove. In 1868 Truganini and Lanne were presented to the Duke of Edinburgh.

Lanne, who was understood to be the last surviving male Aboriginal Tasmanian, died on 3 March 1869. Amid a dispute over who should take possession of his body, his remains were mutilated and plundered by members of the Royal Society who wished to secure his skeleton for their collection. Truganini, who was labelled the last "full-blooded" Aboriginal Tasmanian following his death, became the subject of even greater scientific curiosity. Disturbed by the treatment of Lanne's body, she begged a minister with whom she had developed a friendship to ensure that she would be buried at sea and that the museum collectors would not steal her body.

== Death ==
In 1872, with Truganini the only Aboriginal Tasmanian left living at Oyster Cove, it was decided that the land and buildings would be sold. Truganini was moved to Hobart to live in the Dandridge family home. After Dandridge's death in 1874, she continued to be cared for by his widow, and in 1875 the Tasmanian government agreed to employ a nurse for her after she contracted bronchitis. Truganini fascinated Hobart's residents and received frequent visits from scientists and photographers in her final years. She begged her doctor to ensure that she would be buried "behind the mountains" and that her body would not be mutilated by scientists. Truganini fell into a coma on 4 May 1876, and died on 8 May.

=== Remains and repatriation ===
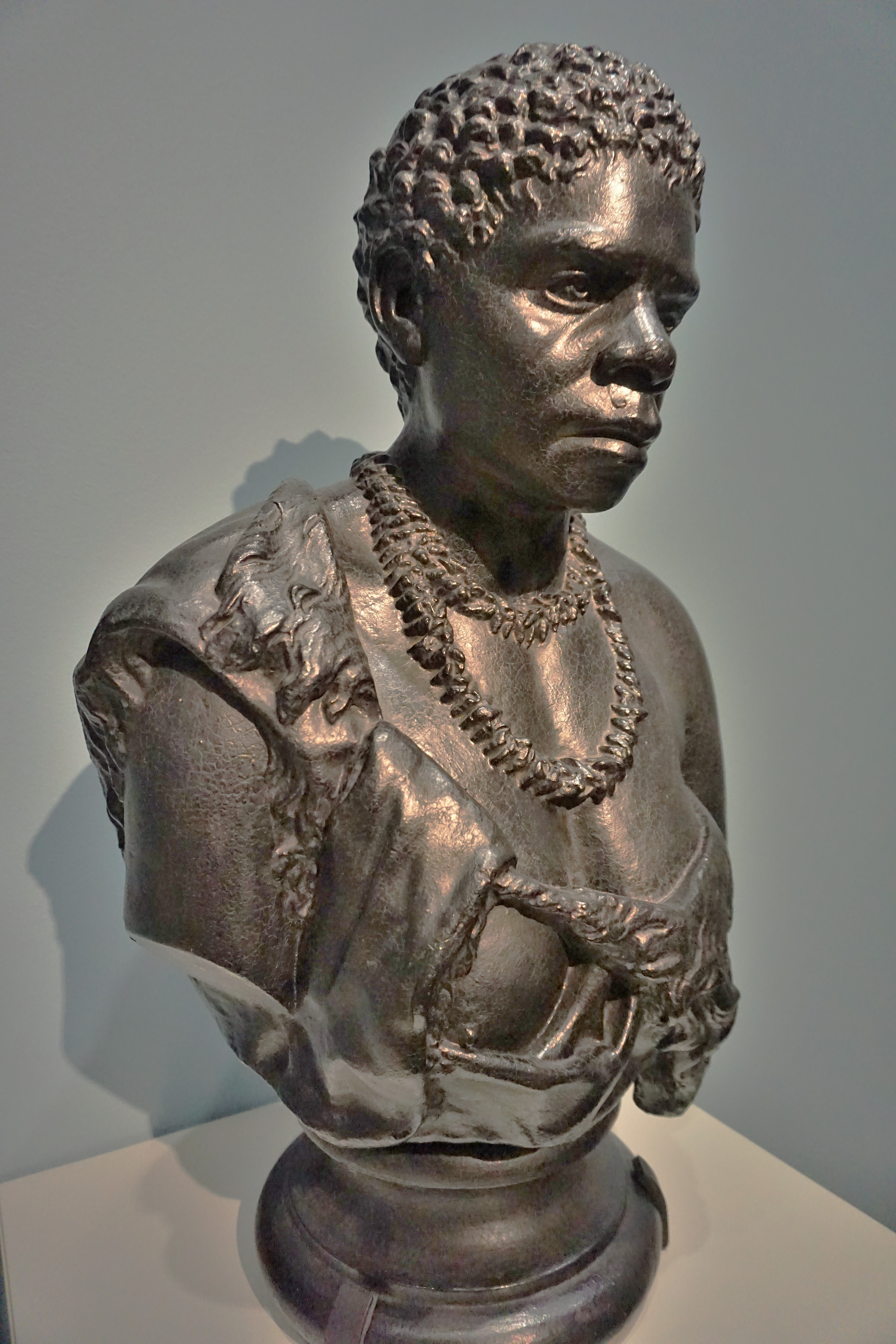
Benjamin Law's 1835 bust of Truganini

After Truganini's death, the Secretary of the Royal Society requested her remains for scientific research. The Tasmanian government declined this request, but permitted the society to take a cast of Truganini's face. Her body was buried at the Female Factory in Hobart (a former workhouse for female convicts) to protect her from body snatchers. In 1878, after a campaign by the Royal Society, her body was disinterred with instructions that it should not be exhibited and should be used only for scientific purposes. About a decade later, however, her skull was put on public display at the Melbourne Centennial Exhibition. In 1904 the surgeon Richard James Arthur Berry created an articulated skeleton composed of her skeletal remains for display at the Tasmanian Museum along with several replicas, one of which was put on display at the Museum of Victoria.

Campaigners began to demand in the 1930s that her remains be reburied according to her wishes. The Anglican Archdeacon Henry Brune Atkinson, the son of a minister who had grown close to Truganini in her final years, revealed in 1932 that his father had written in his diaries that Truganini had pleaded with him to ensure that she would be buried at sea in the D'Entrecasteaux Channel. Under pressure, the Tasmanian Museum ceased exhibiting Truganini's skeleton in 1947, but retained possession. The museum reached a permanent agreement, negotiated by the Anglican Bishop of Tasmania, to limit public access to her skeletal remains in 1954. After legal efforts by the Tasmanian Aboriginal Centre, the Tasmanian government passed legislation in 1975 to assume ownership of her remains. Her remains were cremated and scattered in the D'Entrecasteaux Channel in 1976. In 2002 and 2005 the Royal College of Surgeons returned additional samples of Truganini's skin and hair to the Tasmanian Aboriginal community. Artefacts associated with Truganini have also been returned; in 1997 a necklace and bracelet belonging to Truganini that had first been displayed in Exeter in 1933 were returned by the Royal Albert Memorial Museum to the Tasmanian Aboriginal Centre.

== Legacy ==
=== Extinction myth ===
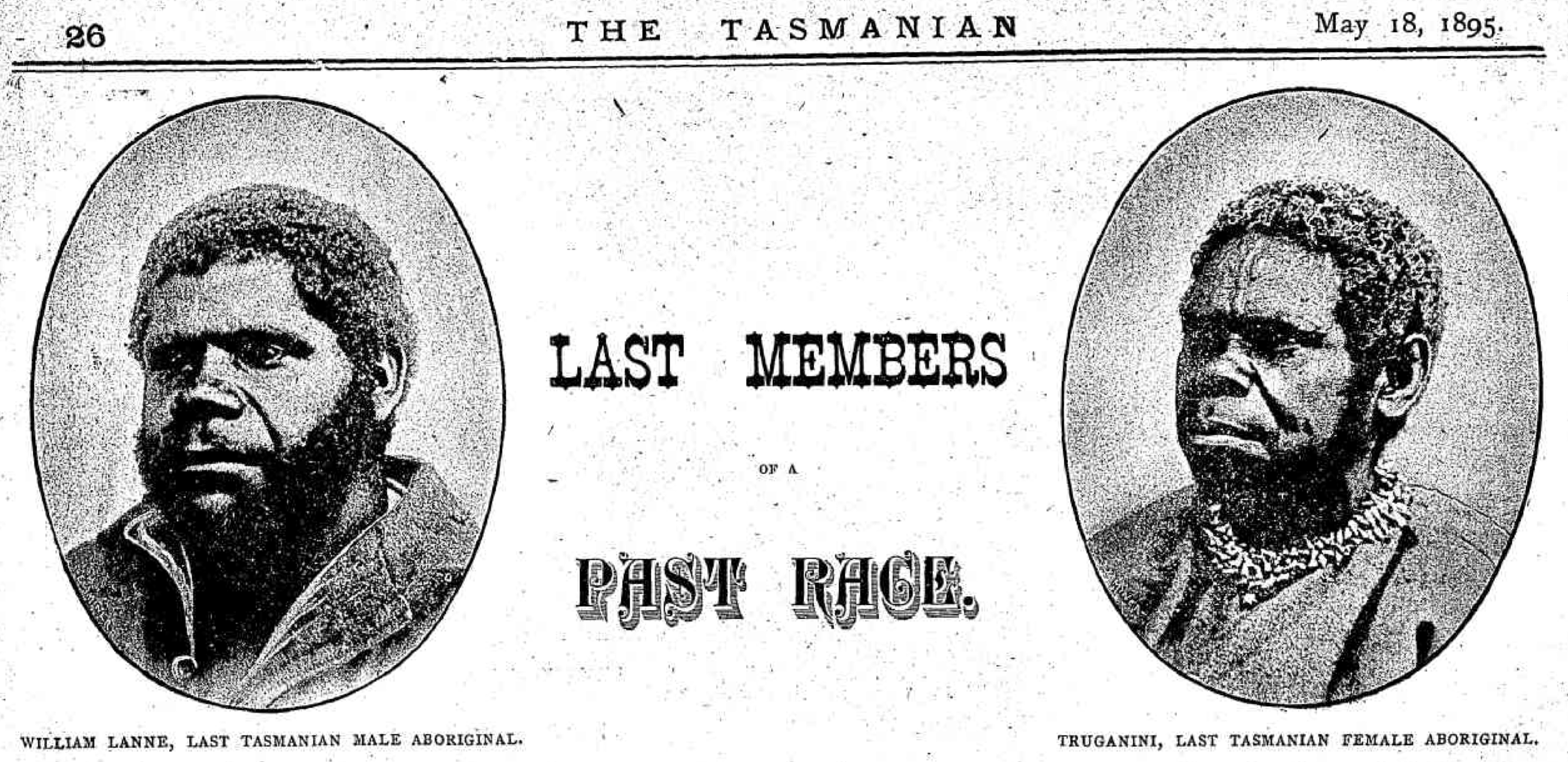
Portraits of Truganini and William Lanne published in The Tasmanian in 1895

Upon the death of Truganini, the Tasmanian government declared the island's Aboriginal population extinct. The narrative that Truganini was the last surviving Aboriginal Tasmanian had been reinforced before her death by the widely read 1870 book The Last of the Tasmanians, which cast Truganini as the last remnant of her doomed people. Narratives regarding Aboriginal Tasmanians in the years surrounding her death often framed them as a proud and noble people whose extinction was a sad but inevitable consequence of British colonisation. The genocide scholar Tom Lawson argues that the extinction narrative served to reinforce the supposed power and superiority of the British Empire by presenting the Tasmanian Aboriginal community as having "simply been swept away by [its] might".

The narratives that formed in the years surrounding Truganini's death led to an enduring popular belief that Tasmania's Aboriginal population had become extinct upon her death. (Note: The belief that Truganini was the last "full-blooded" Aboriginal Tasmanian was also mistaken. Two Aboriginal women from Tasmania who had been taken to Kangaroo Island in South Australia outlived Truganini. Fanny Cochrane Smith and her descendants were also alive at the time of Truganini's death, although whether Smith was a "full-blooded" or "half-caste" Aboriginal woman was debated.) However, a substantial community of Aboriginal Tasmanians continued to be born on Cape Barren Island and other islands in the Furneaux Group. This community, referred to as the Islanders, were descended from the children of Aboriginal women and white sealers and were seen as "hybrids" by the colonists. Their claims of Aboriginal identity were widely dismissed until the latter half of the 20th century on account of their mixed descent and the widespread view that Aboriginality was a fixed and biological characteristic that relied on "full-bloodedness". The historian Lyndall Ryan's 1981 book The Aboriginal Tasmanians was among the first works of history to challenge the extinction myth and argue for the existence of a surviving community of Aboriginal Tasmanians.

In the aftermath of the Second World War, as genocide entered public discourse, the treatment of Aboriginal Tasmanians began to provoke greater discomfort. A campaign from members of the public led to the removal of Truganini's skeleton from public display at the Tasmanian Museum in 1947. In 1948 the writer Clive Turnbull published Black War: The Extermination of the Tasmanian Aborigines, in which he presented Truganini as an active figure who resisted the extermination of her people. This new mythology influenced the creation of artistic and literary depictions of Truganini as symbolic of a genocide perpetrated against the Tasmanian Aboriginal population. The historian Rebe Taylor wrote in 2012 that Truganini had become a symbol of white Australians' guilt at the extermination of her people.

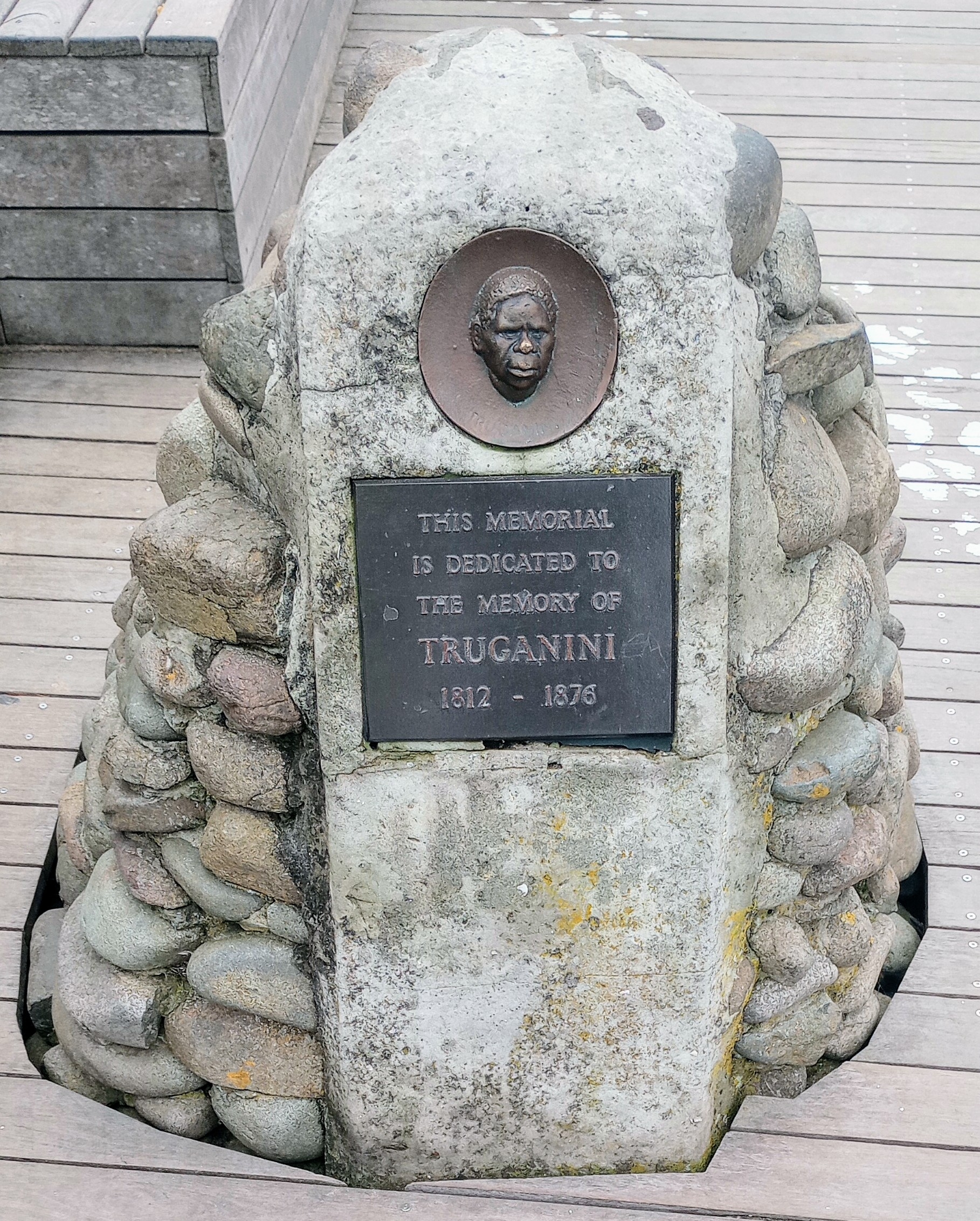
Truganini memorial at Truganini Lookout, Bruny Island

The late 1970s saw the emergence of post-colonial scholarship and a more vocal Aboriginal rights movement, including activism by the Tasmanian Aboriginal Centre for the repatriation of Aboriginal remains. This period also saw some revisionist accounts of Truganini's legacy. In 1976 Vivienne Rae-Ellis published a controversial revisionist biography of Truganini titled Trucanini: Queen or Traitor? in which she presented Truganini as a femme fatale who betrayed her people by collaborating with European settlers. In the 1990s, historiographies of the competing narratives surrounding Truganini's life and legacy began to be developed. The cultural studies scholar Suvendrini Perera wrote in 1996 that Truganini had become "a marker of semiotic complexity" and that "her body is the site of competing narratives about power and powerlessness: agent or object, hostage or traitor, final victim or ultimate survivor?". Truganini was also reclaimed as an anti-colonial figure by some members of the Aboriginal community. Taylor writes that Truganini became "the national confessional" and the "poster girl of our national story of indigenous dispossession".

Truganini also became a focal point of debates over the status of Tasmania's Indigenous population. The 1978 documentary The Last Tasmanian rekindled the narrative that the Tasmanian Aboriginal population had become extinct upon Truganini's death. The documentary prompted backlash from the modern Tasmanian Aboriginal community, who reasserted their enduring culture and Aboriginal identity. The community later protested a reference to Truganini as the "last Tasmanian" on the sleeve notes of the 1993 Midnight Oil song "Truganini", arguing that it perpetuated the myth of Aboriginal Tasmanian extinction; the band eventually apologised. According to Lawson, narratives of Tasmanian extinction and extermination have persisted in Britain into the 21st century.

In 2009 a group of Aboriginal Tasmanians protested at Sotheby's against the sale of copies of Benjamin Law's 1835 busts of Truganini and Woureddy. They were ultimately successful in having the sale cancelled after arguing that the community should be given the right to control how depictions of their ancestors could be used and put on display. The protest became a flashpoint in debates about Aboriginal rights, with some conservative writers using the saga to condemn what one of them described as the radicalism of the "ultra-left Aboriginal fringe". The art historian David Hansen wrote an essay on the debate titled Seeing Truganini, in which he argued that it was wrong to give contemporary Aboriginal communities the final say over artistic representations of Aboriginal history.

=== Cultural depictions ===
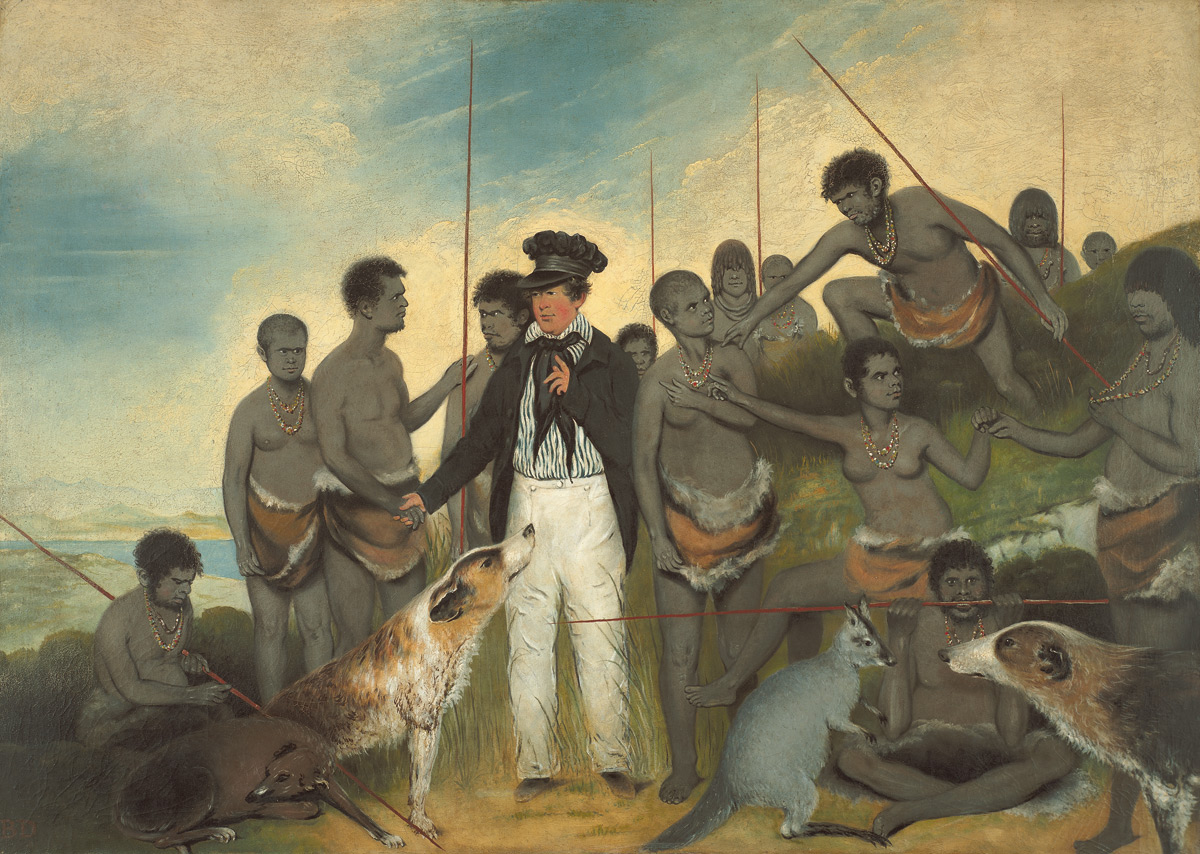
1840 painting The Conciliation by Benjamin Duterrau

In 1997 Ryan wrote that Truganini had been the subject of more than 50 poems, at least 50 paintings and photographs, and about 50 scientific papers, and had been featured in novels, plays, and a stamp. In these depictions, Ryan said that Truganini had been variously "revered, rebuked, sensationalised, sensualised, vilified, mocked, and politicised". Some portrayals of Truganini have been compared to those of the native American woman Pocahontas, with both presented as a "native princess" selflessly saving the life of a settler.

One widely debated representation of Truganini is Benjamin Duterrau's 1840 painting The Conciliation. It depicts a meeting between Robinson and a group of Aboriginal Tasmanians, who agree to cease fighting and enter into exile. In the book Black War, Turnbull argued that Truganini is depicted standing next to Robinson, symbolically attempting to resist the exile of her people. Rae-Ellis, who wrote that Truganini was a traitor to her people, suggested that Truganini was instead the figure second from the right in the act of betraying her people to Robinson. Other historians have said that Truganini is one of the women depicted at the far back of the painting. Ryan reinterpreted the painting as displaying tension between Robinson's Indigenous guides and the rival Big River people, arguing that the painting depicts the diversity of Indigenous Tasmanian experiences rather than Truganini's submission.

== See also ==
- List of Indigenous Australian historical figures
