= Kikatapula =

Indigenous Tasmanian resistance leader

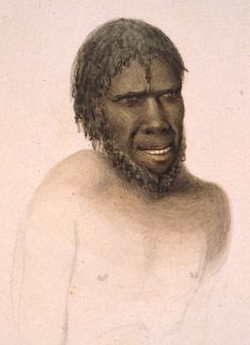
- Painting of Kikatapula by Thomas Bock
- Born: c. 1800
- Died: 13 May 1832; Emu Bay
- Other names: Kickerterpoller, Black Tom, Black Tom Birch, Kikatamana
- Spouse: Pagerly (Tuererningher)

Kikatapula (c. 1800 – 13 May 1832) was a leading Indigenous figure during the British invasion and colonisation of Van Diemen's Land, later known as Tasmania. Also called Kickerterpoller or Black Tom Birch, he spent part of his youth living with the colonists, learning English and being baptised as a Christian. During the 1820s, he withdrew from British ways, and became a feared and formidable leader of Indigenous resistance during the early stages of the Black War.

He was eventually caught and jailed and, with limited options, he agreed to act as a guide for a roving party of armed colonists to capture other Aboriginal Tasmanians or Palawa as they are also known. Kikatapula was then ordered to accompany George Augustus Robinson on his 'friendly mission' to round up the remaining Indigenous people and exile them to Flinders Island. After the successful removal of the most notable Palawa (including himself), Kikatapula died guiding Robinson during a later expedition in 1832.

== Early life ==
Kikatapula was born around the year 1800 into the Paytirami clan of the Oyster Bay people from Eastern Tasmania. As a young child, he witnessed the arrival of the first European sailing vessel his clan had seen. It anchored off Maria Island, with his people running away from it, not knowing what it could be.

British sealers arrived in the region soon after, rapidly obtaining a reputation for brutality and the kidnapping of young Palawa women and girls to be used as their sex slaves. Some of Kikatapula's female kin were abducted in this manner, and his clan destroyed the sealers' furs and huts in revenge.

By the 1810s, convict bushrangers and pastoral settlers had entered the Oyster Bay region, bringing further violence and displacement upon his people. Kikatapula also experienced conflict with displaced traditional enemy tribes, such as the Tyerrernotepanner while still a youth. He bore a large notable scar in the middle of his forehead, inflicted from an unknown source during his harsh upbringing.

== Household of Thomas Birch ==
At some stage during his adolescence, Kikatapula became closely associated with Thomas Birch, a prominent British colonist who arrived in Hobart in 1808. Birch had significant whaling and sealing interests in eastern Tasmania, having an outpost at Grindstone Bay in the heart of Kikatapula's Paytirami homeland. In late 1818, there was severe conflict between the Paytirami and Birch's men, and it seems that Kikatapula arrived or was taken to Hobart around this time, as he is recorded as being in the hospital at Hobart in early 1819.

Thomas Birch and his wife Sarah, took a keen interest in and became quite fond of Kikatapula. They accommodated him in their Hobart mansion, teaching him to read and write English, letting him take care of their children, and baptising him in the Christian faith. He was given his patron's name of Tom Birch, but was more commonly known as Black Tom.

In 1820, the Birches put Kikatapula to work on their Duck Hole Farm near Richmond and he also briefly worked as a guide for a British surveying team. In 1821, Thomas Birch died and with it Kikatapula lost one of his main sources of protection in the colonial world that he was transplanted into. He was subsequently treated poorly by the other workers at the farm.

In late 1822, an Aboriginal man from New South Wales who had been sent to Van Diemen's Land for resisting British occupation in the Sydney region, camped at Duck Hole Farm. His name was Musquito, and he was the leader of a group of refugee Palawa men and women called the "tame mob". Musquito convinced Kikatapula to leave the British lifestyle, return to his people and join his mob.

== Insurgency against the British ==
With their combined grievances against the British, and having a gang of Aboriginal followers which at times numbered over 100 Oyster Bay, Big River and Bruny Island people; Musquito and Kikatapula came to be a significant force against the colonists.

In November 1823, their "tame mob" were camped back at Grindstone Bay, which had been a favourite hunting ground for the Oyster Bay people but was now part of Silas Gatehouse's sheep property. Musquito bartered with the stockmen there and arranged for three Aboriginal women to provide sexual services for the stockmen in exchange for food. When the women were returned, a stockmen shot one of them in the back. The "tame mob" exacted their revenge by killing two of the stockmen and severely wounding another.

A punitive expedition tracked down and dispersed the mob near Swansea. By December though, they managed to regroup and raid a settler property at Mayfield Bay, setting fire to the house and killing a servant. They then raided farms at Cranbrook before retreating into the interior.

Musquito encouraged Kikatapula to leave the mob and return to Hobart, perhaps so that he could avoid further responsibility for their attacks. On arriving in the town, Kikatapula was arrested and it was organised for him to be transported to the Macquarie Harbour Penal Station in the remote west of the colony. However, Sarah Birch intervened on his behalf and he was released from custody. He immediately fled the settlement and returned to rejoin Musquito and his mob. The gang of insurgents then continued raiding farms and killing settlers throughout the southeast and central parts of the island, with Kikatapula being clearly identified as a leader.

In June 1824, the gang were preparing to ransack the homestead at Lovely Banks near Colebrook, when Sarah Birch came out of the house and begged Kikatapula to desist. Unaware that Sarah had moved there from Hobart, Kikatapula broke off the attack. Sarah convinced him to leave the gang and join her at Lovely Banks as a farmhand. Kikatapula agreed and stayed at the property. Musquito and the gang continued raiding but in August 1824, Musquito was finally captured and held in custody at Old Hobart Gaol.

Hearing of Musquito's incarceration, Kikatapula left Lovely Banks in October, and was almost certainly the leader of a group of 64 members of the Oyster Bay tribe who courageously entered Hobart to solicit Musquito's release. Although Governor George Arthur was receptive to their entreaties and ordered some huts to be built at Kangaroo Point to accommodate them, Musquito remained incarcerated and the disappointed Oyster Bay people soon returned to the bush and continued their insurgency.

After Musquito and another Aboriginal man named Black Jack were both found guilty and hanged to death in February 1825, followed by another two of Kikatapula's kinsmen being executed in 1826, Kikatapula became furious. With the concurrent continued violent expansion of the British into Palawa lands, Kikatapula and other leaders of the resistance stepped up their operations resulting in the conflict becoming even more bloody, evolving into what is known as the Black War.

== Capture and release ==
Kikatapula considered his people who had died at the hands of the British as martyrs and was determined that it was his patriotic duty to inflict injury upon the white man. Throughout 1825 and 1826 he led many raids against the colonists, which resulted in over a dozen settlers being killed, some of which Kikatapula had personal enmities with.

By late 1826, colonial newspapers were calling not only for his capture, but for the extermination of all 'the natives' from the island, and large punitive expeditions were massacring dozens of Palawa.

In November of that year, a detachment of constables and soldiers of the 40th Regiment caught up with Kikatapula's gang at Bank Head Farm near Orielton. In a morning attack, the soldiers killed 14 Palawa and captured another 10, including Kikatapula.

Kikatapula was placed in Richmond Gaol, where Governor Arthur came to visit him. Probably because Kikatapula spoke English quite well and had been baptised making him eligible to give evidence under oath at court, Arthur was reluctant to charge him with any crime. If Kikatapula was placed on trial, he would give sworn statements of the widespread killings of Aboriginal people by the colonists which would embarrass and in turn bring legal charges against those in authority. Arthur therefore, to the ire of the colonial press, released Kikatapula without charge in January 1827.

== Continued conflict and re-imprisonment ==
Kikatapula returned to the war-zone and continued the fight against colonisation throughout 1827. In a skirmish with the British in April that possibly killed 30 Palawa, Kikatapula was reported as being shot dead, but this proved false and the raids continued.

In November 1827, at Bryn Estyn near New Norfolk, Kikatapula was recaptured by local constables and transferred to Hobart Gaol. The same problems of charging him with any crimes and his giving of disturbing evidence still existed, so the authorities held him without charge.

In the meantime, the Black War continued to worsen during his incarceration, with Governor Arthur declaring that 'the natives' should be driven from settled districts altogether. Bands of armed 'roving parties' were deployed to extirpate the Palawa from wherever they were found. Other Palawa leaders such as Tongerlongeter, Montpelliatta and Umarrah took the fight up against the British.

On 17 July 1828, just he was previously, Kikatapula was formally discharged from custody. This time though, with the hostile intent of the colonists at large being overt and probably assuming he would be shot dead on the streets of Hobart, Kikatapula refused to leave the jail. He petitioned Governor Arthur to send him to England, where he would be safe from colonial retribution, but instead Arthur kept him locked up.

While continuing his stay in jail, Kikatapula met with George Augustus Robinson, an English builder and evangelical Christian, who would regularly minister the prisoners, with Kikatapula assisting him in church services. Robinson also recorded some words from his native language. Robinson helped Kikatapula to become conciliated with British rule and when Governor Arthur suggested that Kikatapula become a mediator between the remaining Palawa and the colonists, Kikatapula agreed. Arthur then installed the former resistance leader in the role of a guide to one of the 'roving parties' tasked with capturing his former comrades.

== 'Roving party' guide ==
Kikatapula was posted to guide the 'roving party' of Gilbert Robertson, the son of a wealthy Scottish plantation owner and his black slave mistress. With six soldiers of the 40th Regiment, Robertson and Kikatapula set out from Richmond in November 1828 to hunt down 'the blacks'.

They soon tracked a group of Palawa near Little Swanport and after a brief skirmish, captured five people, including Umarrah who was a leading figure of the Tyerrernotepanner tribe. It is perhaps not surprising that Kikatapula led the soldiers to these people who were his traditional enemies. Governor Arthur was pleased with Kikatapula and this outcome, and held Umarrah in jail not as a criminal but as a prisoner of war.

Kikatapula continued to be a guide for Robertson's 'roving party' for much of 1829, but being employed to track down and capture his own people became disconcerting to him. He therefore became non-compliant and obstructive in guiding the soldiers to Palawa hideouts. Much to the frustration of Robertson, his 'roving party' failed to capture a single Aborigine for the whole of 1829. Blame was directly placed on Kikatapula and the other Palawa guides for being duplicitous and Kikatapula was removed from the role in December 1829.

== 'Friendly mission' guide ==
Kikatapula was then immediately transferred to the position of a guide for George Augustus Robinson's 'friendly mission'. This mission was planned to act as conciliatory expedition to make amicable contact with Palawa in the remote western areas of Van Diemen's Land. But during its progress, it developed into an expedition to herd all Palawa remaining in Tasmania out of their country and into enforced exile on the small islands of Bass Strait.

Robinson and his mission set out from Hobart in January 1830 with Kikatapula and eleven other Palawa guides to act as envoys in contacting the Indigenous peoples. The other eleven Palawa included Truganini, Umarrah, Woureddy and Kikatapula's future wife Pagerly. They first travelled with difficulty through the rugged southwest region of the island, meeting some Ninene people from around the Port Davey area. They then proceeded north along the west coast toward Cape Grim, encountering more Palawa, but having Umarrah abscond along the way. The Van Diemen's Land Company had appropriated a large area of land at Cape Grim and Robinson was told of the Cape Grim massacre of Aboriginal people by the company's workers. The mission managed to rescue a young Palawa man named Tunnerminnerwait from the sealers located at nearby Robbins Island.

In July 1830, they reached Circular Head where Robinson was informed of Governor Arthur's new proclamation of a bounty of £5 for each Palawa captured. Robinson quickly changed the goal of the mission from one of friendly meetings to coercive assembly.

The mission arrived in Launceston in October, where they heard of the Black Line, which was Governor Arthur's next plan to remove the Aboriginal people of Van Diemen's Land by having a line of thousands of colonists many miles long, drive the remaining Palawa southeast into the Forestier Peninsula. Robinson's mission was to join the Black Line operation but instead continued northeast to try and locate Palawa there. Robinson soon established a base at Swan Island to place all the Palawa he had rounded-up. After staying here several weeks, Kikatapula became listless and although considered married to Pagerly, began womanising. Robinson was unhappy with this behaviour and took Kikatapula with him to Hobart in January 1831 to discuss finalising the plans for the exile of all Palawa onto Flinders Island.

== Tracking down the last remaining Oyster Bay/Big River people ==
In Hobart, Governor Arthur gave permission for Robinson to take his Palawa guides and round-up the last of the Oyster Bay and Big River people still holding out in central and eastern Van Diemen's Land. Robinson first took all the Palawa living and imprisoned in Hobart back to Swan Island, where he moved the site of exile firstly to Gun Carriage Island, then to Flinders Island.

In June 1831, Robinson with Kikatapula and his other guides set out to collect the estimated 76 Indigenous people left in the whole of the eastern half of Tasmania. Kikatapula, by this stage having resided upon the barren islands reserved for their exile, had no inclination of turning over his remaining people to the British. His indifference forced Robinson to obtain the services of another Palawa man named Mannalargenna to help guide him.

With Mannalargenna's aid, the mission found Umarrah and his associates in late August and finally toward the end of the year, they located the last hold-outs of the Oyster Bay / Big River people just north of Lake Echo in the central highlands. This group of only 16 people which included the resistance leaders Tongerlongeter and Montpelliatta was all that was left of a population that numbered over a thousand only a few decades previously.

== Last expedition and death ==
After a brief return to Hobart with their captives, Kikatapula and the forty other Palawa were hastily shipped off to Flinders Island for their enforced exile. The Black War was over and Van Diemen's Land had been almost completely ethnically cleansed of its Indigenous population.

Kikatapula, however, soon rejoined with Robinson in Launceston to undertake a further expedition back to the northwest of Tasmania to gather the few remaining Palawa there and take them to the Wybalenna Aboriginal Establishment on Flinders Island. Robinson was to be paid £1,000 for this. Kikatapula, for all his work for the government over the last few years had been promised a boat, but he never saw it.

In April 1832, they set out from Launceston but Kikatapula soon fell ill. He continued on, but his condition worsened through April and in May Robinson had to leave him at Emu Bay. Around 13 May, Kikatapula died and was buried at the back of the Van Diemen's Land Company store. His was the first Christian burial at what is now Burnie. His unmarked grave is located in the park between West Beach and North Terrace at the top end of Wilson Street.

== See also ==
- List of Indigenous Australian historical figures
