= Tongerlongeter =

Indigenous Tasmanian resistance leader

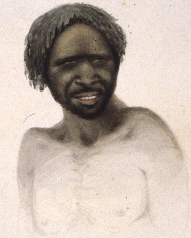
- Born: c. 1790
- Died: 20 June 1837; Wybaleena
- Other names: Tukalunginta, Togerlongerter, King William
- Known for: Resistance to the British colonisation of Australia
- Spouse: Droomteemetyer
- Children: 1

Tongerlongeter (c. 1790 – 20 June 1837) also spelled Tukalunginta, was a leader of the Poredareme clan of Aboriginal Tasmanians and a commanding figure of the Aboriginal resistance to British colonisation during the Black War in Tasmania.

== Early life ==
Details of Tongerlongeter's early life are sparse. He was born around the year 1790 into the precolonial Aboriginal society of the Poredareme group of people who resided along the coast and inland from Great Oyster Bay in Eastern Tasmania. By the 1810s, when the British started to encroach on Poredareme country, Tongerlongeter had become a tall, powerful and intelligent man.

== Black War ==
European Seal hunters and whalers began exploiting Poredareme country during the late 1810s and early 1820s. They exhibited extreme violence against the local Aboriginal population, raiding their encampments, killing the men and abducting the women and girls into sexual slavery and forced labour. Those killed and kidnapped would have been well known to Tongerlongeter causing him and his people great anger and distress.

By 1823 and 1824, the prominent colonist, George Meredith, had established a settlement at Swansea and financed a number of sealing and whaling stations around Great Oyster Bay. Approximately forty other British settlers also entered the region at the same time, taking land from the Poredareme. This had a calamitous effect on the everyday life of the Aboriginal clan, forcing them to find ways to survive and resist an invading people who were alien, numerous and hostile.

In December 1823, hutkeepers at a recently taken up property at Grindstone Bay just north of what is now Triabunna, shot dead a Poredareme woman after abducting and raping her. A group of Poredareme men led by Black Jack (who was reportedly Tongerlongeter's brother) and Musquito (who was an Aboriginal outlaw originally from Sydney), led a reprisal attack on the hutkeepers killing two of them. Tongerlongeter was probably involved in this attack.

Groups of armed British men scoured the region for months afterwards, killing a considerable number of Poredareme. Musquito and Black Jack were captured and executed in February 1825. Despite this, the Poredareme, continued to resist occupation, attacking and killing colonists as the opportunity arose.

In 1826, another of Tongerlongeter's brothers was captured and executed. By this stage, Tongerlongeter, along with another Poredareme man named Kikatapula, had become leaders of what was left of the clan. He had seen many of his relatives and friends killed or abducted, and access to his ancestral lands had been removed. Revenge, as well as survival, became a focus of his continuing resistance. By 1827, a British Army military outpost consisting of 27 soldiers was established on Poredareme territory. Kickertopoller was captured in the same year, leaving Tongerlongeter in command of the remnant Poredareme and other Oyster Bay clans.

In 1828, most of the best land in Tasmania had been forcibly acquired by British colonists. The remaining Aboriginal people in the central and eastern parts of Tasmania numbered only several dozen, reduced by colonial violence from a pre-colonisation population of up to 2,000 people. Under these pressures, the remaining eastern Tasmanian Aboriginal people under Tongerlongeter amalgamated with the so-called "Big River" people whose country was the central part of the island and whose leader was a man named Montpelliatta.

Under Tongerlongeter and Montpelliatta the Oyster Bay – Big River mob did not only continue their defiance; they were also able to increase the severity of their attacks. Women and children of the colonists were increasingly targeted, causing heightened anxiety for the British authorities. Governor George Arthur authorised roving parties of military personnel and armed colonists to search for and destroy the remaining Aboriginal people. In November 1828, he also declared martial law over the settled districts, allowing Aboriginal people to be killed with impunity. Tongerlongeter's encampment was subsequently ambushed with his wife and another woman being abducted and a man being shot dead. Tongerlongeter, however, and others were able to escape.

In 1830, Aboriginal resistance continued with close to 100 attacks recorded in the Oyster Bay – Big River region. The Black War seemed to be intensifying in violence and in a desperate move, Governor Arthur instituted a strategy to try and end the resistance led by Tongerlongeter and Montpelliatta. He called upon almost all the resources of the colony to create the Black Line, a 300 km front of around 2,000 colonists to sweep the settled districts and capture or kill all the remaining Aboriginal people. By November, the result of the Black Line was failure, with the killing of only two Aborigines and the capture of another two.

Although Tongerlongeter, Montpelliatta and their people were able to break through and escape the Black Line, another armed party were able to ambush their camp at Den Hill in late 1830. The ambush killed 2 men and 3 women. Tongerlongeter survived but was shot in the forearm. His mangled lower arm was amputated below the elbow by his kinsmen using not much more than a sharpened rock to cut the flesh and smooth the bone, and a firestick to cauterise the stump.

== Surrender ==
Tongerlongeter and his group remained in the isolated highlands of central Tasmania for most of 1831. As a result, recorded conflict with the colonists dropped markedly. While he recovered from his amputation, his new wife, Droomteemetyer, became pregnant, later giving birth to their son, Parperermanener, near what is now Ouse.

In the meanwhile, Governor Arthur had turned to diplomacy to try and force the remaining 40 or so Oyster Bay – Big River Aborigines to surrender. He employed George Augustus Robinson to organise a friendly mission composed of already surrendered Tasmanian Aboriginal people to track down and entice the remaining hold-outs to give up. Robinson also collected a word list of Tongerlongeter's native language.

In December 1831, Robinson with 14 Aboriginal envoys which included Kikatapula, Montpelliatta's kinswoman Polare, and other Tasmanian Aboriginal leaders Eumarrah and Mannalargenna, tracked down Tongerlongeter and Montpelliatta's camp. Realising that their friends and loved ones were amongst Robinson's group and that Robinson expressed the Governor's good intentions for their safety, Tongerlongeter and Montpelliatta surrendered to him. The people who were at that camp represented what remained of the Oyster Bay – Big River clans. They consisted only of 16 men, 9 women and one child.

== Exile to Flinders Island ==
On 7 January 1832, Tongerlongeter and the other Aboriginal people now attached to Robinson's party marched into Hobart, much to the curiosity of the residents. After meeting with Governor Arthur, they were all placed on board a ship ten days later and sent into forced exile on Flinders Island. Tongerlongeter's son fell ill along the way and died as soon as they arrived.

At the sites chosen for their habitation at The Lagoons and the Wybalenna Aboriginal Establishment, illness and death quickly became a frequent occurrence for the Aboriginal people removed to Flinders Island. However, Tongerlongeter was able to make the most of the situation and became the most prominent person at the settlement. He was given the title of King William and represented the Aboriginal people to the British administration in their grievances.

== Death ==
Severe illness, though, caught up with Tongerlongeter as well. In June 1837 he became sick with intestinal problems and died from peritonitis. Tongerlongeter was given the name 'King William' whilst at Wybalenna and died on the same day as William IV. His body lies in an unmarked grave at the Wybaleena Aboriginal burial ground.

== See also ==
- List of Indigenous Australian historical figures
