= Montpelliatta =

Aboriginal Tasmanian resistance leader

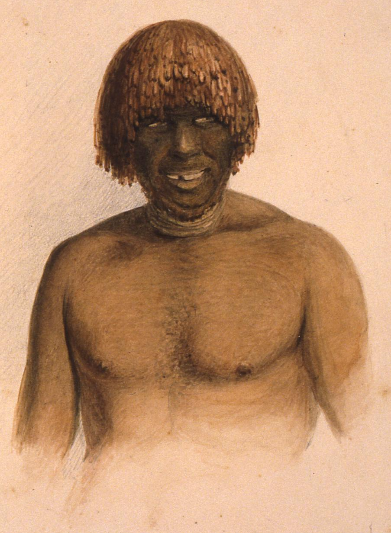
- A painting of Montpelliatta by Thomas Bock
- Born: c. 1790
- Died: 1836; Wybaleena
- Other names: Muntipiliyata, Montpeliater

Montpelliatta (c. 1790 – 1836) was a leader of the 'Big River' group of Aboriginal Tasmanian clans during the Black War of the 1820s and early 1830s in Tasmania. He is regarded as one of the main organisers of Aboriginal resistance to British colonisation during this period.

== Early life ==
Very little is known of Montpelliatta's early life. He was probably born around the year 1790 into the traditional Aboriginal society of the 'Big River' group of people who resided in central Tasmania before British colonisation.

== Black War ==
Conflict with the 'Big River' clans began in 1804 when a detachment of soldiers garrisoned at Risdon shot and killed several Aboriginal people while they were conducting a kangaroo hunt close to the newly established settlement. Further British incursions into their country continued into the 1810s with the arrival of pastoralists, bushrangers and escaped convicts from the settlements of Hobart and Launceston. Aboriginal people were often shot, with women and children abducted for sexual purposes or to be used as servants.

By 1826 the British pastoral expansion into central Tasmania had seen almost of the all prime land that was utilised by the 'Big River' people for hunting and cultural purposes usurped by the colonists. Montpelliatta later stated that during this time 'when the Aborigines left any place to go hunting elsewhere, and they returned in the course of eight days, they found a hut erected'.

It was apparent to Montpelliatta and his people that the invasive, hostile and numerous enemy had little regard for their right to live, which left them little other option than to fight for their survival. Consequently, a larger series of conflicts began between the colonists and the Aboriginal people which is generally known as the Black War.

Montpelliatta and others led raids and reprisals on the colonists, spearing and beating stockmen, setting fire to huts and plundering farms. Likewise the British colonists raided Aboriginal camps, killing and abducting people. By 1828, the loss of lives and land forced the 'Big River' people to amalgamate with the remnants of the neighbouring 'Oyster Bay' people of eastern Tasmania, to whom colonisation was having an equally devastating effect. Tongerlongeter of the 'Oyster Bay' people, together with Montpelliatta became the leaders of Aboriginal resistance in this region.

This resistance was having a significant effect on the economy of the British colony. Dozens of settlers were being killed and expansion was being stalled. Governor George Arthur declared martial law in November 1828, giving colonists impunity to kill Aboriginal people. Further to this, armed roving parties of military and civilians were sent into the countryside to search for and extirpate the remaining Aboriginal residents.

However, the Aboriginal resistance continued and the violence escalated with female settlers being increasingly targeted. Montpelliatta though was known to be selectively merciful, in one case personally protecting a white woman from violence.

In late 1830, Governor Arthur set in place a strategy that called upon almost all the resources of the colony to create the so-called Black Line, a 300 km front of around 2,000 colonists to sweep the settled districts and capture or kill all the remaining Aboriginal people. By the end of the year, the result of the Black Line was failure, with the killing of only two Aborigines and the capture of another two.

Montpelliatta and his remaining people had slipped through the line at a place near Bothwell and retreated to the isolated mountainous highlands of his country. Although they had not been captured, Tongerlongeter was seriously wounded, and the Black Line had forced Montpelliatta to remain in hiding for the first half of 1831, with Aboriginal raids declining significantly.

In August, though, Montpelliatta led a band northward out of the highlands, conducting a series of raids which culminated in the killing of the prominent colonist Bartholomew Thomas and his overseer near Port Sorell. However, this proved to be one of the last major incidents of Aboriginal resistance. The remaining people of the 'Big River' and 'Oyster Bay' clans numbered only a few dozen, down from a precolonial population of up to 2,000. Colonial violence had taken a massive toll on Montpelliatta's people and further resistance became impractical.

== Surrender ==
In the meanwhile, Governor Arthur had turned to diplomacy to try and force the remaining 40 or so Oyster Bay – Big River Aborigines to surrender. He employed George Augustus Robinson to organise a "friendly mission" composed of already surrendered Tasmanian Aboriginal people to track down and entice the remaining hold-outs to give up.

In December 1831, Robinson with 14 Aboriginal envoys which included Kikatapula, Montpelliatta's kinswoman Polare, and other Tasmanian Aboriginal leaders named Eumarrah and Mannalargenna, tracked down Tongerlongeter and Montpelliatta's camp. Realising that their friends and loved ones were amongst Robinson's group and that Robinson expressed the Governor's good intentions for their safety, Tongerlongeter and Montpelliatta surrendered to him. The people who were at that camp represented what remained of the Oyster Bay – Big River clans. They consisted only of 16 men, 9 women and one child.

== Exile and death on Flinders Island ==
On 7 January 1832, Montpelliatta and the other Aboriginal people now attached to Robinson's party marched into Hobart, much to the curiosity of the residents. After meeting with Governor Arthur, they were all placed on board a ship ten days later and sent into forced exile on Flinders Island.

At the sites chosen for their habitation at The Lagoons and Wybalenna, illness and death quickly became a frequent occurrence for the Aboriginal people. Montpelliatta appears to have become withdrawn and depressed at the loss of his people and homeland. He is barely mentioned in any documentation from Flinders Island and died at some stage during 1836.

== See also ==
- List of Indigenous Australian historical figures
