= Musquito =

Indigenous Australian bushranger and resistance leader

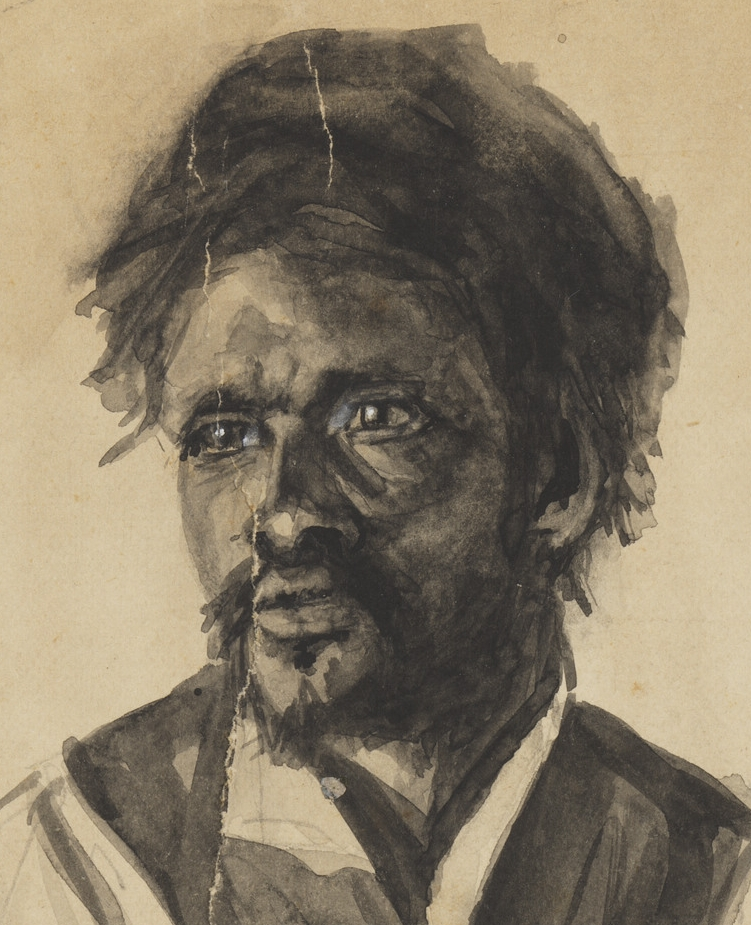
A retrospective portrait of Musquito, completed in the 1860s

Musquito (c. 1780 – 25 February 1825) (also rendered Mosquito, Musquetta, Bush Muschetta or Muskito) was an Indigenous Australian resistance leader, convict hunter and outlaw based firstly in the Sydney region of the British colony of New South Wales and, after a period in exile on Norfolk Island, in Van Diemen's Land.

== Early life ==
Musquito, of the Gai-Mariagal clan, also spelled Gamaragal, or Cammeraygal, of the North Shore of Sydney Harbour, was born around 1780.

== Resistance to British colonisation in the Sydney region ==
In 1805, there was serious conflict between the British colonists and the resident Indigenous Australians. Aboriginal men, such as Tedbury, Branch Jack and Musquito engaged in violent raids on British farms in the Parramatta, Hawkesbury and Georges River areas. Several settlers were killed and numerous Aboriginal people were shot dead. In April, Governor Philip Gidley King ordered a mobilisation of soldiers and decreed that no Aboriginal people be allowed to approach any British settlements.

In May, a punitive expedition conducted by the colonists captured Tedbury near Pennant Hills. Tedbury was forced to lead the British to the Dharug hide-out near North Rocks where they found stores of plundered corn. The Sydney Gazette reported that they also encountered Musquito and a small band there. Musquito called out to them "in good English" that he would continue his raids before running off. On 9 June 1805 the colonial authorities authorised the specific arrest of Musquito, whom they regarded as a key ringleader.

In that same month, the magistrate at Parramatta, Samuel Marsden, interrogated nine Aboriginal people who were being held in jail and compelled two of them to lead a group of armed colonists to secure Musquito. The other seven incarcerated Aboriginal people were retained in custody as hostages. Musquito was captured less than a week later in July 1805 and gaoled in Parramatta.

In response to the arrest of Musquito, Governor King revoked the orders banning Aboriginal people from the settlements and released Tedbury. Musquito and his compatriot Bull Dog attempted to escape his cell at Parramatta Gaol by loosening the stones in the wall. He was subsequently exiled in August 1805 to the convict colony on Norfolk Island with Bull Dog, also considered "principal" in the raiding and known to French explorers as Toulgra, although he was misnamed Ourou-Mare.

== Norfolk Island ==
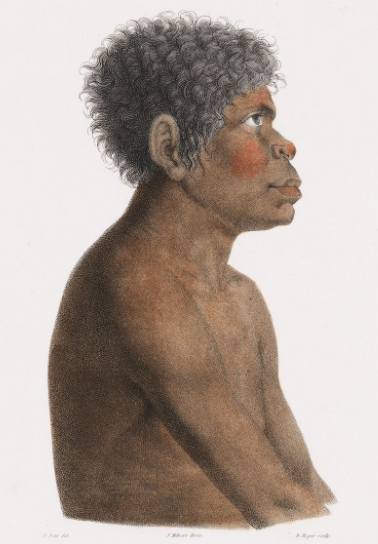
Ourou Marae (Bull Dog), who was transported with Musquito to Norfolk Island

The transportation of Musquito to Norfolk Island resulted in a long period of peace between the Aboriginal and settler populations around Sydney. With this diminishing of hostilities, Governor King proposed in 1806 to repatriate Musquito and Bull Dog back to Sydney, but this never occurred.

Musquito was banished to Norfolk Island at a time when, for financial reasons, it was slowly being decommissioned as a settlement, with its convicts and free settlers being gradually transferred to Van Diemen's Land. By 1810 there were only 26 convicts on the island, one of which was Musquito. Musquito spent around 8 years on the island as a convict, working as a charcoal burner.

As part of the evacuation from Norfolk Island, Musquito was sent in January 1813 on the ship Minstrel with other convicts to Port Dalrymple in northern Van Diemen's Land.

== Van Diemen's Land ==
On arriving in Van Diemen's Land, Musquito was legally a free man and in 1814, Musquito's brother Philip convinced Governor Lachlan Macquarie to allow Musquito to return to Sydney, but he remained in Van Diemen's Land.

Musquito worked for the colonial authorities as an Aboriginal tracker of bushrangers and runaway convicts. For his services, Musquito was promised repatriation to Sydney by Lieutenant-Governor William Sorell in 1817, but this did not occur.

By February 1818 he was a servant of the prominent and wealthy settler and entrepreneur, Edward Lord, and some sources say that in September 1818 he helped track down the bushranger Michael Howe.

Ostracised by the convicts, and disillusioned by Sorell's broken promise to return Musquito to Sydney, Musquito decided in 1819 to leave the settlement for the bush.

== Leader of "the tame mob" ==
Musquito joined "the tame mob" of around 30 to 60 Aboriginal people, who during that time peacefully coexisted with the British settlers. They travelled around southeastern Van Diemen's Land, accepted handouts of food and occasionally camping in Hobart. They included males and females disconnected from their traditional clans by colonisation and were mostly made up of 'Oyster Bay' and 'Big River' people from the central and eastern parts of the island. It also included a few Nuenonne people from Bruny Island, but as a whole "the tame mob" were regarded by the colonists as being part of the 'Oyster Bay tribe'.

Contemporaries such as Reverend William Horton, who conversed with Mosquito at Pitt Water (near Lewisham) in 1823, considered Musquito to have been the leader of this band. He was charismatic, and fluent in English.

== Conflict with the colonists ==
Musquito and his "tame mob" remained docile to the colonists until 1823 when conflict flared. By this stage, British expansion into Van Diemen's Land had increased significantly and "the tame mob" had been joined by more displaced Aboriginal people who were escaping death, abduction and violence at the hands of the settlers. In particular, Kikatapula, an 'Oyster Bay' man who joined "the tame mob" in 1822, harboured personal grievances against the colonists who he had lived with and worked for.

In November 1823, a band of Oyster Bay people, including Musquito and a man known as Black Jack, were camped at Grindstone Bay, which had been a favourite hunting ground for the 'Oyster Bay' people but was now part of Silas Gatehouse's Grindstone Bay sheep property. Musquito bartered with three stock keepers there and while the sole surviving white witness denied it, it seems the stock keepers engaged in sexual activity with the women. Many years later Kikatapula told George Augustus Robinson that one of the stock keepers shot a woman in the back. The Oyster Bay people retaliated and two of the stockmen were killed, while the other was severely wounded.

Gatehouse organised a mounted and armed punitive expedition which tracked down and dispersed the Oyster Bay mob near Swansea. By December though, they managed to regroup and raid a settler property at Mayfield Bay, setting fire to the house and killing a servant. They then raided farms at Cranbrook before retreating into the interior. In January 1824, the colonial government published a general notice naming Musquito and Black Jack as outlaws, ordering their arrest. However, soon after the declaration, a mob raided a farm near Bothwell killing a stockman before killing colonist Patrick McCarthy at his nearby Hollow Tree property. A two hundred Spanish dollar reward was then advertised for Musquito's capture.

Armed parties were sent out to capture Musquito but raids attributed to him or his associates continued, which resulted in another ten settlers being killed near Jericho, Tunbridge, Lower Marshes, Swansea, Stonehenge and Ouse.

== Capture and execution ==
In August 1824, Musquito was finally captured by a constable and an Aboriginal youth named Teague (or Tegg), who incapacitated Musquito by shooting him in the thigh and groin. Governor George Arthur promised Teague a boat as a reward but never delivered on it, resulting in an angered Teague joining the Aboriginal outlaws and dying soon after.

Musquito was charged with aiding and abetting the murder of a Tahitian farm hand named Mammoa and settler George Meredith's servant, William Hollyoak, at Grindstone Bay, and held in custody at Old Hobart Gaol. In November 1824, a group of 64 members of the 'Oyster Bay tribe' entered Hobart courageously to solicit Musquito's release. Although Governor Arthur was receptive to their entreaties and ordered some huts to be built at Kangaroo Point to accommodate them, Musquito remained incarcerated and the disappointed Oyster Bay people soon returned to the bush.

He was tried in December 1824 along with his comrade Black Jack who had also been captured. Musquito and Black Jack were both found guilty and sentenced to death by hanging. The sentence was carried out at Old Hobart Gaol on 25 February 1825.

Historian Naomi Parry describes the evidence arrayed against Musquito for aiding and abetting as "dubious" and says that after his death it "remained unclear whether Musquito committed any murders". Musquito's contemporary Henry Melville called the conviction a "most extraordinary precedent" and Gilbert Robertson said it provoked further violence. The execution of Musquito undoubtedly inflamed the remaining members of the "tame mob" and 'Oyster Bay tribe' who, now led by Kikatapula, quickly resumed hostilities against the invaders. This expanded into a bloody conflict of extermination that has become known as the Black War.

== See also ==
- Pemulwuy a warrior and resistance leader of the Bidjigal clan of the Eora people, in the area around Sydney
- Tarenorerer, also known as Walyer, Waloa or Walloa was a rebel leader of the Indigenous Australians in Tasmania
- Tunnerminnerwait was an Australian aboriginal resistance fighter and Parperloihener clansman from Tasmania
- Australian frontier wars
- List of Indigenous Australian historical figures
