= Gilbert Robertson =

(1794–1851) editor and agriculturist

- Born: 10 December 1794; Trinidad, West Indies
- Died: 5 September 1851 (aged 56); Geelong, Victoria

Gilbert Robertson (1794–1851) was a colonist and newspaper editor in Van Diemen's Land.

== Life ==
He was the son of Gilbert Robertson (1774–1840), a planter with large possessions in Demerara, by his enslaved mistress; or else the son of Gilbert's uncle, George Robertson (1756–1799).

He was raised and educated by a wealthy male relative in Scotland, from whence he emigrated to Van Diemen's Land as a free settler in 1822. In 1828 he led the first 'roving party' of armed settlers tasked with capturing hostile aboriginals in the context of the so-called Black War.

== Sources ==
- Godfrey, Margery (2006) [1967]. "Gilbert Robertson (1794–1851)". Australian Dictionary of Biography. Vol. 2 (online ed.). National Centre of Biography, Australian National University (Melbourne University Press).
- Pybus, Cassandra (2006). "Gilbert Robertson". The Companion to Tasmanian History (online ed.). Centre for Tasmanian Historical Studies.
- Pybus, C. (2003). "Robinson and Robertson". In Manne, R. (ed.). Whitewash. Melbourne.
- "George Robertson (1756–1799)". Centre for the Study of the Legacies of British Slavery. University College London.
- "Gilbert Robertson (1774–1840)". Centre for the Study of the Legacies of British Slavery. University College London.
