= Thomas Bock =

English-Australian artist (1790-1855)

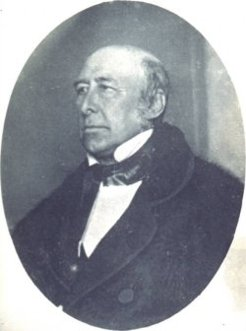
- Bock, by his son Alfred Bock, circa 1847.
- Born: 1790; Sutton Coldfield
- Died: 19 March 1855 (aged 64–65); Hobart
- Occupation: Engraver, artist, daguerreotypist (1847–1855)
- Children: William Bock

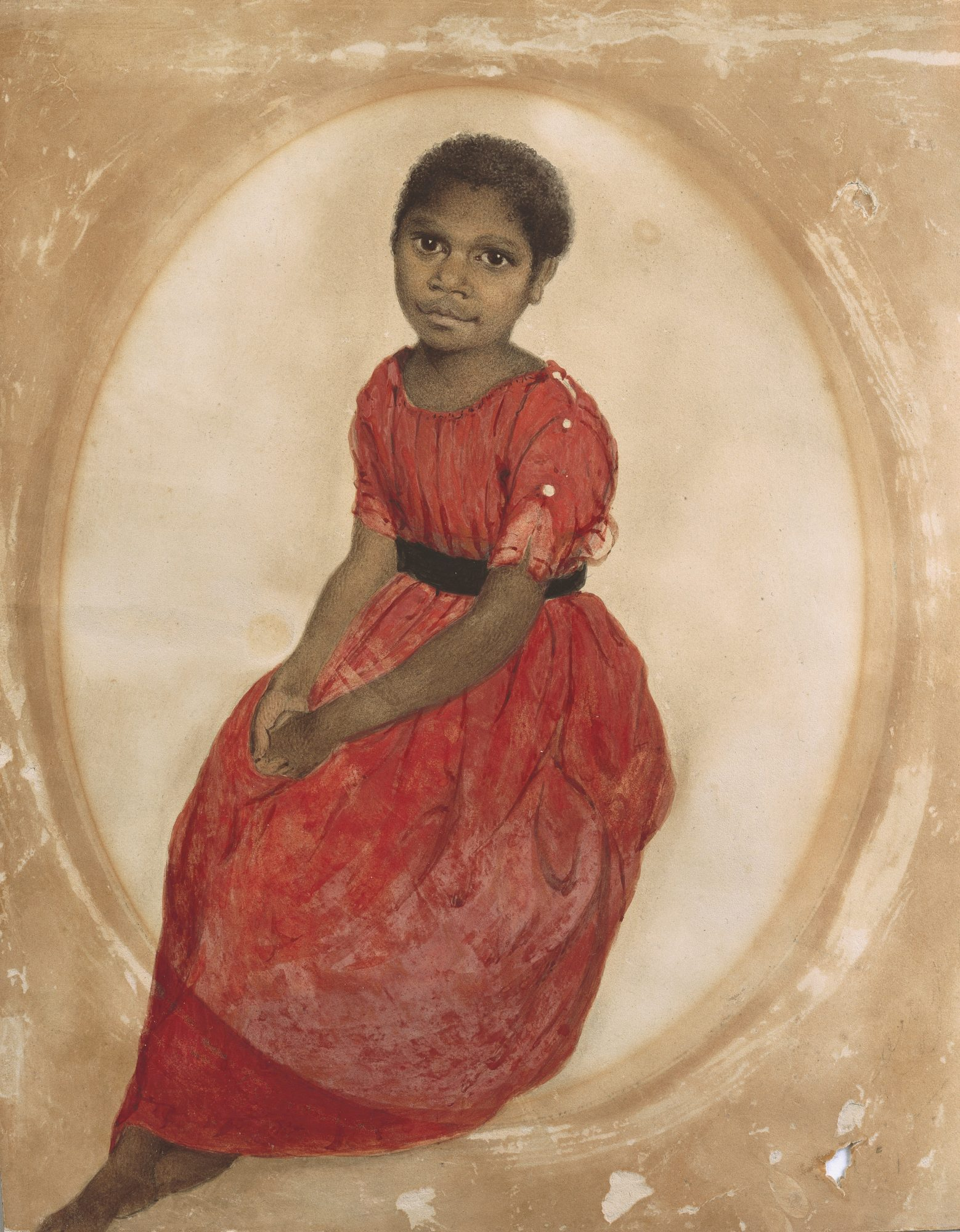
1842 watercolour of Mathinna, a Tasmanian Indigenous Australian girl

Thomas Bock was an English-Australian artist and an early adopter of photography in Australia. Born in England he was sentenced to transportation in 1823. After gaining his freedom he set himself up as one of Australia's first professional artists and became well known for his portraits of colonists. As early as 1843 he began taking daguerreotypes in Hobart and became one of the earliest commercial photographers in Australia.

== Early life ==
Bock was born in Sutton Coldfield (Note: Since 1974, Sutton Coldfield has been part of Birmingham), Warwickshire, England. In his early years he was a chorister at Lichfield Cathedral. Later Bock worked as an engraver at 24 Great Charles Street Birmingham, alongside William Wyon who later became an engraver for the British Mint. After finishing his apprenticeship he moved to London and established himself as an engraver and miniature painter. In 1817 Bock was awarded the silver medal of the Society of Arts and Commerce for an engraving of a portrait.

In April 1823, Bock was found guilty at the Warwick Assizes of administering drugs to a young woman (his mistress, whose fetus he wished to abort) and sentenced to transportation to Van Diemen's Land (now Tasmania), arriving in January 1824 aboard the Asia. He was set to work preparing plates for banknotes, and then to official assignments making portraits of recently executed criminals and engraved the plates for 1829, 1830 and 1835 Hobart Town Almanack's published by Dr James Ross.

== Career in Australia ==
Upon earning his freedom Bock set himself up as one of Australia's first professional artists and became well known for his portraits of colonists. He was also commissioned by Lady Jane Franklin, wife of Arctic explorer Sir John Franklin (at the time, the Lieutenant-Governor of Van Diemen's Land) to paint the portraits of some Tasmanian Aborigines. Bock's first studio was in Lower Liverpool Street, Hobart but he later moved to a house at No. 22 Campbell Street, and it was here he painted most of his portraits. In 1843 Bock visited Sydney but returned to exhibit at the first major art exhibition, which was held in Hobart in 1845.

Bock painted oils, water-colour, and crayons as well as working as one of Australia's first photographers. But according to Henry Allport, a close contemporary of Bock's, it was his crayon works which produced the happiest results as it was in this medium that he best captured the character of the sitter.

As early as October 1843 Bock was taking daguerreotypes in Hobart even though the licence to use the process in Australia was at this time held by George Baron Goodman. It seems Bock acquired a camera and associated apparatus and was producing portraits which, along with Goodman's, were among the earliest taken in Australia. Bock clearly maintained his interest in photography as in 1849 he was advertising that he had completed his arrangements for taking portrait daguerreotypes from his studio at 22 Campbell Street.

On 18 March 1855 Thomas Bock died aged 65. It appears for all his hard work Bock did not die a wealthy man as on 1 May 1855 an exhibition of his paintings and drawings was opened a R. L. Hood's Exhibition Room in Hobart in an effort to raise money for his widow and family.

Bock was one of the exhibitors at the first major art exhibition, in Hobart. His official work produced private commissions, and by the time of his death in Hobart, Tasmania, he was a successful portraitist specialising in miniatures. Bock was one of the most highly skilled of the early convict artists. Much of his apparently voluminous output remains lost, or at least unidentified, but he can be credited with two Australian "firsts": he left behind a small body of nude studies, rare in early colonial art; and he was one of the first in the colonies to experiment with daguerreotype photography.

== See also ==
- List of convicts transported to Australia
