= List of extinct languages of Oceania =

Language Endangerment Status by UNESCO Atlas of the World's Languages in Danger category

Extinct (EX)
- Extinct (EX): (lists)

Endangered
- Critically Endangered (CR); Severely Endangered (SE); Definitely Endangered (DE); Vulnerable (VU): (list); (list); (list); (list)

Safe
- Safe (NE): no list
- Other categories
- Revived (RE); Constructed (CL): (list); (list)
- Related topics: Atlas of the World's Languages in Danger; Endangered Languages Project; Ethnologue; Unclassified language; List of languages by total number of speakers
- UNESCO Atlas of the World's; Languages in Danger categories

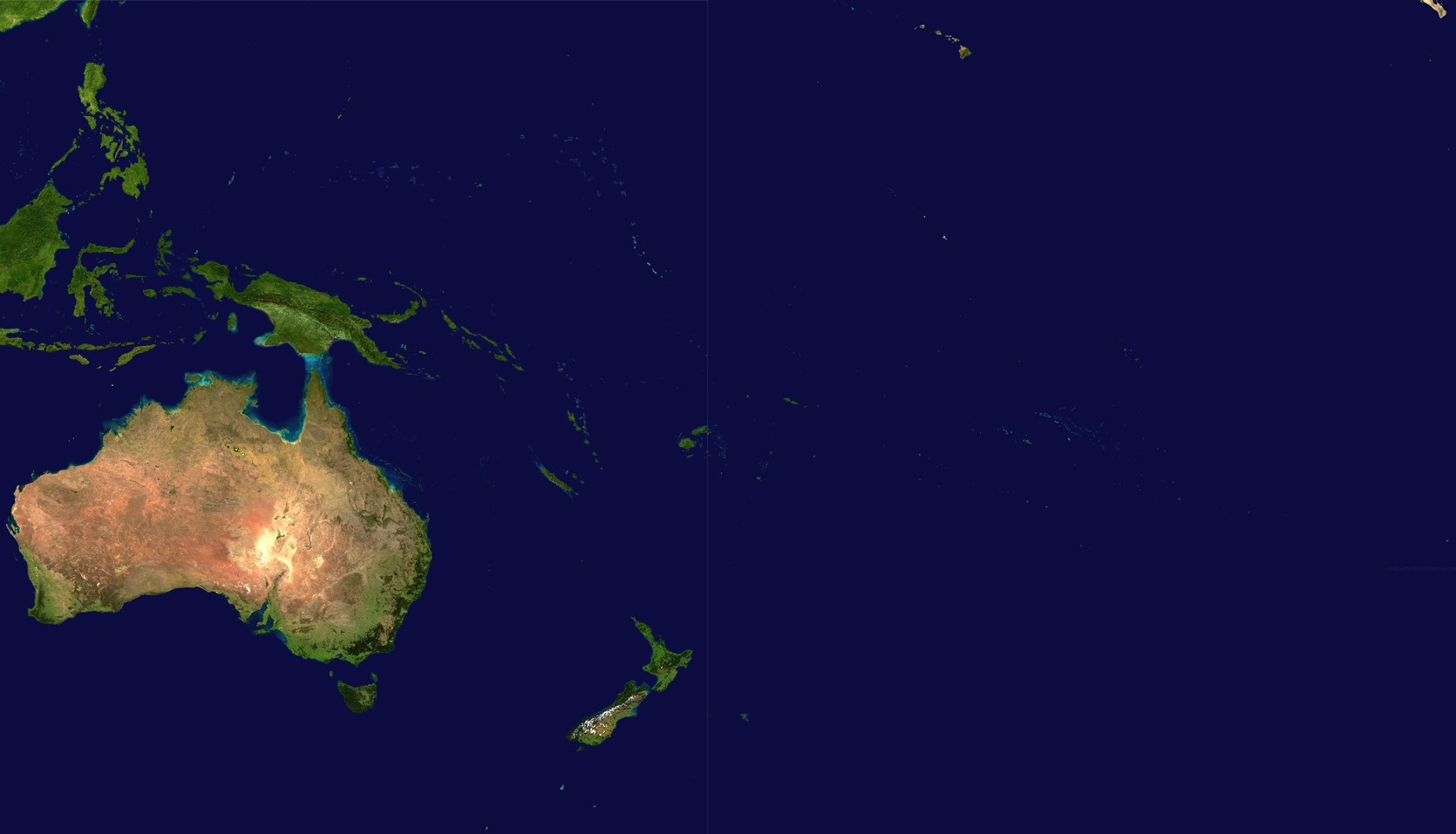

This article is a list of languages and dialects that have no native speakers, no spoken descendants, and that diverged from their parent language in Oceania. The languages listed are spoken in Australia, Hawaii, Kiribati, New Caledonia, New Zealand, Papua New Guinea, Samoa, the Solomon Islands,Tonga, and Western New Guinea.

== Australia ==
=== New South Wales ===
- Awabakal
- Barranbinja
- Darkinjung
- Dhanggati
- Dharug
- Dhurga
- Dyirringany
- Latji-Latji
- Ngarigo
- Ngunnawal
- Yugambal

=== Northern Territory ===
- Alenjerntarrpe
- Amurdak
- Andegerebinha
- Doolboong
- Gaagudju
- Giyug
- Gunbarlang
- Ilgar
- Kamu
- Kungarakany
- Limilngan
- Marrgu
- Matngala
- Ngalakgan
- Ngandi
- Ngomburr
- Nhangu
- Nungali
- Umbugarla
- Wagaya
- Wulna
- Wurrugu
- Yangman

=== Queensland ===
- Adithinngithigh
- Aghu Tharrnggala
- Alngith
- Arritinngithigh
- Ayabadhu
- Bidjara
- Bigambal
- Bindal
- Damin
- Dhangu-Djangu
- Dhungaloo
- Djinba
- Flinders Island
- Gkuthaarn
- Gubbi Gubbi
- Gudang
- Gugu Thaypan
- Kalali
- Kok-Nar
- Kukatj
- Mayi-Kutuna
- Mbabaram
- Mbara-Yanga
- Mbariman-Gudhinma
- Mbiywom
- Morrobolam
- Mpalityan
- Mutumui
- Ndra'ngith
- Ngawun
- Nyawaygi
- Pakanha
- Pirriya
- Pitta Pitta
- Umpithamu
- Uradhi
- Wakka Wakka
- Walangama
- Warluwarra
- Warrgamay
- Warrongo
- Wilson River
- Wulguru
- Yalarnnga
- Yandruwandha

(was also spoken in South Australia)

- Yir-Yoront

=== South Australia ===
- Antakarinya
- Barngarla
- Bungandidj

(was also spoken in Victoria)

- Diyari
- Kaurna
- Narungga
- Nauo
- Ngadjuri
- Ngamini
- Nukunu
- Pilatapa
- Warray

=== Tasmania ===
- Bruny Island Tasmanian
- Flinders Island lingua franca
- Lhotsky/Backhouse
- Little Swanport
- Norman
- Nuenonne
- Paredarerme
- Peerapper
- Port Sorell
- Pyemmairre
- Tommeginne
- Toogee
- Tyerrernotepanner

=== Victoria ===
- Barababaraba
- Bunurong
- Dhudhuroa
- Djabwurrung
- Gulidjan
- Pallanganmiddang
- Taungurung
- Wadawurrung
- Warrnambool
- Wemba Wemba
- Woiwurrung
- Yorta Yorta

=== Western Australia ===
- Burduna
- Djugun
- Galaagu
- Gambera
- Jabirr Jabirr
- Jawi
- Jiwarli
- Jurruru
- Malgana
- Martuthunira
- Mirning
- Ngadjunmaya
- Ngumbarl
- Nimanburru
- Nyulnyul
- Warrwa

== Hawaii ==
- Pidgin Hawaiian

== Kiribati ==
- Banaban

== New Caledonia ==
- Waamwang
- Zire

== New Zealand ==
- Maritime Polynesian Pidgin
- Moriori

== Papua New Guinea ==
- Aribwatsa
- Bina
- Butam
- Guramalum
- Hermit
- Kaniet
- Karami
- Laua
- Makolkol
- Mulaha
- Ouma
- Papuan Pidgin English
- Rema
- Sene
- Uruava
- Yoba

== Samoa ==
- Samoan Plantation Pidgin

== Solomon Islands ==
- Kazukuru
- Laghu
- Marau Wawa
- Rennellese Sign Language

== Tonga ==
- Niuatoputapu

== Vanuatu ==
- Aore
- Nethalp
- Olrat
- Sowa
- Utaha
- Volow

== Western New Guinea ==
- Air Matoa
- Duriankari
- Mapia
- Mawes
- Pidgin Onin
- Saponi
- Tandia

== See also ==
- Languages of Oceania
- List of endangered languages in Oceania
