= Port Sorell language =

Extinct aboriginal language of Tasmania

Port Sorell
- Port Sorell Tasmanian
- Region: North-central coast of Tasmania
- Ethnicity: Northern tribe of Tasmanians
- Extinct: 19th century
- Language family: Northern–Western Tasmanian?: Northern Tasmanian; Port Sorell

Language codes
- ISO 639-3: xpl
- Glottolog: port1278
- AIATSIS: T13

Port Sorell is an extinct aboriginal language of Tasmania in the reconstruction of Claire Bowern. It was spoken near Port Sorell, in the center of the north coast, just east of Northern Tasmanian proper. Dixon & Crowley (1981) agree that there is unlikely to be a close connection to other varieties of Tasmanian.

Port Sorell Tasmanian is attested from at least two word lists: One of 268 words collected by Charles Robinson (the son of George Augustus Robinson) at Port Sorell, and another of only 77 words, the "Little Jemmie’s" vocabulary collected by George Augustus Robinson.

Among the Robinson papers (call number A7085, item 6) held at the Mitchell Library, Sydney, there are 6 word lists of Port Sorell Tasmanian that were handwritten by Charles Robinson, with significant duplication; one of the lists is titled only as Larmuric (the informant's name). The Mitchell Library's A7085 manuscript set also has the following word lists that were handwritten by Charles Robinson, all of which are partly duplicated.

- Ben Lomond – 2 lists
- Big River – 3 lists
- West Coast – 2 lists
