= Norman Tasmanian language =

Extinct language of northeast Tasmania

"Norman"
- Region: Unidentified location in northeastern Tasmania
- Ethnicity: Unidentified tribe of Tasmanians
- Extinct: 19th century
- Language family: Northeastern Tasmanian: "Norman"

Language codes
- ISO 639-3: None (mis)
- Glottolog: None

A variety of aboriginal Tasmanian attested in a manuscript nicknamed the "Norman" vocabulary is identified as a distinct language in the reconstructions of Claire Bowern. The Norman vocabulary was originally compiled by Reverend James Norman of Sorell, Tasmania, and was apparently later copied by Charles Sterling. The list of 386 words was handwritten in Sorell, Tasmania in the 19th century by Charles Sterling, who was George Augustus Robinson's clerk from 1829 to 1832. The language was presumably spoken somewhere in the northeast of Tasmania, but the original location of the speakers was not recorded.

Plomley (1976) lists a few different versions of the '"Norman" vocabulary:

- ‘The Norman vocabulary’: manuscript in the archives of the Royal Society of Tasmania, now deposited with the University of Tasmania, Hobart.
- ‘The Norman vocabulary’: published by Edward Micklethwaite Curr in The Australian race, vol. 3, pp. 611-616 (1887).
- ‘The Norman vocabulary’: published by the Royal Society of Tasmania in its Papers and Proceedings, for 1910, pp. 333-342 (1911), with a commentary by H. B. Ritz (pp. 343-345).
