= Lhotsky/Backhouse Tasmanian language =

Extinct aboriginal Tasmanian language

(Lhotsky/Backhouse)
- Region: Unidentified location in northeastern Tasmania
- Ethnicity: Unidentified tribe of Tasmanians
- Extinct: 19th century
- Language family: Northeastern Tasmanian: (Lhotsky/Backhouse)

Language codes
- ISO 639-3: None (mis)
- Glottolog: None

"Lhotsky/Backhouse" is a label for an unnamed aboriginal Tasmanian language identified in the reconstructions of Claire Bowern. It was presumably spoken somewhere in the northeast of Tasmania, but the original location of the speakers was not recorded.

== Vocabulary ==
The name of the language was not recorded; "Lhotsky/Backhouse" is a label based on the names of people associated with various word lists. Bowern (2012), based on Plomley (1976), finds several word lists that attest to this previously unidentified language:

- the "eastern" list of Jorgen Jorgenson (first published in 1842, and later republished in 1846 by Thomas Henry Braim), 345 words
- a list of 68 words from the manuscripts of James Backhouse
- George Washington Walker, 148 words combined
- 105-word list of Alexander McGeary, published by John Lhotsky in 1839

The sources above are all listed and discussed in detail by Plomley (1976).

"Lhotsky/Backhouse" wordlists
gloss	Jorgenson
badger	publedina
bandicoot	padina
belly	miulean
blush	wadebeweanna
boat	luirapeuy
boy	plerenny
little boy	cuckana ludawinna
bread	towereela
breast	wagley
brother	pleragenana
cat	largana
chief	bungana
child	badany
chin	camena
come	tepera
covering	legunia
cow	cateena
crooked	powena
day	lanena
a day	magra
today	waldea-powt
fine day	lutregala
devil	comtena
drake	lamilbena
wild drake	malbena
dress	legunia
drink	lugana
dry	catrebuteany
ear	pelverata
earth	gunta
elbow	rowella
emu	rekuna
evacuate	legana
eye	lepena
fare	niparana
father	munlamana
feathers	munwaddia
fire	patarola
fist	trew
flying	pinega
fetus	leward
fog	muna
foot	langana
frog	pulbena
frost	ulta
girl	ludineny
little girl	cuckana ludineny
go on	tabelty!
good	naracoopa!
goose	robenganna
grass	rodidana
grass-tree	comthenana
ground	gunta
gull	rowenanna
gun	lila
hair	cethana
