= Toogee language =

Extinct aboriginal language of Tasmania

Toogee
- Southwestern Tasmanian
- Region: South-western coast of Tasmania
- Ethnicity: Toogee, Ninene
- Extinct: 19th century
- Language family: Northern–Western Tasmanian?: Western Tasmanian?; Toogee

Language codes
- ISO 639-3: xpx
- Glottolog: sout3391
- AIATSIS: T10

Southwestern Tasmanian, or Toogee, is a possible Aboriginal language of Tasmania. It is the most poorly attested known variety of Tasmanian, and it is not clear how distinct it was. It was apparently spoken along the west coast of the island, south of Macquarie Harbour.

Southwestern Tasmanian is attested from a single word list, collected in Port Davey by George Augustus Robinson from the Ninenee Tribe of the Bathurst Harbour area. There are 131 words, but some of these may be from Southeastern Tasmanian languages. The data are consistent with a Western Tasmanian language, but were not clean enough to allow classification by Bowern (2012); Dixon & Crowley (1981) had likewise left it alone.

== History ==
The Toogee were Tasmanian aborigines that lived in Western Tasmania, Australia, before European settlement. Their area of inhabitation included Macquarie Harbour. They consisted of two different bands, the Lowreenne and Mimegin. To the south, around Port Davey, were the Ninene people, also speaking Southwestern Tasmanian. These peoples made stone tools, including ones from Darwin Glass, which is a natural glass formed from a meteorite impact. The archeological record for this region goes back to 20,000 years, with relics found in Kuti Kina Cave. They also left behind middens of shells along the coast.
