= Toogee =

Toogee may refer to:

- Toogee people, an Aboriginal Tasmanian people
- Toogee language, a possible Aboriginal language of Tasmania
