= Northern Tasmanian languages =

Aboriginal languages of Northern Tasmania

Northern Tasmanian
- Geographic distribution: North-central coast of Tasmania
- Ethnicity: Northern tribe of Tasmanians
- Linguistic classification: Northern–Western Tasmanian?: Northern Tasmanian
- Subdivisions: Northern (Tommeginne) †; Port Sorell †

Language codes
- Glottolog: port1278
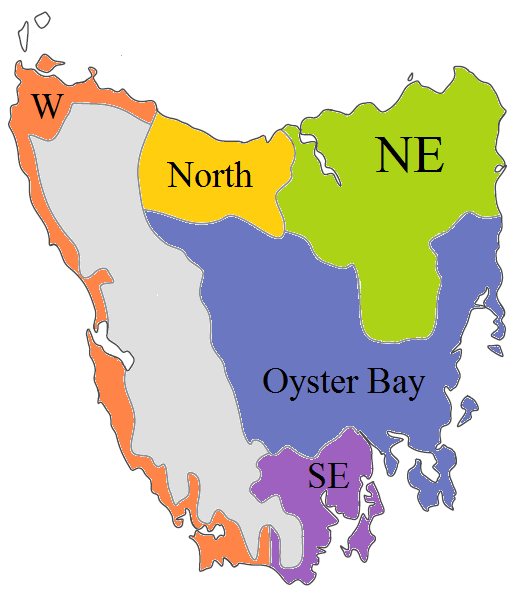
- Tasmanian language families per Bowern (2012). Northern Tasmanian

Northern Tasmanian is an aboriginal language family of Tasmania in the reconstruction of Claire Bowern.

== Languages ==
Bayesian phylogenetic analysis suggests (at either p < 0.15 or p < 0.20) that two Northern Tasmanian languages (the Northern Tasmanian language and the Port Sorell language) are recorded in the 26 unmixed Tasmanian word lists (out of 35 lists known). Bayesian analysis does not support a connection to other Tasmanian languages. However, manual comparison suggests they are related to the Western Tasmanian languages, which are especially poorly attested, though the similarities may be due to loans.
