= Oceanian languages =

Oceanian languages may refer to:

- Oceanic languages, a family of Austronesian languages spoken in Polynesia, Melanesia, and Micronesia
- Languages of Oceania, a list of languages spoken in Oceania
