= Pterostylis ziegeleri =

Cape Portland greenhood

Conservation status
- Vulnerable (EPBC Act)

Scientific classification
- Kingdom: Plantae
- Clade: Tracheophytes
- Clade: Angiosperms
- Clade: Monocots
- Order: Asparagales
- Family: Orchidaceae
- Subfamily: Orchidoideae
- Tribe: Cranichideae
- Genus: Pterostylis
- Species: P. ziegeleri

Binomial name
- Pterostylis ziegeleri D.L.Jones

Synonyms
- Hymenochilus ziegeleri (D.L.Jones) D.L.Jones & M.A.Clem.; Oligochaetochilus ziegeleri (D.L.Jones) Szlach.

Species of orchid

Pterostylis ziegeleri, commonly known as Cape Portland greenhood, is a plant in the orchid family Orchidaceae and is endemic to Tasmania. Both flowering and non-flowering plants have a rosette of leaves lying flat on the ground and flowering plants have up to eight crowded translucent, pale green flowers with darker green veins.

== Description ==
Pterostylis ziegeleri, is a terrestrial, perennial, deciduous, herb with an underground tuber. It has a rosette of between four and seven, lance-shaped to egg-shaped leaves, each leaf 12–20 mm (0.5–0.8 in) long and 5–10 mm (0.2–0.4 in) wide, lying flat on the ground. Between three and eight translucent pale green flowers with darker green lines are crowded together on a flowering spike 50–100 mm (2–4 in) high with three to six, often overlapping stem leaves. The flowers are about 5–7 mm (0.2–0.3 in) long and 3–4 mm (0.1–0.2 in) wide with the dorsal sepal and petals joined to form a hood called the "galea" over the column. The dorsal sepal is gently curved but suddenly curves downward near the tip and is about the same length as the petals. The lateral sepals turn downwards and are about 5 mm (0.2 in) long and wide, fused together for most of their length and cup-shaped with their tips less than 1 mm (0.04 in) apart. The labellum is about 1 mm (0.04 in) long and wide and whitish-green with a dark green, appendage. Flowering occurs in October and November.

== Taxonomy and naming ==
Pterostylis ziegeleri was first formally described in 1998 by David Jones from a specimen collected near Cape Portland and the description was published in Australian Orchid Research. The specific epithet (ziegeleri) honours David Ziegler "who prepared the initial manuscript of the Orchid Atlas of Tasmania.

== Distribution and habitat ==
Cape Portland greenhood grows in dense, tall, tussock grassland in coastal areas and in the midlands.

== Conservation ==
Pterostylis ziegeleri is listed as "vulnerable" under the Australian Government Environment Protection and Biodiversity Conservation Act 1999 and the Tasmanian Government Threatened Species Protection Act 1995. The main threats to the species are land clearing for agriculture or development, application of fertilisers and inappropriate fire or grazing/slashing regimes.
