= Lia Pootah =

Tasmanian ethnic group

The Lia Pootah are a Tasmanian group who claim descent from both Tasmanian Aboriginal women of several kinship groups and European men (free settlers, soldiers and convicts) who arrived in Van Diemen's Land from 1803 onwards. They are distinct from the Palawa, a group of Aboriginal descent whose immediate ancestors hail mostly from the islands of Bass Strait.

== Origins ==
The Lia Pootah claim a connection with two main groups, the people of the Waddamanna (big rivers) and the people of the Huon. These kinship groups are defined as Teen Toomele Menennye (Big River) and Tahune Linah (Huon) respectively. Some of the Lia Pootah claim to be descended from the people of Bruny Island and from the Toogee of Tasmania’s West Coast. Others claim an origin on the East Coast and in the Central Highlands.

The Lia Pootah say that it is inaccurate to claim (as some historians have done) that all Aboriginal people were removed from the Tasmanian mainland in the nineteenth century. They maintain that many people of full or part Aboriginal descent remained in Tasmania, particularly in remote areas, given that much of Tasmania was inaccessible to European settlers as late as the 1870s.

== Cultural activities ==
The cultural arm of the Lia Pootah community is Manuta Tunapee Puggaluggalia (Tasmanian Aboriginal Historical Cultural Association and Publishing House). Its stated aim is to educate and break down the stereotypes and misconceptions which now prevail within both the Tasmanian community and the broader community. It says that the broader community is unaware that there are a number of separate Aboriginal communities in Tasmania, which have their own policies and guidelines and publish their own material. It has therefore made available cultural books, teaching resources, and other material, including children's books.

== Recognition ==
The Lia Pootah maintain that the definition of Tasmanian Aboriginality has been monopolised by a separate group known as the Palawa, represented by the Tasmanian Aboriginal Centre (TAC) and with three accepted lines of ancestry - Bass Strait Islands, Dolly Dalrymple and Fanny Cochrane Smith. This, they argue, has had the effect of excluding the Lia Pootah from government recognition and from full involvement in Aboriginal affairs. The Palawa leader most strongly opposed to Lia Pootah claims to Aboriginality is lawyer and activist Michael Mansell, one of the founders of the TAC.

== See also ==
- Aboriginal Tasmanian
- Palawa kani
