= Eastern Tasmanian languages =

Language family of Tasmania

Eastern Tasmanian
- Oyster Bay – Bruny
- Geographic distribution: Eastern coast of Tasmania and interior
- Ethnicity: Oyster Bay, Big River, and Bruny tribes of Tasmanians
- Extinct: 19th century
- Linguistic classification: Possibly one of the world's primary language families (see Tasmanian languages)
- Subdivisions: Oyster Bay †; Bruny (Southeast) †

Language codes
- Glottolog: oyst1235 Oyster Bay sout1293 Bruny/Southeast
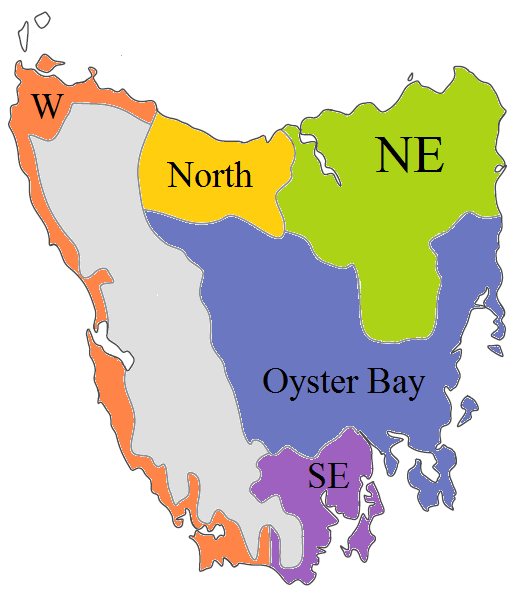
- Eastern Tasmanian language families per Bowern (2012) Oyster Bay Southeast Tasmanian

Eastern Tasmanian is an Aboriginal language family of Tasmania in the reconstructed classification of Claire Bowern.

== Languages ==
Bayesian phylogenetic analysis suggests that four (at p < 0.20) to five (at p < 0.15) Eastern Tasmanian languages are recorded in the 26 unmixed Tasmanian word lists (out of 35 lists known). These cannot be shown to be related to other Tasmanian languages based on existing evidence. The languages are:

- Eastern Tasmanian
  - Oyster Bay (Central–Eastern Tasmanian) (2)
    - Oyster Bay (Oyster Bay and Big River tribes)
    - Little Swanport
  - Bruny (Southeastern Tasmanian) (2–3, Bruny tribe)
    - Southeast Tasmanian
    - Bruny Island

Two of the lists reported to be from Oyster Bay contain substantial Northeastern admixture (see Northeastern Tasmanian languages), which Bowern believes to be responsible for several classifications linking the languages of the east coast. However, once that admixture is accounted for, the apparent links disappear.

== Phonology ==
The phonology is uncertain, due to the poor nature of the transcriptions. Wilhelm Schmidt reconstructed the following for East-central and South-east Tasmanian, with additional work by Crowley and Dixon.

=== Consonants ===
| | | Labial | | Coronal | | | Velar | | Glottal |
| | | plain | palatalized | dental | plain | palatalized | plain | palatalized | Glottal |
|---|---|---|---|---|---|---|---|---|---|
| Stop | | p/b | pʲ/bʲ | t̪/d̪ | t/d | tʲ/dʲ | k/ɡ | kʲ/ɡʲ | (ʔ) |
| Fricative | | | | | | | (x/ɣ) | | |
| Nasal | | m | mʲ | (n̪) | n | nʲ | ŋ | | |
| Tap / Trill | | | | | r | rʲ | | | |
| Approximant | median | w | | | ɹ | ɹʲ | | j | |
| Approximant | lateral | | | | l | lʲ | | | |

Plosives were conditionally voiced in the interior of a word.

There is no evidence of a lamino-dental nasal, but for people who do not have this contrast in their native language, this phoneme is difficult to distinguish from an alveolar nasal. However, both Crowley & Dixon (1981) and Schmidt (1952) note a possible [n̪].

There may have been a glottal stop.

There is evidence of two rhotic consonants, like almost all languages from the Australian mainland. One flapped or trilled /r/ and a frictionless continuant /ɹ/. Dixon and Crowley come to the conclusion that where there is alternation in each source for the same word between r, w and l this consonant was /ɹ/, where there is alternation between r and the sequences dr or rr this consonant was /r/.

Milligan mentions two velar fricatives, transcribing them as ch and gh. These appear to have been uncommon, and were probably allophones of /k/ or [g] occurring mainly before /r/ and also before /l/ or /w/.

=== Vowels ===
There were certainly at least three vowels, /a/, /i/ and /u/. There may have been more, and there may have been variation among the languages. Schmidt (1952) noted five short /a e i o u/, and five long vowels /aː eː iː oː uː/, and nasal vowels such as "[ʌ̃]" in French pronunciations. It is possible that any additional vowels that have been recorded were allophones of the three vowels.

/a/ appears as [o] most frequently next to labial or dorsal consonants, and as [e] most frequently next to laminal or apical consonants. There is also evidence for alternation between /u/ with [o], and between /i/ with [e].

There is evidence of a central vowel [ə] occurring as an allophone of these three vowels /a/, /i/ and /u/ in unstressed positions, in some languages.

Open vowels [æ] and [ɑ] are mentioned only in Milligan's vocabulary and they are almost certainly allophones of /a/. Milligan and the records of French maritime explorers are the only observers to record an ü. It is likely that this ü was an allophone of /u/ in some conditions.

It is difficult to tell if vowel length was distinctive. One recorder may have used a spelling which implied that there was a long vowel in a certain word, while another recorder for the same word may use a spelling that suggests a short vowel. This is further diluted by some of the recorders using English spelling conventions. Crowley & Dixon (1981) come to the conclusion that vowel length was likely not phonologically significant.

=== Phonotactics and stress ===
All words began with a consonant. This initial consonant appears to have been any consonant including /ŋ/, /l/ or /r/. There may have been initial consonant clusters such as pr and kr, similar to the language of Gippsland nearest Tasmania, Gunai, that has words beginning with trilled r and the clusters br and gr. Blench (2008) notes, however, that some supposed Tasmanian speakers may actually have been from southeastern (mainland) Australia.

Word internal clusters were fairly common. Word final consonants were very rare but somewhat less rare in the western languages.

All words were minimally disyllabic and stress appears to have been on the penultimate syllable.

== Grammar ==
East-Central Tasmanian (Oyster Bay) is used for illustration unless otherwise indicated.

Nouns

There is no evidence of plurality or gender. The nominal particle may have marked the end of a noun phrase.

| | Eastern Tasmanian | Western Tasmanian |
|---|---|---|
| woman | lowa-na | nowa-leā |
| hand | rī-na | ri-leā |
| kangaroo | tara-na | tara-leā |

Possession was indicated by the possessor (noun) dropping the nominal particle:

wurrawa lowa-na 'the wife of the deceased'

Postpositions

Postpositions, or perhaps case endings, include le/li 'behind', ra 'without', to/ta (change in direction):

There is also an adverbial suffix -re in lene-re 'backwards'.

lunamea ta 'to my house', nee-to [nito] 'to you'

Adjectives

Adjectives follow the noun, and some end in -ne (pāwine 'small') or -ak (mawbak 'black', tunak 'cold').

Pronouns

Only singular personal pronouns are known: mī-na 'I', nī-na 'you', nara 's/he'. (In Northeast Tasmanian, these are mi-na, ni-na, nara.) These form possessive suffixes: loa-mi 'my woman'. Pronouns might be incorporated in the verb: tiena-mia-pe 'give me!'.

Demonstrative pronouns are wa/we 'this' and ni/ne 'that': Riena narra wa 'this is my hand'.

Numerals

marra(wa) 'one', pʲa(wa) 'two'.

Verbs

The negative particle is noia.

noia meahteang meena neeto linah
'I won't give you any water'
(not give I to-you water)

In Southeast Tasmanian, suffixes -gara/-gera and -gana/-gena appear on verbs. Their meaning is unknown:

nunug(e)ra 'to wash', tiagarra 'to keep', nugara 'to drink'
longana 'to sleep', poenghana 'to laugh', winganah 'to touch'

== Descendants ==
The Flinders Island lingua franca was based primarily on Eastern and Northeastern Tasmanian languages. The English-based Bass Strait Pidgin continued some vocabulary from the lingua franca. The constructed language Palawa kani is based on many of the same languages as the lingua franca.
