= Tasmanian Aboriginal Centre =

Human rights organisation in Tasmania

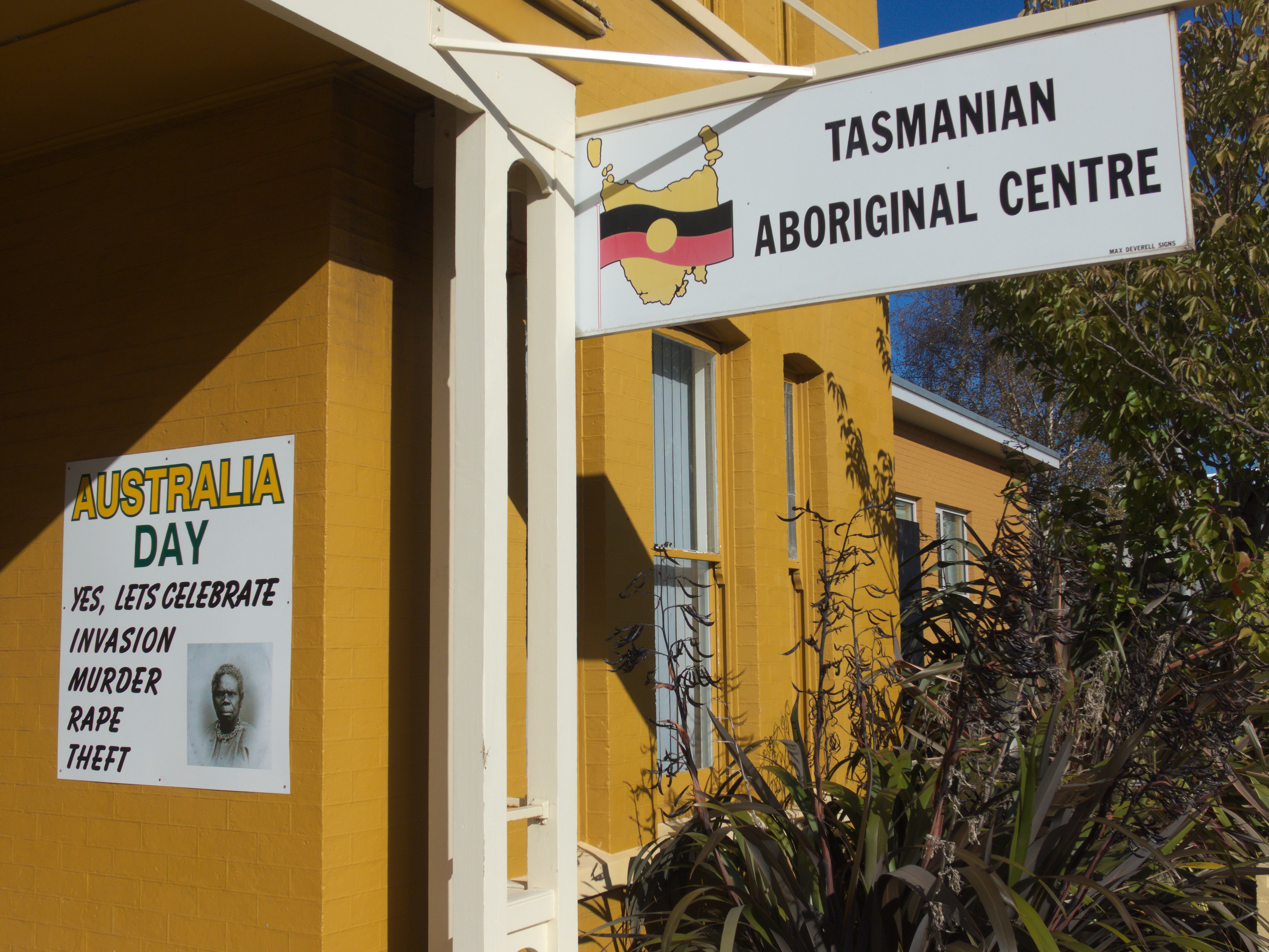
TAC office in Burnie in 2014

The Tasmanian Aboriginal Centre (TAC) is a human-rights and cultural organisation for Aboriginal Tasmanians. It was originally founded as the Tasmanian Information Centre in 1973 and has campaigned on land return, Aboriginal identity and return of stolen remains.

== Language revival ==
The Tasmanian languages were decimated after the British colonisation of Tasmania and the Black War. The last native speaker of any of the languages, Fanny Cochrane Smith, died in 1905.

In 1972, Robert M. W. Dixon and Terry Crowley investigated reconstructing the Tasmanian languages from existing records, in a project funded by the Australian Institute of Aboriginal Studies. This included interviewing two granddaughters of Fanny Cochrane Smith, who provided "five words, one sentence, and a short song". They were able to find "virtually no data on the grammar and no running texts" and stated "it is impossible to say very much of linguistic interest about the Tasmanian languages", and they did not proceed with the project.

In the late twentieth century, as part of community efforts to retrieve as much of the original Tasmanian culture as possible, the Tasmanian Aboriginal Centre attempted to reconstruct a language for the indigenous community. Due to the scarcity of records, palawa kani was constructed as a composite of several of the estimated dozen original Tasmanian languages.

== Repatriation of remains ==
The centre has campaigned for the return of remains of Tasmanian Aboriginal people that were sent abroad, such as those sent to the British Museum.

== Removal of statue ==
In 2022 Nala Mansell, a campaign coordinator for the centre, called for the removal of a statue of William Crowther from Franklin Square in Hobart. Crowther, a surgeon and former Premier of Tasmania is primarily known for his actions surrounding the theft, decapitation and mutilation of the body of the last full-blooded Tasmanian Aboriginal man, William Lanne in 1869.

== Dispute over identity ==
A dispute exists within the Tasmanian Aboriginal community, however, over what constitutes Aboriginality. The Palawa, mainly descendants of white male sealers and Tasmanian Aboriginal women who settled on the Bass Strait Islands, were given the power to decide who is of Tasmanian Aboriginal descent at the state level (entitlement to government Aboriginal services). Palawa recognise only descendants of the Bass Strait Island community as Aboriginal and do not consider as Aboriginal the Lia Pootah, who claim descent, based on oral traditions, from Tasmanian mainland Aboriginal communities. The Lia Pootah feel that the Palawa controlled Tasmanian Aboriginal Centre does not represent them politically.

Since 2007 there have been initiatives to introduce DNA testing to establish family history in descendant subgroups. This is strongly opposed by the Palawa and has drawn an angry reaction from some quarters, as some have claimed "spiritual connection" with Aboriginality distinct from, but not as important as the existence of a genetic link. The Lia Pootah object to the current test used to prove Aboriginality as they believe it favours the Palawa, a DNA test would circumvent barriers to Lia Pootah recognition, or disprove their claims to Aboriginality.

In April 2000, the Tasmanian Government Legislative Council Select Committee on Aboriginal Lands discussed the difficulty of determining Aboriginality based on oral traditions. An example given by Prof. Cassandra Pybus was the claim by the Huon and Channel Aboriginal people who had an oral history of descent from two Aboriginal women. Research found that both were non-Aboriginal convict women.
