= Palawa kani =

Constructed Tasmanian language

palawa kani
- Created by: Tasmanian Aboriginal Centre
- Date: 1992
- Setting and usage: Tasmania
- Ethnicity: Aboriginal Tasmanians
- Users: 251-500 (2018)
- Purpose: Constructed language: Zonal auxiliary language; A posteriori language; palawa kani
- Writing system: Latin alphabet
- Sources: Oral tradition and fragments from the 8 to 16 Tasmanian languages recorded by early Europeans.

Language codes
- ISO 639-3: None (qpa unofficial)
- Glottolog: pala1356
- AIATSIS: T16
- ELP: Palawa Kani
- IETF: art-x-palawa (unofficial)

Palawa kani is a constructed language created by the Tasmanian Aboriginal Centre as a composite Tasmanian language, based on reconstructed vocabulary from the limited accounts of the various languages once spoken by the Aboriginal people of what is now Tasmania (palawa kani: Lutruwita).

The centre wishes to restrict the availability of the language until it is established in the Aboriginal Tasmanian community and claims copyright. The United Nations Declaration on the Rights of Indigenous Peoples (UNDRIP) is used to support this claim to copyright as it declares that indigenous people have the right to control their "cultural heritage, traditional knowledge, and traditional cultural expressions" and that states must "recognise and protect the exercise of these rights". However, the declaration is legally non-binding and languages cannot receive copyright protection in many countries, including Australia and the United States. The centre however provides a list of place names in palawa kani and consents to their free use by the public. Dictionaries and other copyrightable resources for learning the language are only provided to the Aboriginal community.

== Background ==
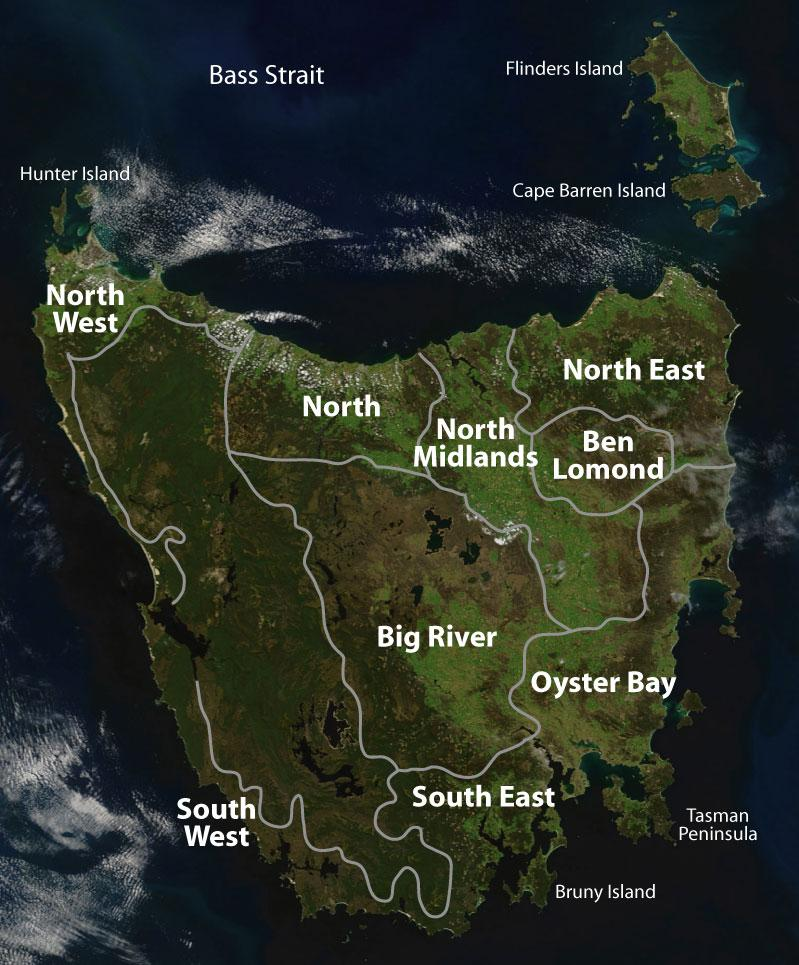
Map showing the approximate ethnic divisions in pre-European Tasmania.

The Tasmanian languages were exterminated after the British colonisation of Tasmania and the Black War. The last native speaker of any of the languages, Fanny Cochrane Smith, died in 1905.

In 1972, Robert M. W. Dixon and Terry Crowley investigated reconstructing the Tasmanian languages from existing records, in a project funded by the Australian Institute of Aboriginal Studies. This included interviewing two granddaughters of Fanny Cochrane Smith, who provided "five words, one sentence, and a short song". They were able to find "virtually no data on the grammar and no running texts" and stated "it is impossible to say very much of linguistic interest about the Tasmanian languages", and they did not proceed with the project.

In the late twentieth century, as part of community efforts to retrieve as much of the original Tasmanian culture as possible, the Tasmanian Aboriginal Centre attempted to reconstruct a language for the indigenous community. Due to the scarcity of records, palawa kani was constructed as a composite of several of the estimated dozen original Tasmanian languages.

== Sources ==
The two primary sources of lexical and linguistic material are Brian Plomley's 1976 word lists and Crowley and Dixon's 1981 chapter on Tasmanian. These are supplemented by archival research. The source languages are those of the Northeastern Tasmanian and Eastern Tasmanian language families, as these are ancestral to the modern palawa population as well as being the best attested Tasmanian languages. However, most place names are reconstructed using languages spoken around the locality as sources. Usually a single Tasmanian word is chosen for an English concept, but occasional duplicates occur, such as palawa and pakana, which come from different languages and both mean '(Tasmanian) person'.

The words need to be reconstructed from the English pronunciation spellings that they were recorded in. For example, in 1830 the local name for Hobart was recorded as nib.ber.loon.ne and niberlooner. Allowing for the distortions that occurred when linguistically untrained Europeans tried recording Tasmanian words, the centre reconstructs the name as nipaluna.

== State of the language ==
The Tasmanian Aboriginal Centre began developing palawa kani in the 1990s, with key leaders of the process including Theresa Sainty, Jenny Longey and June Sculthorpe. The centre wishes to maintain control over the language until the Aboriginal community is familiar and competent with it.

The language is only taught by community organisations and not by state schools. Since the language was constructed, an increasing number of people are able to use the language to some extent, some to great fluency. However, the centre requests that non-Aboriginals wanting to use the language first make a formal application to the centre. The centre rejects the classification of a "constructed language" for palawa kani. In 2012, the centre filed a request to remove the Wikipedia articles on this language on copyright grounds. However, this was refused.

The animated television series Little J & Big Cuz was the first television show to feature an episode entirely in palawa kani, which was broadcast on the NITV network in 2017. In 2018, The Nightingale became the first major film to feature palawa kani, with consultation from Aboriginal Tasmanian leaders. In addition, palawa kani is used on a number of signs in protected areas of Tasmania, for example kunanyi has been gazetted as an official name for Mount Wellington, and what was formerly known as Asbestos Range National Park is now known as Narawntapu National Park.

=== Official place names ===
The Tasmanian governmental Aboriginal and Dual Naming Policy of 2013 has formally legitimated palawa kani, allowing for "an Aboriginal and an introduced name to be used together as the official name and for new landmarks to be named according to their Aboriginal heritage". These include kanamaluka / Tamar River and kunanyi / Mount Wellington. Where no historical recorded name can be found, the policy allows for newly created names to be recognised as official. A number of other palawa kani place names exist, but are not in official use.

At the end of 2024 the Tasmanian Aboriginal Centre (TAC) requested the Tasmanian government change thirteen gazetted Aboriginal place names written in the reconstructed palawa kani language, with the change being having the first letter changed from lower-case to upper-case. A palawa kani language coordinator said this was a result of the evolution of the use of the language in the community with most Aboriginal people now using this format, and the lower-case to upper-case change mirrored changes in some mainland Aboriginal languages. Some of the thirteen Aboriginal place names were Kunanyi/Mt Wellington, Takayna/Tarkine, Yingina/Great Lake and Truwana/Cape Barren Island. The Tasmanian Aboriginal Centre (TAC) website states that 'initial capital letters for place names are now standard practice' and their interactive map has over 200 places names with an upper-case first letter. The Department of Natural Resources and Environment Tasmania also has changed the 44 Aboriginal and dual names as having an upper-case first letter.

== Phonology ==
In the following table, the IPA is first listed. The orthography is listed ⟨in angle brackets⟩ if it differs from the IPA.

=== Vowels ===
The vowels are /a/, /i/, /u/ and the diphthongs /ei/ ⟨ay⟩ and /oi/ ⟨uy⟩.

=== Consonants ===
		Labial	Coronal			Velar	
		plain	dental	plain	palatalized	palatalized	plain
Stop		p	t̪ ⟨th⟩	t	tʲ ⟨ty⟩		k
Nasal		m		n	nʲ ⟨ny⟩		ŋ ⟨ng⟩
Sonorant	median	w		r/ɹ ⟨rr/r⟩		j ⟨y⟩	
Sonorant	lateral			l	lʲ ⟨ly⟩		

Consonant clusters include pr, tr and kr.

Like most mainland languages, Tasmanian languages lacked sibilants (which is apparent in the aboriginal pronunciation of English words like sugar, where the 's' was replaced with a t in pidgin English), and this is reflected in palawa kani.

The pronunciation of palawa kani may reflect those words preserved in the now English-speaking palawa community, but does not reflect how the original Tasmanian words were likely to have been pronounced. Taylor (2006) states that "the persons who contributed to the project would appear to have uncritically accepted phonological features of the Australian Mainland languages as a guide to palawa phonology without undertaking an adequate comparative analysis of the orthographies used by the European recorders", and gives three examples:

- In transcriptions with consonant + 'y', the 'y' is taken to be the vowel i or ay despite Milligan's statement that it was a 'y'-like sound (~/ɪ/). In word-final position, 'y' did not indicate a vowel, as palawa kani assumes, but rather forms a digraph for one of the consonants ty (/tʲ/), ny, ly, etc.
- The sequence 'tr' is treated as a consonant cluster, when it was presumably a postalveolar affricate closer to English j (/d͡ʒ/) or ch (/t͡ʃ/).
- 'r' transcribed before a consonant or at the end of a word is taken to indicate a long vowel or the kind of vowel quality found in modern Australian English words with such spellings, but the English-speaking transcribers of Tasmanian spoke rhotic dialects of English, while others spoke Danish or French, and apparently the r's were to be pronounced. 'r' transcribed before a consonant is likely to have been part of a digraph for a retroflex consonant, such as "rl" (/ɭ/) or "rn" (/ɳ/).

== Orthography ==
The Tasmanian Aboriginal Centre has decided that palawa kani should only be written in lowercase letters. Initial capital letters may be used for names of places and people and "family/Ancestral collectives".

== Grammar ==
Nouns do not have number, and verbs do not indicate person or tense, e.g. waranta takara milaythina nara takara 'we walk where (place) they walked'.

In the early stages of the palawa kani project, it was assumed that virtually no grammatical information had been preserved from the original Tasmanian languages, and that palawa kani would have to draw heavily on grammatical features of English. Since then, more thorough analysis by the Tasmanian Aboriginal Centre of words and sentences collected in wordlists of the Tasmanian languages have provided evidence of word orders differing from English, loanwords, adaptation of words to talk about introduced concepts, and suffixes. These grammatical and vocabulary features have been incorporated into palawa kani.

The only running text recorded for the original Tasmanian languages is a sermon preached by George Robinson on Bruny Island in 1829, after being on the island for only eight weeks. His "Tasmanian" was actually English replaced word-for-word with Tasmanian words that had been stripped of their grammar, much as occurs in a contact pidgin. Robinson is one of the principal primary sources for palawa kani.

=== Pronouns ===
There are two sets of pronouns,

Subject/object
	sg	pl
1	mina	waranta
2	nina	nina-mapali
3	nara	nara-mapali

The second- and third-person plural pronouns are formed by adding mapali ("many") to the respective singular pronouns; no second- or third-person plural pronouns are attested in the known documentation of the original Tasmanian languages.

Possessive
	sg	pl
1	mana	mana
2	nanya	mana
3	nanya	nika

mapali 'many' may be used to distinguish mana 'my' from mana-mapali 'our, your'.

nika also means 'this', as in milaythina nika 'their lands / this land'.

=== Numbers ===
The numerals are,

	1	2	3	4	5	6	7	8	9
x1	pama	paya	luwa	wulya	mara	nana	tura	pula	tali
x10	kati	payaka	luwaka	*wulyaka	*maraka	*nanaka	*turaka	*pulaka	*talika
x100	pamaki	*payaki	*luwaki	*wulyaki	maraki	*nanaki	*turaki	*pulaki	*taliki
x1000	pamaku	*payaku	*luwaku	*wulyaku	*maraku	*nanaku	*turaku	*pulaku	taliku

For teens, single-digit numbers are conjoined to kati for pamakati 11, payakati 12, etc.

For tens, -ka is added to the digit, for payaka 20, luwaka 30, etc. For the hundreds and thousands, -ki and -ku are added, for pamaki 100, maraki 500, pamaku 1000, taliku 9000, etc.

== Sample text ==
This sample is a eulogy by the Tasmanian Aboriginal Centre Language Program first used at the 2004 anniversary of the Risdon Cove massacre of 1804.

ya pulingina milaythina mana-mapali-tu	Greetings to all of you here on our land
mumirimina laykara milaythina mulaka tara	It was here that the Mumirima people (Note: People from country around Pittwater and Risdon.) hunted kangaroo all over their lands
raytji mulaka mumirimina	It was here that the white men (Note: raytji.) hunted the Mumirimina
mumirimina-mapali krakapaka laykara	Many Mumirimina died as they ran
krakapaka milaythina nika-ta	Died here on their lands
waranta takara milaythina nara takara	We walk where they once walked
waranta putiya nayri	And their absence saddens us
nara laymi krakapaka waranta-tu manta waranta tunapri nara.	But they will never be dead for us as long as we remember them.

Other versions are available, including one with a sound recording.

== See also ==
- Australian Aboriginal languages

== Bibliography ==
- T. Crowley & R.M.W. Dixon (1981) 'Tasmanian'. In Dixon & Blake (eds.), Handbook of Australian Languages, pp. 395–427. The Australian National University Press.
- Plomley, N. J. B. (1976), A word-list of the Tasmanian languages, N. J. B. Plomley and the Government of Tasmania
- "Pakana Luwana Liyini" 2005 (CD), Tasmanian Aboriginal Centre Inc
- Sainty, T., "Tasmanian places and Tasmanian Aboriginal language" 2005, Placenames Australia Newsletter of the Australian National Placenames Survey
