= Ngumbarl language =

Extinct Nyulnyulan language of Australia

Ngumbarl
- Region: Australia
- Ethnicity: Ngombal
- Extinct: after late 1960s
- Language family: Nyulnyulan: Eastern; Ngumbarl

Language codes
- ISO 639-3: xnm
- Glottolog: ngum1253
- AIATSIS: K4
- ELP: Ngumbarl
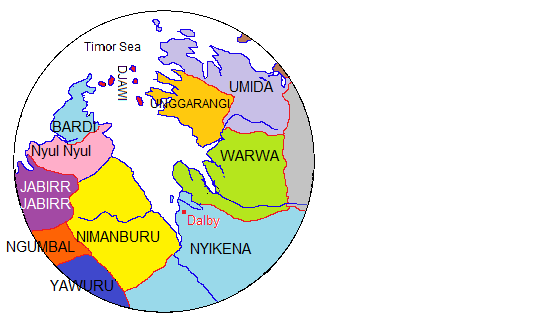
- Traditional lands of Aboriginal tribes around Derby. Ngumbarl is in orange, in the bottom left

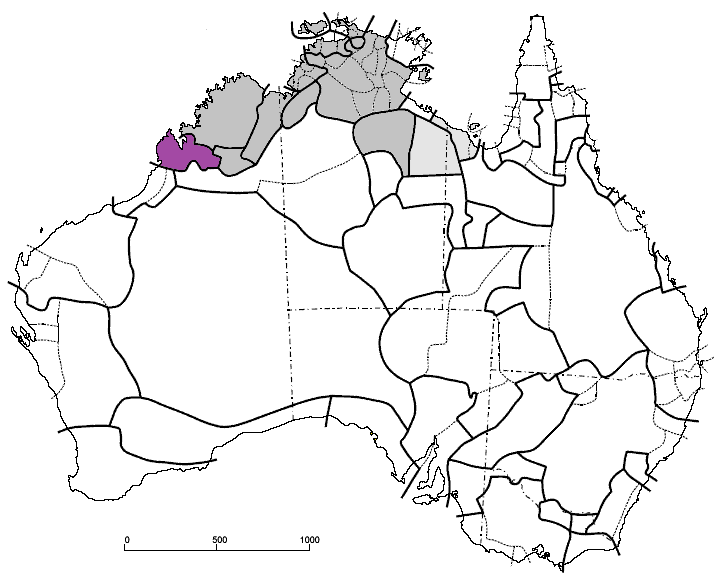
- Nyulnyulan languages (purple), of which Ngumbarl is one, among other non-Pama-Nyungan languages (grey)

Ngumbarl (Ngombaru, Ngormbal) is an extinct, poorly-attested Nyulnyulan language formerly spoken in Western Australia, north of the town of Broome along the coast, by the Ngumbarl people.

== Documentation ==
The language was previously thought to be unattested. Although Daisy Bates had recorded data, comprising a wordlist and a few sentences, in the early twentieth century with Ngumbarl/Jukun informant Billingee, it had previously been thought the data were only for Jukun. The list contains about 800 words, but the orthography is inconsistent and the translations are somewhat unreliable (e.g. ⟨jooa inja pindana⟩ juwa inja bindana is translated "are you hunting kangaroo?" but actually means "you're going to the pindan").

== Phonology ==
It is difficult to infer much about Ngumbarl's phonology, because of the orthography used in its corpus. Claire Bowern reconstructs a tentative sound change of word-final -i in the proto-language to -a (e.g. *yaŋki 'what' to ⟨yanga⟩ yaŋka).

== Grammar ==
The ergative suffix was -na; if this evolved from *-ni, it matches the previously mentioned sound change from -i to -a. The locative was -kun (compare Proto-Nyulnyuylan's *-kun).

Very few verbs, and no full paradigms, are found in the data, although there are some partial paradigms, e.g.:

Ngumbarl	English
⟨kangalainbee⟩ ngangalanybi	I steal
⟨ingalaimbee⟩ ingalanybi	he steals
⟨yeeralanbee⟩ yirrlanybi	they steal

Eastern Nyulnyuylan languages have experienced a group of changes in its verbal morphology:

- Proto-Nyulnyuylan singular past intransitive > Eastern Nyulnyuylan non-past intransitive
- PN singular present transitive > EN non-past transitive
- PN plural present (both transitive and intransitive) > EN non-past plural

Ngumbarl's attested forms are consistent with these — assuming the verb forms were given in the same tense.
