= Billingee =

Aboriginal man from Jajjala

Billingee (also Billinggi or Billing-gi) was an Aboriginal man from Jajjala, near Broome, Western Australia. He was a significant cultural intermediary active during the early twentieth century.

During the early twentieth century Billingee worked with Daisy Bates to record materials in the Ngumbarl language. In collaboration with Bates, he also created a book of drawings illustrating cultural practices of the people of the Broome region. This book (which was given to the Governor of Western Australia in 1907) may be the earliest account of an Aboriginal man from the Kimberley region to depict his cultural heritage through the use of 'European' art media. Cynthia Coyne argues that Billingee would have intended these drawings to be "an assertion of his culture".

Billingee's drawing book was later acquired by the State Library of Western Australia.
