= Ngumbarl people =

Aboriginal Australian people

The Ngumbarl are an Aboriginal Australian people of Western Australia.

== Language ==
Adequate documentation of the Ngumbarl language is lacking, but the evidence suggests it was one of the Nyulnyulan languages, with linguist William B. McGregor speculating that it may have belonged to the western branch.

== Country ==
In Norman Tindale's estimation, the Ngombal's tribal lands covered some 1,200 square miles (3,100 km^{2}). They were a coastal people with an inland territorial reach of about 30 miles, located between the Djaberadjabera to their north, the Nimanburu to the east, the Yawuru to the southeast and the Djugun to their south.

== Alternative names ==
- Ngormbal
- Ngombal
- Ngombaru
- Ngumbarl

== Sources ==
- "AIATSIS map of Indigenous Australia". AIATSIS. 14 May 2024.
- Bischofs, P. Jos (1908). "Die Niol-Niol ein Eingeborenenstamm in Nordwest Australien". Anthropos. 3 (1): 32–40. JSTOR 40442523.
- McGregor, William B. (2013). The Languages of the Kimberley, Western Australia. Routledge. ISBN 978-1-134-39602-3.
- "Tindale Tribal Boundaries" (PDF). Department of Aboriginal Affairs, Western Australia. September 2016. Archived from the original (PDF) on 8 March 2016.
- Tindale, Norman Barnett (1974). "Ngombal (WA)". Aboriginal Tribes of Australia: Their Terrain, Environmental Controls, Distribution, Limits, and Proper Names. Australian National University Press. ISBN 978-0-708-10741-6. Archived from the original on 20 March 2020.
