= Tommeginne language =

Extinct Aboriginal language of Tasmania

Tommeginne
- Northern Tasmanian
- Region: North-central coast of Tasmania
- Ethnicity: Northern tribe of Tasmanians
- Extinct: 19th century
- Language family: Northern–Western Tasmanian?: Northern Tasmanian; Tommeginne

Language codes
- ISO 639-3: xpv
- Glottolog: None
- AIATSIS: T1

Northern Tasmanian, or Tommeginne (Tommeeginnee, Tommyginny), is an Aboriginal language of Tasmania in the reconstruction of Claire Bowern.

Northern Tasmanian is attested from word lists collected on Flinders Island by Joseph Milligan, which were published in 1857 and 1859. One, labeled "northwest tribes", contains 268 words; the other, labeled "western tribes", contains 369.
