= Western Tasmanian languages =

Language family of Tasmania

Western Tasmanian
- Geographic distribution: Western coast and northwestern corner of Tasmania
- Ethnicity: Northwestern and Southwestern tribes of Tasmanians
- Linguistic classification: Northern–Western Tasmanian?: Western Tasmanian
- Subdivisions: Northwestern (Peerapper) †; ? West Point †; ? Southwestern (Toogee) †

Language codes
- Glottolog: west2205
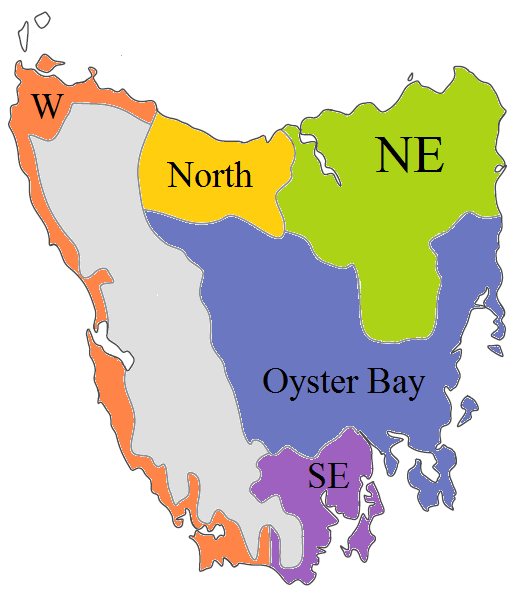
- Tasmanian language families per Bowern (2012). Western Tasmanian

Western Tasmanian is an aboriginal language family of Tasmania in the reconstruction of Claire Bowern.

== Languages ==
The Western Tasmanian languages are the most poorly attested of all Tasmanian families. Bayesian phylogenetic analysis suggests (at either p < 0.15 or p < 0.20) that Northwestern Tasmanian and Southwestern Tasmanian were distinct languages; several word lists of unrecorded provenance turn out to be Western Tasmanian or to have Western words mixed in. Bayesian analysis does not support a connection to other Tasmanian languages. However, manual comparison suggests they are related to the Northern Tasmanian languages, which are less poorly attested, though the similarities may be due to loans.

Between the region inhabited by Western language groups and other Tasmanian language groups, there is a large strip of land in the western interior where no information has been found or published regarding possible inhabitants. This area has been mapped as having isolated the Western language groups from the rest of Tasmania except by small shared borders along the north and south coasts, or on one shared border along the south coast only.
