= Tyerrernotepanner language =

Extinct aboriginal language of Tasmania

Tyerrernotepanner
- North Midland Tasmanian, "Cheranotipana"
- Region: North-eastern Tasmania
- Ethnicity: North Midland tribe of Tasmanians
- Extinct: 19th century
- Language family: Northeastern Tasmanian: Tyerrernotepanner

Language codes
- ISO 639-3: xph
- Glottolog: neta1235
- AIATSIS: T4

North Midland Tasmanian, or Tyerrernotepanner ("Cheranotipana"), was an Aboriginal language of northeastern Tasmania, along the Tamar River and inland of Ben Lomond and Great Oyster Bay.

Tyerrernotepanner is attested in the 125 words of the Port Dalrymple vocabulary collected by J.-P. Gaimard in the Tamar River region. It is most closely related to Northeastern Tasmanian, and Bowern considers it a variety of that language. However, it was divergent, and Dixon & Crowley (1981) believe that it must have been a distinct language.
