= George Augustus Robinson =

Colonial government appointed conciliator, remover and Protector of Aborigines

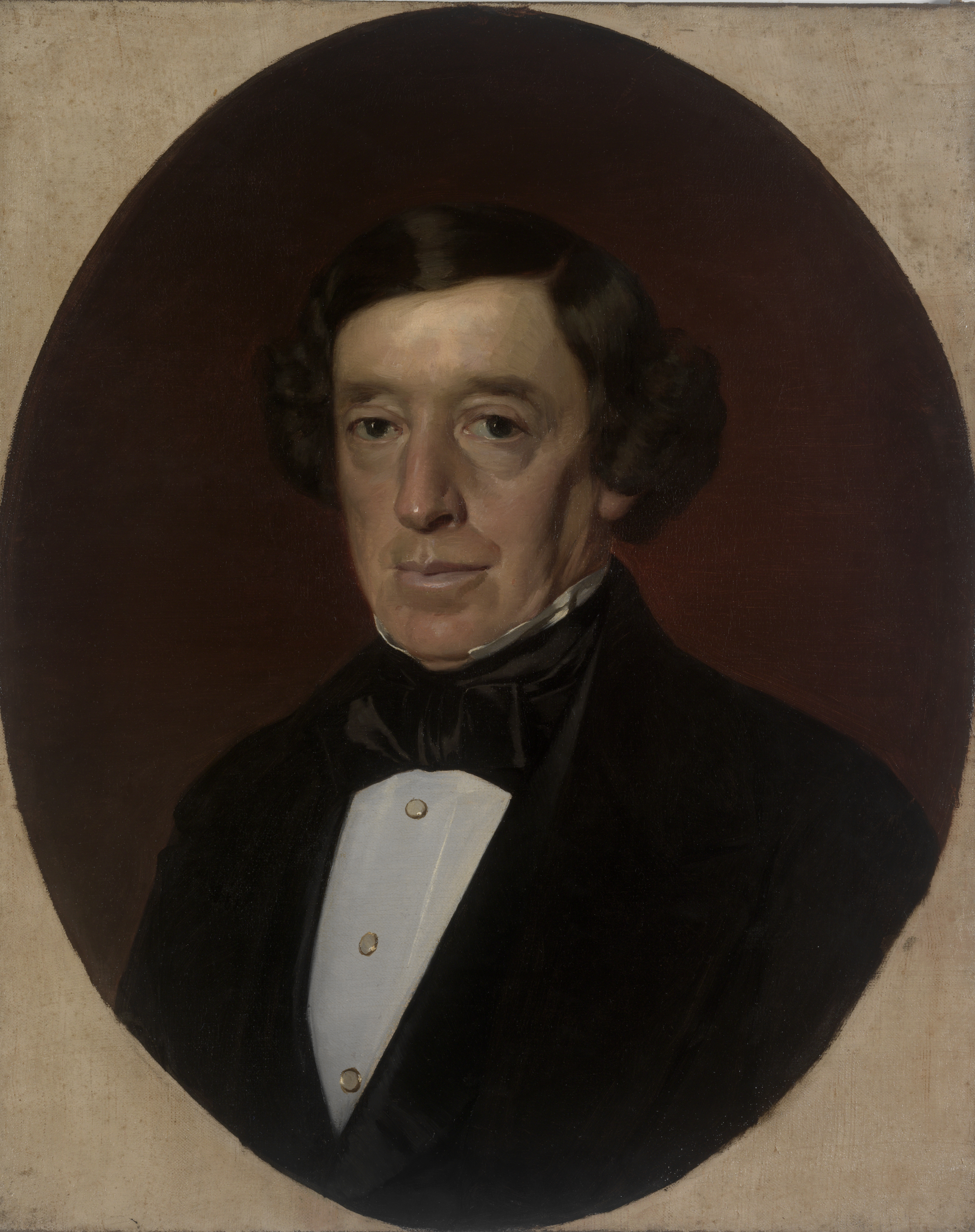
- Robinson in 1853
- Born: 22 March 1791; London, England
- Died: 18 October 1866 (aged 75); Bath, Somerset, England
- Occupations: Builder, Protector of Aborigines
- Known for: removing Aboriginal Tasmanians into exile; documenting Aboriginal society and frontier conflict; leading role in enacting both protective and genocidal policies
- Spouses: Maria Evans (m. 1814; died 1848) Rose Pyne (m. 1853)

George Augustus Robinson (22 March 1791 – 18 October 1866) was an English-born builder and self-trained preacher who was employed by the British colonial authorities to conciliate the Indigenous Australians of Van Diemen's Land and the Port Phillip District to the process of British colonization.

In 1830, Robinson, with the guidance of Aboriginal Tasmanians such as Truganini and Woureddy, led what became known as "the friendly mission" around Van Diemen’s Land, which was organised to establish contact with the surviving Indigenous clans during the Black War. The mission later evolved into a series of further ethnic cleansing expeditions to round up these survivors and place them into enforced exile at the Wybalenna Aboriginal Establishment on Flinders Island. From 1835 to 1839, Robinson became the superintendent of this facility, where his mismanagement resulted in the deaths of many of those exiled.

He was appointed Chief Protector of Aborigines by the Aboriginal Protection Board in Port Phillip District, New South Wales in 1839, a position he held until 1849. His documentation of his many travels around what is now the state of Victoria are still a uniquely significant source of historical and cultural information about the Indigenous people of this region and their destruction by British colonists.

Robinson is noted as a complex and controversial individual who played an important role in both preserving a record of Aboriginal society and profiteering from enacting genocidal policies against these same people. He is also remembered today for his role in the supply of Aboriginal skeletal remains to English 'collectors'.

== Early life ==
Robinson was born on 22 March 1791 in London, England, to William Robinson, a construction worker, and Susannah Robinson (née Perry). He followed his father into the building trade, married Maria Amelia Evans on 28 February 1814, and had five children over the next ten years. He worked as a bricklayer at the Chatham Dockyard and had some involvement with the construction of martello towers along England's coast. Robinson then became a builder in London manufacturing bricks and tiles.

In 1823, Robinson was involved in a financial scandal with a religious institution which resulted in him fleeing England. He made for Scotland, leaving his wife and family under the care of his brother. He sought to leave Britain altogether, initially purchasing a ticket to the Mosquito Coast as part of Gregor MacGregor's fraudulent Poyais scheme. But after hearing that it was a swindle, he instead purchased a steerage berth on a ship to Australia. Robinson failed to convince his wife to come with him and sailed in September 1823 alone.

== Van Diemen's Land ==
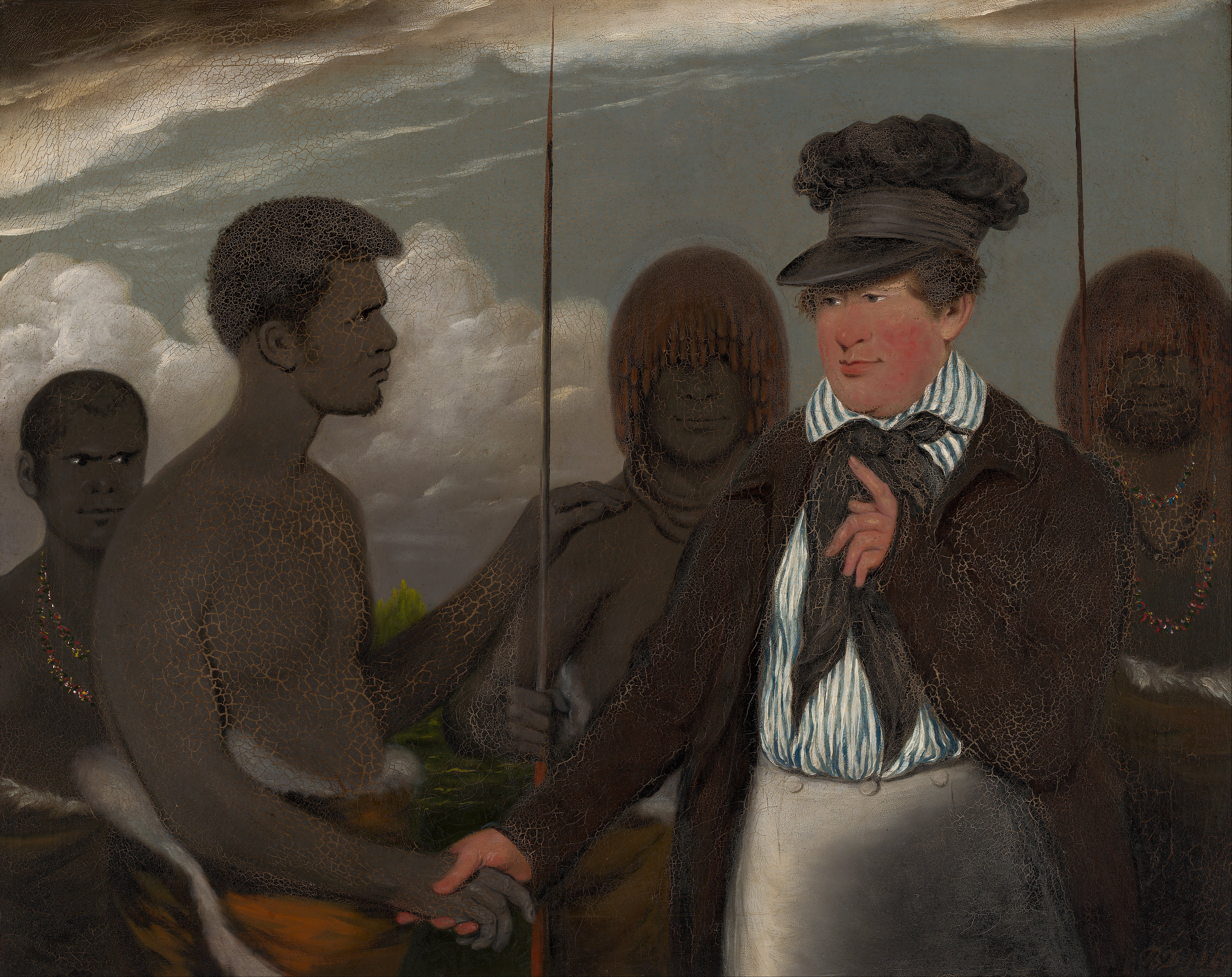
Robinson with Tasmanian Aborigines

Robinson arrived in Hobart in January 1824. He established himself as a builder and was soon employing several men. He was secretary of the Bethel Union and was a committee member of the Auxiliary Bible Society, also helping to found the Van Diemen's Land Mechanics' Institution. He was allocated a block of land in the township upon which he built a house and was joined by his wife and children in April 1826.

=== The "friendly mission" ===
Bloody conflict between the colonists and the Aboriginal Tasmanians had vastly increased during the 1820s, which evolved into what is known as the Black War. In 1829, Governor George Arthur ordered the establishment of ration station on Bruny Island as a token gesture of goodwill toward the local Nuenonne people who had remained at peace with the British. Robinson had expressed a strong interest in preaching Christianity to the Aborigines and Arthur appointed him as manager of this station where he quickly became familiar with the Nuenonne people, language and customs. However, by the end of the year, almost all of these Aboriginal people had died from introduced disease and violence.

Despite this catastrophe, Robinson conveyed to Governor Arthur the idea his travelling to the uncolonised regions of western Van Diemen's Land where he would conciliate the local Aboriginal clans to be at peace with the British invaders. Arthur accepted this idea and in 1830 Robinson led what became known as the "friendly mission". Robinson had befriended Truganini and Woureddy, two of the few surviving Nuenonne people, and with several other Aboriginal people, they acted as guides for Robinson on the trek through the rugged west coast.

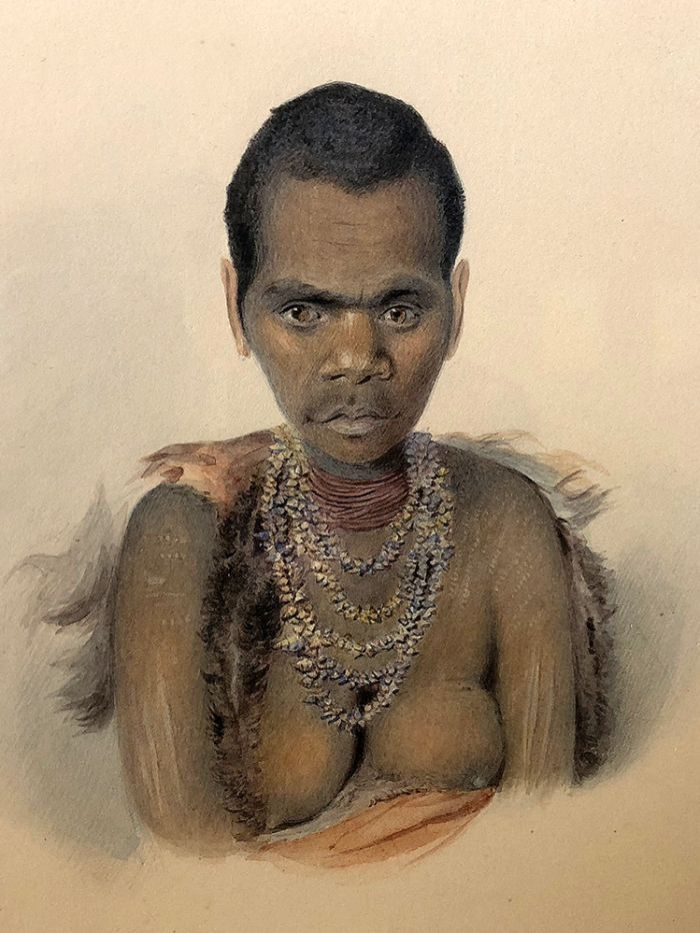
1835 painting by Thomas Bock of Robinson's guide Truganini

Truganini, Woureddy and the others aided Robinson to make contact with the Ninene people around Bathurst Harbour of whom Towterer was a leading figure. They then made their way up the west coast past Macquarie Harbour to Cape Grim, where Robinson was informed of the Cape Grim massacre of Aboriginal people perpetrated by employees of the Van Diemen's Land Company.

Robinson was also informed of Governor Arthur's decree that a £5 bounty was to be awarded for every native captured. His mission subsequently took on a new priority where personal financial gain became a priority. Robinson used a Pairelehoinner youth named Tunnerminnerwait to gather some of the local people, who he shipped to Launceston to claim the bounty.

At Launceston, the settlers were preparing for the climax of the Black War. Called the Black Line, it was a 2,200 man strong chain of armed colonists and soldiers to sweep the settled areas looking to kill or trap any Aboriginal people they found. Robinson was allowed to continue his mission to the north-east, away from the direction of the Black Line.

Robinson's group arrived at Cape Portland in October 1830 having rescued several Indigenous women from the slavery of the local sealers, and been joined by the respected warrior Mannalargenna and his small remnant clan. They were informed of the failure of the Black Line to capture or kill many Aboriginal people and it was decided by the government to use the nearby Bass Strait Islands as a place of enforced exile for those Indigenous Tasmanians collected by Robinson.

Robinson's first choice of island to confine the approximately 20 Aboriginal Tasmanians in his charge was Swan Island. Exposed to powerful gales, the small island had poor access to water supply and was infested with tiger snakes. Robinson soon left for Hobart where he had a meeting with Governor Arthur in early 1831. For his "friendly mission" work, Robinson was rewarded with land grants and hundreds of pounds worth of pay increases.

=== Further expeditions to capture the remaining Aboriginal Tasmanians ===
While in Hobart, Robinson successfully negotiated a contract with the colonial authorities for him to lead further expeditions to capture all the remaining Aboriginal Tasmanians and transfer them to confinement in Bass Strait. Robinson firstly took Truganini, the other guides and around 25 Aboriginal people held in various hospitals and jails in Hobart and Launceston, and transported them to Swan Island where the others were still being held. The combined captive population swelled to over 50 and Robinson decided to move the place of exile to a former sealer's camp on Gun Carriage Island.

==== Expedition of 1831 ====
Gun Carriage Island proved little better than Swan Island and many of the exiled Aborigines started to sicken, with several dying in the first few weeks. Robinson took Truganini, Woureddy, Kikatapula, Pagerly, Mannalargenna, Woretemoeteryenner, Tunnerminnerwait and Maulboyheenner as guides to capture the remaining Aboriginal Tasmanians in the settled districts. They started off in July 1831 with the initial aim of finding the respected Tyerrernotepanner leader Eumarrah and his small clan, whom they captured in late August near the locality of Pipers Brook. They then continued on, looking to take captive the remaining members of the Oyster Bay and Big River tribes who had condensed into a single group taking refuge in the Central Highlands. Truganini and the other Indigenous guides frustrated Robinson by seeming to alert this group of their approach and it wasn't until December that they were seized. This group which included the once-feared warriors Tongerlongeter and Montpelliatta, were paraded in Hobart before being transported to Gun Carriage Island.

==== Expeditions of 1832 and 1833 ====
Robinson then conducted expeditions to capture the remaining Indigenous people of the west coast of Tasmania. Several guides including Eumarrah and Kikatapula died early in the expedition, but Robinson still managed to apprehend through deceitful means most of the remaining tribespeople from the Cape Grim region. In September 1832, Truganini saved Robinson by swimming him across the Arthur River away from a group of Tarkiner people who intended to kill him.

In April 1833, Robinson returned to lead another expedition to seize the west coast clans, with Truganini, Woureddy and others again chosen as guides. Robinson captured the remaining Ninine by taking captive the child of Towterer which forced the clan to surrender. By July they had captured almost all of the remaining west coast people including the Tarkiner tribe led by a man named Wyne who had attempted to kill Robinson the previous year.

Robinson deposited his prisoners at the Macquarie Harbour Penal Station to await transportation to Flinders Island where the Wybalenna Aboriginal Establishment had been formed to replace the internment camp at Gun Carriage Island. The approximately 35 captives were held in terrible conditions at Macquarie Harbour, with around half dying from bacterial pneumonia and suicide within a couple of weeks. This included previously healthy young men, pregnant women and infants. Over 80% of the captured Tarkiner people perished. After shipping off the survivors to Wybalenna, Robinson returned with his guides to Hobart.

==== Expedition of 1834 ====
Some Aboriginal people were still reported to be residing in the wilderness around Sandy Cape and the Vale of Belvoir, so in early 1834 Robinson set out again with Truganini and the other guides to find them. Before heading west, they firstly attempted to obtain two Aboriginal slaves that were in possession of John Batman at his Kingston estate along the Ben Lomond Rivulet. However, Batman, who at this stage had tertiary syphilis, refused to give them up saying they were his property.

From February to April, Robinson's group located and captured twenty Tarkiner people on the west coast. This was despite Truganini and Woureddy temporarily refusing to act as guides for Robinson. However, crossing the Arthur River on the return journey, Truganini again saved Robinson's life by swimming out to his raft and towing it to the bank after it was carried away by the swift current.

After sending these Tarkiner off to exile at Wybalenna, Robinson left the expedition, placing his sons in charge to find the remnant Tommigener clan located near the Vale of Belvoir. For months, Truganini and the others trudged through heavy winter snow and spring rains but finally located the last eight people of this tribe in December near the Western Bluff. In February 1835, these Tommigener were shipped off to Wybalenna from Launceston, leaving Robinson to claim his rewards for removing almost in entirety the remaining Aboriginal population from mainland Tasmania.

== Wybalenna Aboriginal Establishment ==
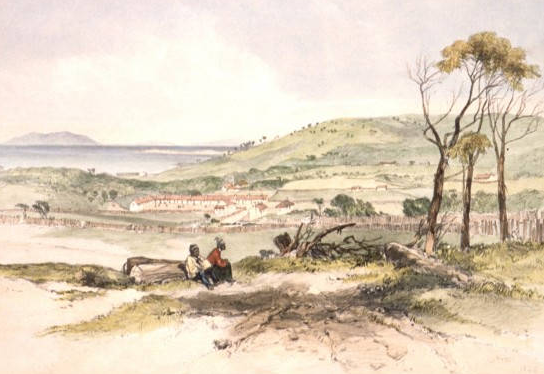
Wybalenna Aboriginal Establishment

In September 1835, with the completion of the removal of Aborigines from mainland Tasmania, Robinson was appointed as their superintendent at the internment facility known as the Wybalenna Aboriginal Establishment on Flinders Island.

Robinson began a program of Christianising the inmates. He changed their names, made them wear European clothes and attempted to prohibit their practising of Aboriginal culture and language, which was completely opposite to what he had promised the Indigenous people when he deceived them into leaving their homelands. The encampment was also badly mismanaged under Robinson and rates of illness and mortality were extremely high.

== Chief Protector of Aborigines in Port Phillip District ==
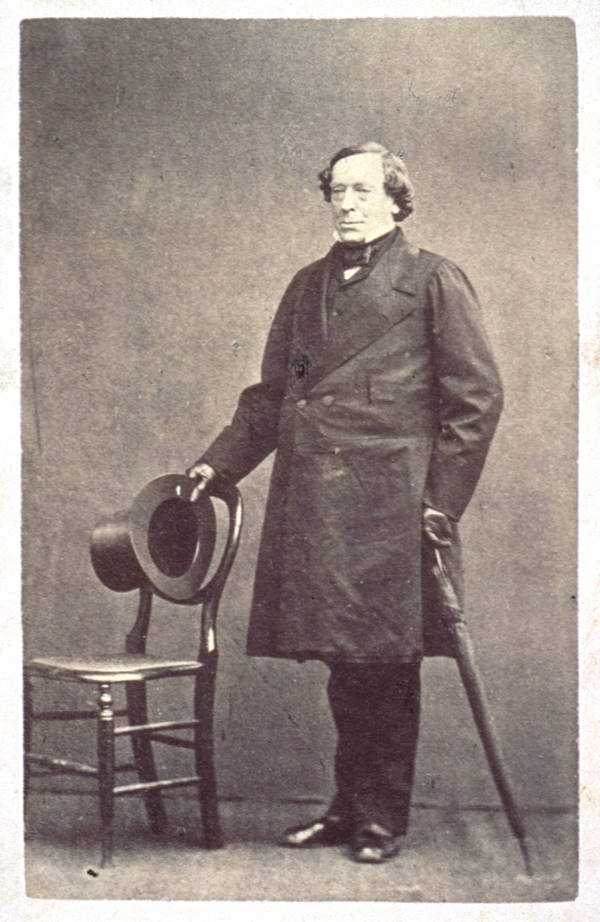
George Augustus Robinson

Robinson was keen to remove himself of responsibility at Wybalenna and in 1839 accepted the position of Protector of Aborigines in the newly colonised Port Phillip District in present-day Victoria. Robinson took his family and seventeen Aboriginal Tasmanians from Wybalenna with him as servants. Robinson was assigned with four Assistant Protectors, William Thomas, James Dredge, Edward Stone Parker and Charles Sievwright.

Robinson established himself and his family in Melbourne, buying a prime parcel of land in South Yarra. He took a census of Aboriginal people living at the fringes of the settlement and noted the high rates introduced disease and morbidity amongst them. However, he was mostly unable or unwilling to alleviate their plight. He did, though, take an active role in advocating for better legal rights for the Aborigines especially after the Lettsom raid, where the colonial government used the military and police to force the expulsion of Indigenous people from Melbourne.

During his decade of service as Chief Protector he made more than 20 expeditions into the four districts of the Aboriginal Protectorate located in what is now Victoria.

In 1841 and 1842, Robinson traveled to western Victoria with Tunnerminnerwait where he investigated and reported on the Convincing Ground massacre that had occurred in 1833 or 1834. In 1841 he investigated a gunshot incident, and whilst travelling came across the aboriginal aquaculture site of Lake Condah, recording its dimensions.

His journals are regarded as amongst the most important documents on the early years of European settlement in Victoria. They offer significant observations on Koorie culture, early Melbourne personalities, the landscape and settler society.

== Later life ==
The Port Phillip Protectorate was abolished on 31 December 1849, with Robinson receiving a pension. He returned to England in 1852 and the following year married Rose Pyne, with whom he had another five children. The couple spent five years living in Europe, mostly in Paris and Rome. In 1859 they settled in Bath, England, where Robinson died on 18 October 1866 at the age of 75.

== Family ==
One of his children was Charles Robinson. He and his son Charles both collected many vocabulary lists from various Aboriginal individuals throughout Tasmania.

== Robinson in contemporary culture ==
Semi-fictional accounts of Robinson's travels are included in Matthew Kneale's book English Passengers and in T. C. Boyle's short story "The Extinction Tales", and Robinson is a major character in Richard Flanagan's 2008 novel Wanting. There is a reference to Robinson in the book The Lost Diamonds of Killiecrankie by Gary Crew and Peter Gouldthorpe, and in Following the Equator, by Mark Twain. Robert Drewes' 'Savage Crows' also incorporates the work of Robinson into the plot. See also Mudrooroo's critical portrayal of Robinson in Doctor Wooreddy's Prescription for Enduring the Ending of the World, Master of the Ghost Dreaming and his Vampire Trilogy: The Undying, Underground and The Promised Land. Additionally, Cassandra Pybus' 2020 biography of Truganini, entitled Truganini: Journey Through the Apocalypse provides a detailed account of Robinson's personal relationship with Truganini and the traumatic psychological and cultural shifts experienced by Aboriginal Tasmanians.

Tasmanian artist Julie Gough referenced Robinson and his work in her 2019 exhibition Tense Past at Tasmania Museum & Art Gallery.

== Robinson and museum collections ==
During Robinson's time in Tasmania and Victoria, he collected a large number of objects and artworks from the Aboriginal communities there. He also collected human skulls and other Aboriginal remains. After his death, his widow Rose sold the items to many museums. The British Museum has 138 items relating to Robinson's time in Australia, including Aboriginal artefacts, prints and drawings. Joseph Barnard Davis acquired many from Robinson's widow in the 1860s, and it may be through his activities that objects subsequently found their way into other collections, for example at the British Museum. Leeds Discovery Centre has two spears he collected. The Pitt Rivers Museum in Oxford holds nineteen objects relating to Robinson's time abroad. The collection at Pitt Rivers includes several paintings and prints describing individual people from Aboriginal communities, including: Truggernana, Jenny, and Fanny, amongst others.

== Archival materials ==
The George Augustus Robinson papers collection held at the Mitchell Library, Sydney consists of 72 volumes organized into 7 series. Brian Plomley arranged the collection from 1961–1962. The collection was microfilmed from 1971–1998. The collection contains journals, letters, vocabularies, drawings, photographs, and other types of materials. In 1939, the Magg Brothers in London purchased the collection for the Mitchell Library from the estate of Albert Robinson, the son of George Augustus Robinson. They were held in the National Library of Wales at Aberystwyth from 1939-1947 and were transferred to the Mitchell Library in Sydney in 1947.

Below are some vocabularies of Tasmanian Aborigines (i.e., word lists of Tasmanian languages) from the George Augustus Robinson papers collection held at the State Library of New South Wales:

- George Augustus Robinson papers, 1818-1924
  - Series 5: George Augustus Robinson, Aboriginal vocabularies, 1830-1866
    - File 1: George Augustus Robinson, Aboriginal vocabularies, Tasmania, 1830-1840, 1866 (call number: A 7085)
      - Item 1: George Augustus Robinson, Aboriginal vocabulary of the natives of Eastern Tasmania, 1830-1831 (contains: Aboriginal vocabulary of the natives of Eastern Tasmania, Oct. 1830; Aboriginal vocabulary of Tasmania, 1831)
      - Item 2: George Augustus Robinson, Aboriginal vocabulary of Northern Tasmania, 1830-1831
      - Item 3: George Augustus Robinson, vocabulary of Tasmanian Aborigines, 1832
      - Item 4: George Augustus Robinson, vocabulary of words spoken by the Aboriginal natives who formerly inhabited the Island of Van Diemen's Land, June 1840
      - Item 5: George Augustus Robinson, vocabulary of Tasmanian Aborigines
      - Item 6: George Augustus Robinson, Aboriginal vocabulary of the natives of various tribes in Tasmania, 1838

Item 6 contains the following vocabularies, all of which are written in the hand of Charles Robinson, the son of George Augustus Robinson:

1. Vocabulary of the Tasmanian Aboriginal Natives
2. Big River language [Tasmanian Aboriginal vocabulary]
3. Tasmanian Aboriginal vocabulary
4. Aboriginal vocabulary for parts of the body in Ben Lomond, Big River, and Port Sorell native languages, Jan. 1838
5. Port Sorell Aboriginal vocabulary
6. Ben Lomond Aboriginal vocabulary
7. West Coast Aboriginal vocabulary
8. Tarmurie (?) [or Larmuric?] Aboriginal vocabulary
