= Northeastern Tasmanian languages =

Language in Tasmania, Australia

Northeastern Tasmanian
- Geographic distribution: NE Tasmania
- Ethnicity: Northeastern, Ben Lomond, and North Midland tribes of Tasmanians
- Extinct: 19th century
- Linguistic classification: Possibly one of the world's primary language families (see Tasmanian languages)
- Subdivisions: Pyemmairre (Northeastern language) †; Tyerrernotepanner (North Midland language) †; "Lhotsky/Backhouse" †; "Norman" †

Language codes
- Glottolog: nort1442
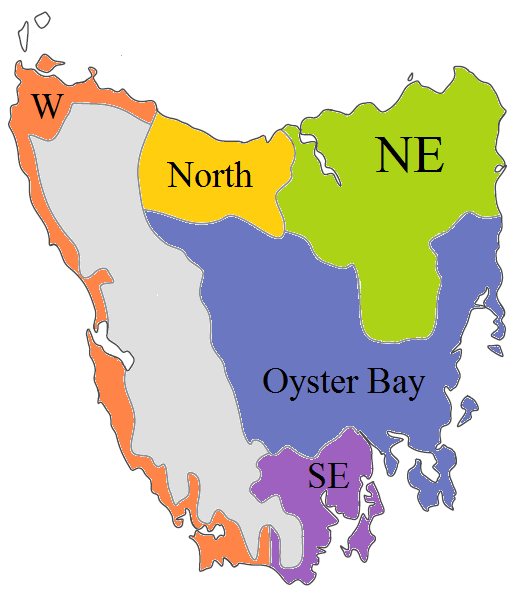
- Tasmanian language families per Bowern (2012). Northeastern Tasmanian

Northeastern Tasmanian is an aboriginal language family of Tasmania in the reconstruction of Claire Bowern.

== Languages ==
It is suggested, based on Bayesian phylogenetic analysis (at either p < 0.15 or p < 0.20), that three Northeastern Tasmanian languages are recorded in the 26 unmixed Tasmanian word lists (out of 35 lists known). According to Bowern's analysis, the Lhotsky and Backhouse/Walker lists, which do not record their provenance, together with the "Eastern" Jorgenson list, attest to a previously unidentified language in the northeastern family, as does the "Norman" list of Charles Sterling. The other lists attest to a single language, though the dialect of the Tamar River region (North Midlands tribe) is divergent, and Dixon & Crowley consider it to be a distinct language. There are thus tentatively up to four attested Northeastern Tasmanian languages:

- Northeastern Tasmanian
  - Pyemmairre (Northeastern language)
    - Tyerrernotepanner (North Midland language)
  - Lhotsky/Backhouse
  - "Norman"

These languages cannot be shown to be related to other Tasmanian languages based on existing evidence.

Two of the word lists reported to be from Oyster Bay (see Eastern Tasmanian languages) contain substantial Northeastern admixture, as the authors traveled along the coast collecting "Tasmanian" words, which Bowern believes to be responsible for several classifications linking the languages of the east coast. However, once that admixture is accounted for, the apparent links disappear.
