= Paredarerme language =

Extinct Eastern Tasmanian language

Paredarerme
- Oyster Bay
- Region: central and central-eastern Tasmania
- Ethnicity: Oyster Bay and Big River tribes of Tasmanians
- Extinct: 19th century
- Language family: Eastern Tasmanian: Oyster Bay languages; Paredarerme
- Dialects: ?Oyster Bay lingua franca (Tasmanian creole mainly with elements of that language) †; Big River dialect (Lairmairrener) †; ?Bass Strait Pidgin (may have been related to the lingua fanca) †

Language codes
- ISO 639-3: xpd
- Glottolog: None oyst1235 (Oyster Bay + Little Swanport)
- AIATSIS: T2 Oyster Bay, T8 Big River

Paredarerme (also known as Paytirami, Poredareme or Oyster Bay Tasmanian) is an Aboriginal language of Tasmania in the reconstruction of Claire Bowern. It was spoken along the central eastern coast of the island by the Oyster Bay tribe, and in the interior by the Big River tribe. Records of the Big River dialect, Lairmairrener ("Lemerina"), indicate that it was no more distinct than the vocabularies collected along the coast around Oyster Bay; indeed, Little Swanport appears to have been a separate language.

Big River Tasmanian is attested in a list of 268 words collected by George Augustus Robinson. Coastal vocabularies include the Oyster Bay list of Robinson (357 words), and a second collected by Joseph Milligan of 1,040 words published in 1857 and 1859. The last is the longest vocabulary of any variety of Tasmanian.
