= Brian Plomley =

Australian historian (1912–1994)

Norman James Brian Plomley AM (born 6 November 1912 – 8 April 1994, Launceston) was an Australian historian. He is known for his research on the Tasmanian Aborigines.

== Education ==
Plomley graduated with a Bachelor of Science degree from Sydney University in 1935. He did postgraduate work at Cambridge University in 1936–1937 and obtained his Master of Science degree from the University of Tasmania in 1947.

== Career ==
Qualified as an anatomist, throughout a varied academic career Plomley worked in England; and Hobart, Sydney, and Melbourne, Australia, mostly as a lecturer in anatomy. he was Senior Lecturer in Anatomy at the University of Sydney from 1950 to 1960, and subsequently at the University of New South Wales (1961–1965), and University College, London, (1966–1973). He later acquired distinction as an ethnological historian, and from 1974 to 1976, was Senior Associate in Aboriginal and Oceanic Ethnology at the University of Melbourne. Plomley's publications, especially his seminal Friendly Mission (1966), reawakened interest in the study of Tasmanian Aboriginal history.

Plomley was conservative by temperament and a traditional state historian. He established the Plomley Foundation at the Queen Victoria Museum and Art Gallery in Launceston, where he had worked as its director from 1946 to 1950. He donated his collection of books, maps and papers to that museum on his death.

== Published works ==
In the academic literature, he is frequently cited as N. J. B. Plomley.

=== Books and booklets ===
- Tasmanian Aboriginal material in collections in Europe, 1961
- French manuscripts referring to the Tasmanian aborigines: a preliminary report, Museum Committee, Launceston City Council, 1966
- (editor) Friendly mission: The Tasmanian Journals and Papers of George Augustus Robinson 1829–1834, Tasmanian Historical Research Association, Hobart, 1966
- Friendly mission: the Tasmanian journals and papers of George Augustus Robinson, 1829-1934. A supplement, Tasmanian Historical Research Association, 1971
- A summary of published work on the physical anthropology of the Tasmanian aborigines, Museum Committee, Launceston City Council, 1966
- An annotated bibliography of the Tasmanian aborigines, Royal Anthropological Institute Occasional paper, no. 28, London, 1969
- Several generations, Wentworth Books, 1971
- A manual of dissection for students of dentistry, Churchill Livingstone, 1975
- A word-list of the Tasmanian languages, 1976
- The Baudin expedition and the Tasmanian Aborigines 1802, Blubber Head Press, Hobart, 1983
- Weep in silence: a history of the Flinders Island aboriginal settlement, with the Flinders Island journal of George Augustus Robinson, 1835–1839, Blubber Head Press, Hobart, 1987
- (editor) Jorgen Jorgenson and the Aborigines of Van Diemen's Land : being a reconstruction of his "lost" book on their customs and habits, and on his role in the Roving Parties and the Black Line, Blubber Head Press, 1991
- The Tasmanian tribes & cicatrices as tribal indicators among the Tasmanian Aborigines, Queen Victoria Museum and Art Gallery, Launceston, 1992
- The Tasmanian aborigines, Plomley Foundation, Launceston, 1993
- The Tasmanian tribes, Queen Victoria Museum and Art Gallery, Launceston, 1993

=== Co-authored books ===
- (with A. L. Meston) Miscellaneous notes on the culture of the Tasmanian Aboriginal, National Museum of Victoria, 1956
- (with William Frank Ellis), A list of Tasmanian Aboriginal material in collections in Europe, Museum Committee, Launceston City Council, 1962
- (with Claudia Sagona), An annotated bibliography of the Tasmanian Aborigines, 1970–1987, Art School Press, Chisholm Institute of Technology, 1989
- (with Christine Cornell and Max Banks), Francois Peron's natural history of Maria Island, Tasmania, Records of the Queen Victoria Museum Launceston; no. 99, 1990
- (with Kristen Anne Henley) The sealers of Bass Strait and the Cape Barren Island community, Blubber Head Press, Hobart, 1990
- (with Lynda Manley, Caroline Goodall) The Westlake papers: records of interviews in Tasmania by Ernest Westlake, 1908–1910, Occasional paper No.4, Queen Victoria Museum & Art Gallery 1991
- (with Caroline Goodall) Tasmanian aboriginal place names, Queen Victoria Museum and Art Gallery, Launceston, 1992
- (with Caroline Goodall, Martina Smythe) The aboriginal/settler clash in Van Diemen's Land 1803–1831, Queen Victoria Museum and Art Gallery, Queen Victoria Museum & Art Gallery, Occasional Paper, No.6 Launceston, 1992
- (with Josiane Piard-Bernier) The General: the visits of the expedition led by Bruny d'Entrecasteaux to Tasmanian waters in 1792 and 1793, Queen Victoria Museum & Art Gallery, Launceston, 1993
- (with Mary Cameron) Plant foods of the Tasmanian aborigines, Queen Victoria Museum & Art Gallery, 1993

=== Short biographies ===
- Meston, Archibald Lawrence (1890-1951), educationist, historian and anthropology', in Bede Nairn and Geoffrey Serle (eds), Australian Dictionary of Biography, vol. 10, Melbourne: Melbourne University Press, 1986, pp. 489–490
- Scott, Herbert Hedley (1866-1938), Museum Curator', in Geoffrey Serle (ed.), Australian Dictionary of Biography, vol. 11, Melbourne: Melbourne University Press, 1988, p. 546

=== Journal articles ===
- "Thomas Bock's Portraits of the Tasmanian Aborigines", Records of the Queen Victoria Museum (Tasmania), vol. 18, 1965, pp. 1–24
- "The Baudin Expedition and the Tasmanian Aborigines in 1802", Margin, vol. 22, 1990, pp. 4–12

=== Scientific papers ===
- (With A.L. McAulay and J.M. Ford), "Saltants produced in the fungus Chaetomium globosum by monochromatic ultra-violet irradiation and a growth effect characteristic of wavelength", in Australian Journal of Experimental Biology and Medical Science, 23 (1945), pp. 53–57
- (with Joan Munro Ford Nicolls, and Alexander Lester McAulay) 'Mutations produced by monochromatic ultra-violet irradiation and X-irradiation of spores of the fungus Chaetomium,' University of Tasmania Dept. of Physics, 1949
