= Languages of Oceania =

The branches of the Oceanic languages Admiralties and Yapese St Matthias Western Oceanic Temotu Southeast Solomons Southern Oceanic Micronesian Samoan-Polynesian

Native languages of Oceania fall into three major geographic groups:

- The large Austronesian language family, with such languages as Malay (Indonesian), Tagalog (Filipino), and Polynesian languages such as Māori and Hawaiian
- The various Aboriginal Australian language families, including the large Pama–Nyungan family
- The various Papuan language families of New Guinea and neighbouring islands, including the large Trans–New Guinea family

Contact between Austronesian and Papuan resulted in several instances in mixed languages such as Maisin.

Non-indigenous languages include:

- English in Australia, Hawaii, New Zealand, and other territories
- French in French Polynesia, New Caledonia, Vanuatu, and Wallis and Futuna
- Hindi in Fiji
- Japanese in Palau
- Spanish in Easter Island, Micronesia and Guam

There are also creoles formed from the interaction of Malay or the colonial languages with indigenous languages, such as Tok Pisin, Bislama, Pijin, various Malay trade and creole languages, Samoan Plantation Pidgin, Hawaiian Pidgin, Norfuk, Pitkern, and Unserdeutsch.

Finally, immigrants brought their own languages, such as Mandarin, Italian, Arabic, Cantonese, Greek and others in Australia, or Fiji Hindi in Fiji.

== See also ==
- List of extinct languages of Oceania
- Culture of Oceania
- Languages of Africa
- Languages of Asia
- Languages of the United States

By ISO 639-3 code
Enter an ISO code to find the corresponding language article.
