= Maritime Polynesian Pidgin =

Pidgin language uses between European sailors and Polynesians

- Native to: Cook Islands
- Region: Pacific
- Era: 18th–19th centuries
- Language family: Tahitian-, Māori- and Hawaiian-based pidgin

Language codes
- ISO 639-3: None (mis)
- Glottolog: mari1446

Maritime Polynesian Pidgin was a Polynesian-based pidgin that was the main contact language for European exploratory and whaling expeditions to the Pacific during the 18th-19th centuries. It would later be supplanted in that role by Pidgin English, which developed after the 1870s.

According to Drechsel (2014), some segments of the Tahitian, Māori and Hawaiian languages were grammatically similar and mutually intelligible. With European exploration, these forms would have merged into a regional contact language that would later be used for trade with Polynesian populations, and also on board ships, between European and Polynesian members of the crews, in preference to English.

== See also ==
- Pidgin Hawaiian
- Pitkern
- Norfuk
