= Pidgin Hawaiian =

Pidgin spoken in Hawaii in the 19th and 20th centuries

- ‘Ōlelo pa‘i ‘ai
- Native to: Hawaii
- Region: Hawaiian Islands
- Extinct: 1980's
- Language family: Hawaiian-based pidgin
- Writing system: Latin

Language codes
- ISO 639-3: None (mis)
- Glottolog: pidg1249

Pidgin Hawaiian (or Hawaii Plantation Pidgin) Pidgin Hawaiian: ‘Ōlelo pa‘i ‘ai was a pidgin spoken in Hawaii, which draws most of its vocabulary from the Hawaiian language and could have been influenced by other pidgins of the Pacific Ocean region, such as Maritime Polynesian Pidgin. Emerging in the mid-nineteenth century, it was spoken mainly by immigrants to Hawaii, and mostly died out in the early twentieth century, but is still spoken in some communities, especially on the Big Island. Like all pidgins, Pidgin Hawaiian was a fairly rudimentary language, used for immediate communicative purposes by people of diverse language backgrounds, but who were mainly from Southeast Asian countries such as the Philippines and Indonesia. As Hawaiian was the main language of the islands in the nineteenth century, most words came from this Polynesian language, though many others contributed to its formation. In the 1890s and afterwards, the increased spread of English favoured the use of an English-based pidgin instead, which, once nativized as the first language of children, developed into a creole which today is misleadingly called Hawaiian Pidgin. This variety has also been influenced by Pidgin Hawaiian; for example in its use of the grammatical marker pau.

== Phonology ==
Consonants
	Bilabial	Labio-Velar	Dental	Alveolar	Velar	Glottal
Plosive	p				k	ʔ
Nasal	m			n		
Fricative						h
Approximant		w				
Lateral			l			

Vowels
	Front	Central	Back
Close	i		u
Mid	e		o
Open		a	
Diphthong	/iu, eu, ou, au, ei, oi, ai, ao, ae/		

== Grammar ==
=== Pronouns ===
		Subject Object Oblique	ia-marked pronouns
1st	Singular	wau	iawau, ia‘u
1st	Dual	maua	ia maua
1st	Plural	makou	ia makou
2nd	Singular	oe	iaoe
2nd	Dual	olua	ia olua
2nd	Plural	oukou	ia oukou
3rd	Singular	iaia	iaia
3rd	Dual	laua	ia oukou
3rd	Plural	lakou	ia lakou

=== Word order ===
63.6% of Pidgin Hawaiian studied was in Subject-Verb-Object (SVO) word order, 27.3% was in Verb-Subject Object (VSO) word order, and 7.3% was in Subject-object-verb (SOV) word order. VSO occurs most often with stative/ neuter statements and non-human subjects.

Pidgin Hawaiian uses a possessor-possessum word order. No instance of this order could be found in surviving texts between two full nouns but it could be found in instances in which a proper nouns could be interpreted as the possessor.

Possessor-Possessum in Pidgin Hawaiian
Pidgin Hawaiian	Akoi ma kela lumi Lam See
Interlinear Gloss	Akoi LOC DET room Lam see
English	Akoi was in Lam See's room

In 90% of cases the modifying adjective follows the nouns such as in moa wahine eleele" literally meaning "chicken woman black" but translating to "black hen", though in 10% of cases the modifying adjective precedes the noun.

=== Modality ===
Form	Mood
makemake	desiderative
hiki	abilitative
pono	necessity/obligation
kuleana	permission
aole pono/kuleana	Imperatice
paha	possibility/uncertainty
no	probability/certainty

The two Epistemic moods, Paha and no can occur directly before the verb, directly after the verb, or at the end of the sentence.

== Sample text ==
Pidgin Hawaiian	Interlinear gloss	English
Mahope oukou ike ehiku poe kela halewai [...] huna kela pokepoke laau me opihi.	later 2PL see seven people DET prison[...] Hide DET chopped herb with limpet	You will see seven prisoners [...] hide the chopped herb (i.e. opium) among limpets.
Kela pake olelo iaia, “Aole hele malaila,” kela keiki paa ka lima ka pake	DET Chinese speak 3SG NEG go there DET child hold DEF arm DEF Chinese	That Chinese said to him [the child], 'Don't go there,' the child grabbed the Chinese's arm.
Mahope akahi pake holo mai kela Makawela hanapaa wau kui wau ma ka umauma wau mahope kela pake holo mai hemo kela puka wau holo mawaho	Later INDF Chinese run DIR DEF Makawela hold 1SG hit 1SG LOC DEF chest 1SG later DEF Chinese run DIR open DEF door 1SG run outside.	Then a Chinese ran to me as Makawela held me down punching my chest, then the Chinese who ran to me opened the door and I ran outside.

== See also ==
- Maritime Polynesian Pidgin
