= Toogee people =

Aboriginal Australian people of western Tasmania

The Toogee were an Aboriginal Tasmanian people who lived in Western Tasmania, Australia, before European settlement. They ranged from Macquarie Harbour in the north to Port Davey in the south.

The Toogee nation consisted of three bands, the Lowreenne and Mimegin around Macquarie Harbour and the Ninene around Port Davey. The Peternidic band to the north near the Pieman River made frequent visits. They made stone tools, including those from Darwin Glass, a natural glass formed from a meteorite impact. The archeological record for this region goes back to 20,000 years ago with relics found in the Kutikina Cave. They also left behind middens of shells along the coast.

A geological feature south of Tasmania is named after them, the Toogee Subbasin. This is in the northernmost part of the South Tasman Rise, adjacent to the Lowreenne Massif.

== See also ==
- Toogee language

== Sources ==
- "Aboriginal people of Macquarie Harbour". Tasmanian Parks. Archived from the original on 9 March 2011.
- Exon, N. F. (5 October 1997). "Geological framework of the South Tasman Rise, south of Tasmania, and its sedimentary basins". Journal of the Geological Society of Australia. 44 (5): 561 to 577. Bibcode:1997AuJES..44..561E. doi:10.1080/08120099708728337.
- "South Tasman Rise". Geoscience Australia.
