= Cape Portland =

Cape on the north-eastern tip of Tasmania, Australia

Luemerrernanner / Cape Portland
- Coordinates: 40°44′58″S 147°56′43″E
- Country: Australia
- State: Tasmania
- LGA: Dorset Council
- Postcode: 7264

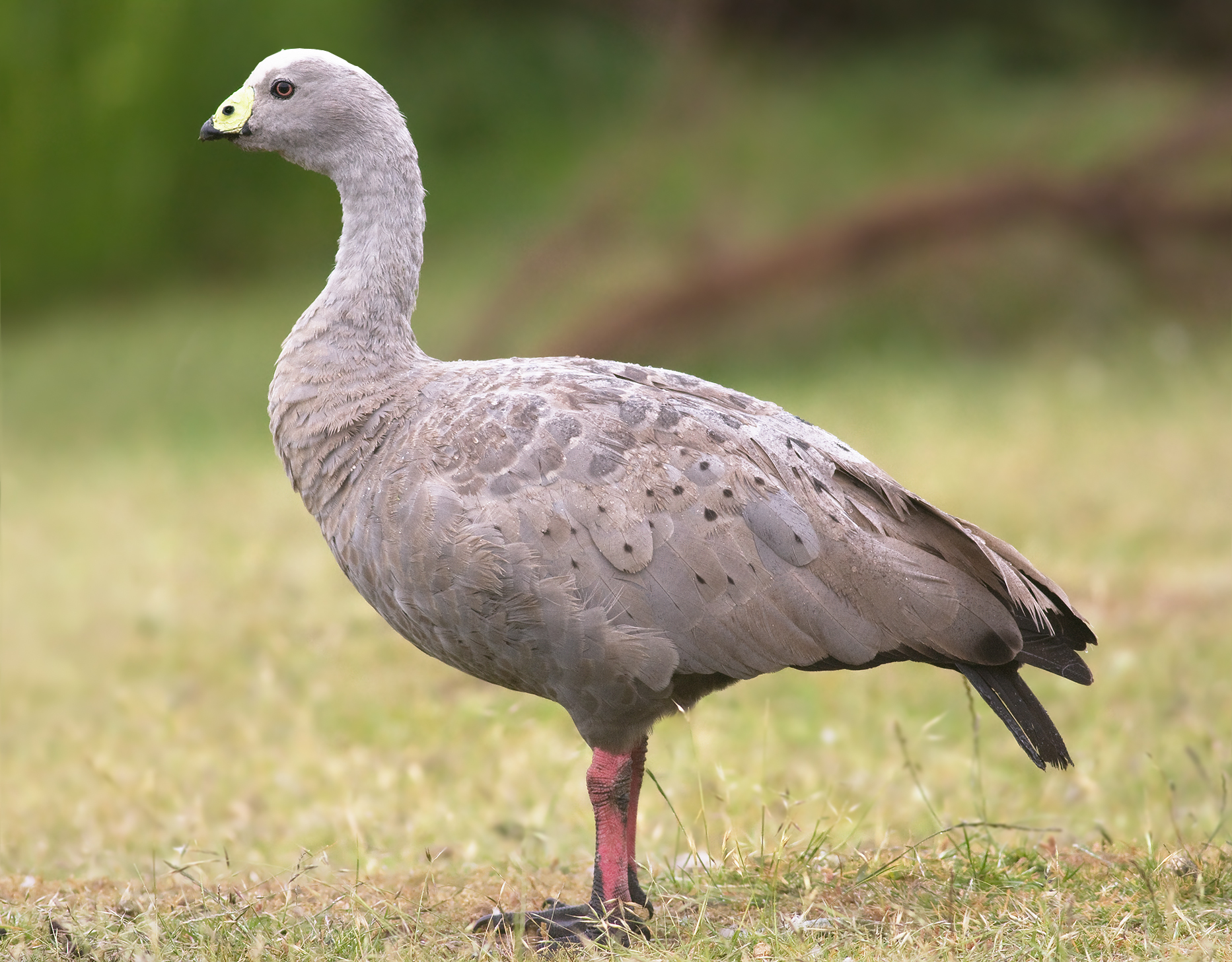
The Cape Portland area is an important site for Cape Barren geese

Cape Portland, officially Luemerrernanner / Cape Portland, is both a geographical feature and a locality near the north-eastern tip of Tasmania, Australia. The cape points west across Ringarooma Bay, where the Ringarooma River empties into the Tasman Sea.

It was named after the Duke of Portland by Matthew Flinders during his 1798 circumnavigation of the island in the sloop Norfolk with George Bass. The Pyemmairre name of the Cape Portland district is Tebrakunna.

Banks Strait separates Cape Portland from Clarke Island, one of the Furneaux Group, to the north.

== History ==
The Pyemmairre language was historically spoken in the Cape Portland area by Aboriginal Tasmanians. Notable Aboriginal Tasmanian individuals from the Cape Portland area included Maulboyheenner, a resistance fighter and guide who was executed by the British in 1842.

Cape Portland Post Office opened on 6 April 1865 (first as a receiving house) and finally closed in 1918.

== Birds ==
It is the site of the 67 km^{2} Cape Portland Important Bird Area which includes the cape itself, some adjacent land, a strip of coastline east of the cape extending to Policemans Point at the mouth of Ansons Bay, and nearby Swan Island. This area supports more than 1% of the world population of the Cape Barren goose, chestnut teal and the near threatened hooded plover. It also occasionally supports large numbers of pied oystercatchers, double-banded plovers and breeding fairy terns.

== Notable people ==
Dora Jeanette Turner (1888–1953), a local educationist, was born here on 8 January 1888.
