= Pyemmairre language =

Extinct language of Tasmania

Pyemmairre
- Northeastern Tasmanian
- Region: North-eastern corner of Tasmania
- Ethnicity: Northeastern and Ben Lomond tribes of Tasmanians
- Extinct: 19th century
- Language family: Northeastern Tasmanian: Pyemmairre

Language codes
- ISO 639-3: xpb
- Glottolog: benl1235
- AIATSIS: T7 Ben Lomond, T9 Cape Portland, T14 Piper River

Northeastern Tasmanian, or Pyemmairre, is an Aboriginal language of Tasmania.

It is identified in the reconstruction of Claire Bowern. It was spoken in the northeastern corner of the island, including at Cape Portland.

Northeastern Tasmanian is attested from three word lists of Charles Robinson and his father George Augustus Robinson: From Cape Portland (366 words), Ben Lomond (195 words), and Pipers River (126 words). Bowern also includes the language of the Port Dalrymple vocabulary (125 words) collected by J.-P. Gaimard in the Tamar River region of the North Midlands; however, it is divergent, and Dixon & Crowley (1981) consider it to be a distinct language.

The name Pyemmairre may not include the highland people of Ben Lomond, for which Plangermaireener ("Plangamerina") has been used.
