= Tasmanian languages =

Indigenous languages of Tasmania

Tasmanian
- (geographic)
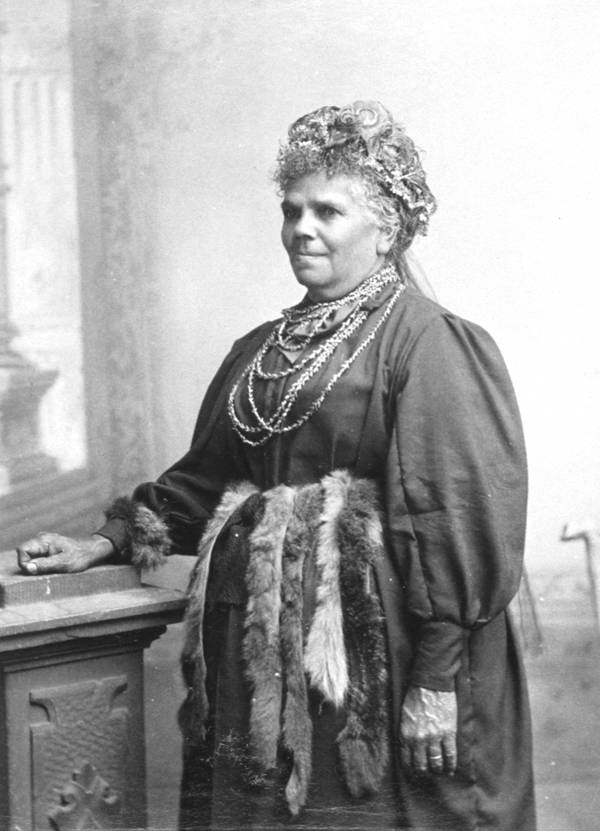
- Fanny Cochrane Smith, last speaker of the Flinders Islands Lingua franca, a Tasmanian Aboriginal language.
- Geographic distribution: Originally, throughout Tasmania; after the Black War, around the Bass Strait; now, presumably, only, in the Flinders Island and other parts of northeastern Tasmania
- Ethnicity: Aboriginal Tasmanians
- Extinct: 1905, with the extinction of the Flinders Islands Lingua franca at the death of Fanny Cochrane Smith
- Linguistic classification: at least three language families: Northeastern; Oyster Bay – Southeastern; Northern–Western?

Language codes
- Glottolog: tasm1247
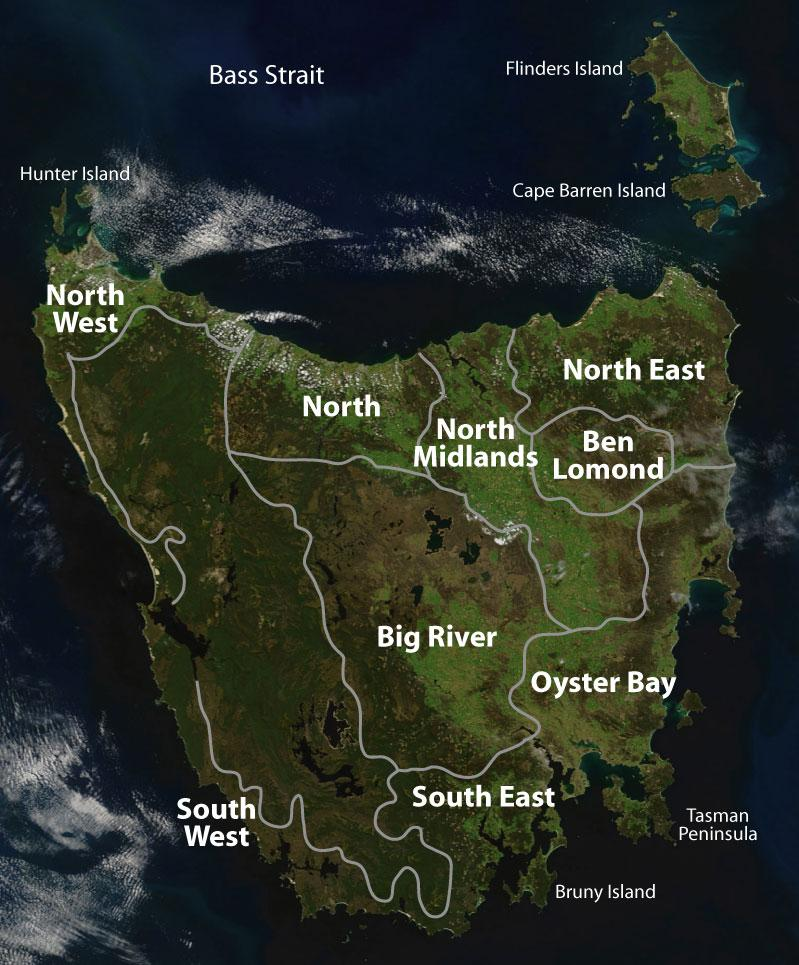
- Approximate ethnic divisions in pre-European Tasmania

The Tasmanian languages were the languages indigenous to the island of Tasmania, used by Aboriginal Tasmanians. The languages were last used for daily communication in the 1830s, although the terminal speaker, Fanny Cochrane Smith, survived until 1905.

== Sources ==
Tasmanian languages are attested by around three dozen word lists, the most extensive being those of Joseph Milligan and George Augustus Robinson. From the limited evidence, the sounds of Tasmanian appear to have been fairly typical of Australian languages. Plomley (1976) presents all the lexical data available to him in 1976. Crowley & Dixon (1981) summarise what little is known of Tasmanian phonology and grammar. Claire Bowern (2012) organises 35 different word lists and attempts to classify them into language families.

Fanny Cochrane Smith recorded a series of wax cylinder recordings of Aboriginal songs, the only existing audio recording of a Tasmanian language, though they are of extremely poor quality. In 1972, her granddaughters still remembered some words and a song. Robert M. W. Dixon, who interviewed them as part of his research with Terry Crowley, concluded that "there is virtually no data on the grammar and no running text so that it is impossible to say very much of linguistic interest about the Tasmanian languages". However, from the scant sources that are available, Tasmanian people are seeking to recover their lost languages and traditions. The largest language revival project to date is the palawa kani project.

== External classification ==
Little is known of the languages and no relationship to other languages is demonstrable. It appears that there were several language families on Tasmania, which would be in keeping with the long period of human habitation on the island. In the 1970s Joseph Greenberg proposed an Indo-Pacific superfamily which includes Tasmanian along with Andamanese and Papuan (but not Australian). However, this superfamily proposal is rejected by the vast majority of historical linguists.

== Languages and language families ==
Based on short wordlists, it appears that there were anywhere from five to sixteen languages on Tasmania, related to one another in perhaps four language families. There are historical records as well that indicate the languages were not mutually intelligible and that a lingua franca was necessary for communication after resettlement on Flinders' Island. J.B. Walker, who visited the island in 1832 and 1834, reported:

Robert Clark, the catechist, states that on his arrival at the Flinders' Settlement in 1834, eight or ten different languages or dialects were spoken amongst the 200 natives then at the establishment, and that the blacks were 'instructing each other to speak their respective tongues'.

— JB Walker (1898:179)

Reports from the subsequent settlement at Oyster Cove were similar:

The Aboriginal dialects made it difficult for the members of one family to understand that of another; "now however they all seem to have merged into one"

— Lennox (1984:60)

Schmidt (1952) distinguished five languages in the word lists:

- Tasmanian languages
  - Eastern Tasmanian languages
    - North-East
    - East
      - East Central (Oyster Bay)
      - South-East
  - Western Tasmanian languages
    - North Coast
    - West Coast

The Eastern languages seem to share a common vocabulary, and use the nominal particle na. The Western languages use leā instead of na.

=== Crowley & Dixon (1981) ===
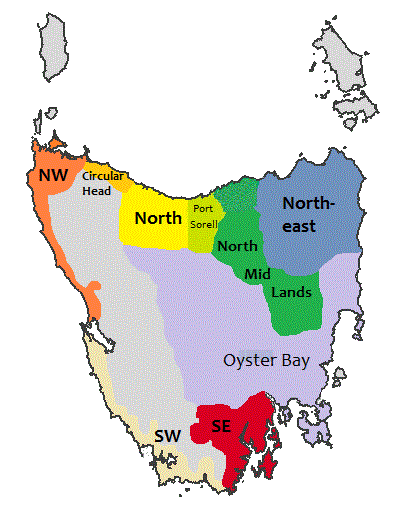
Tasmanian languages according to Dixon & Crowley (1981). Grey was uninhabited at time of contact.

Crowley & Dixon (1981) reviewed the data. They evaluate 13 local varieties, and find 6 to 8 languages, with no conclusion on two additional varieties (those of the west coast) due to lack of data. Listed here (clockwise from the northwest) with their Australian Institute of Aboriginal and Torres Strait Islander Studies (AIATSIS) codes, they are:

- North-western (T3) and Robbins Island (T11*) [northern NW region on the map displayed in the box above at right]
  North-western and Robbins Island are probably dialects of a single language; Circular Head may be a dialect as well.
  Although Circular Head (T12*) [NE strip of NW region on map] shares only half its vocabulary with Northwestern & Robbins Island, it cannot be ruled out as a dialect of the NW language due to the poor state of the data.
- Northern (T1) [N region on map]
  Probably a separate language, though it shares 50% of vocabulary with Piper River and cannot be ruled out as a dialect of the NE language.
- Port Sorell (T13*) [N coast of N Midlands region on map]
  It is "unlikely" there is a close genetic connection with any other Tasmanian language.
- Piper River (T14*), Cape Portland (T9*), and Ben Lomond (T7) [NE and Ben Lomond regions on map]
  These appear to form an interrelated group. Either the first two or all three could be dialects of a single language. May form a language with Northern, which is separated geographically by Port Sorell.
- North Midlands (T4) [central N Midlands region on map]
  "Must" be a distinct language.
- Oyster Bay (T2), Big River (T8*), and Little Swanport (T15*) [Oyster Bay and Big River on map]
  Oyster Bay and Big River share 85% of vocabulary and are very likely to be dialects. Little Swanport could be a dialect as well.
- South-eastern (T5) [SE region on map]
  Appears to be a distinct language from Oyster Bay / Big River.

The two western varieties are South-western (T10*) and Macquarie Harbour (T6) [southern and northern ends of SW region on map]

=== Bowern (2012) ===
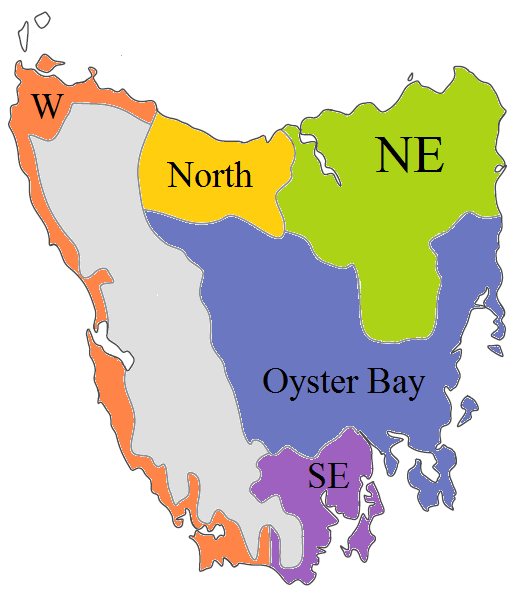
Tasmanian language families per Bowern (2012). Oyster Bay and SE are clearly related. Northern and Western may be as well.

One of the difficulties in interpreting Tasmanian data is the fact that some of the 35 word lists mix data from various locations, and even for the rest, in some cases the location is not recorded. Bowern (2012) used a clustering algorithm to identify language admixture, and further techniques to conclude that the 26 unmixed lists with more than 100 words record twelve Tasmanian varieties (at p < 0.15) that may be assumed to be distinct languages. Due to the poor attestation, these varieties have no names apart from the names of the wordlists they are recorded in. They fall into five clusters; Bayesian phylogenetic methods demonstrate that two of these are clearly related, but that the others cannot be related to each other (that is, they are separate language families) based on existing evidence. Given the length of human habitation on Tasmania, it should not be expected for the languages to be demonstrably related to each other. The families, and the number of attested languages, are:

- Tasmanian
  - Western Tasmanian (2–3) [T3, T6, T10, T11, T12]: Northwestern and Southwestern
  - Northern Tasmanian (2) [T1, T13]: Northern coast
  - Northeastern Tasmanian (3) [T4, T7, T9, T14]: Northeastern, Ben Lomond, and North Midlands
  - Eastern Tasmanian (5)
    - Oyster Bay (2) [T2, T8, T15]: Oyster Bay and Big River valley
    - Bruny (Southeastern Tasmanian) (3) [T5]: Bruny Island

Bowern identifies several of the wordlists of unknown provenance: The Norman list is northeastern, for example, while the Lhotsky and Blackhouse lists attest to an additional language in the northeastern family; the Fisher list is western, as are the Plomley lists, though with admixture. Two of the lists reported to be from Oyster Bay contain substantial northeastern admixture, which Bowern believes to be responsible for classifications linking the languages of the east coast.

Only 24 words, out of 3,412, are found in all five branches, and most of these are words for recently introduced items, such as guns and cattle, or cultural or mythological terms which could easily be borrowed. Thus there is no good evidence for a Tasmanian language family. There is, however, slight evidence that the northern and western families may be distantly related (the western varieties are especially poorly attested). The only words found in all regions that are not obvious candidates for borrowing and which do not have serious problems with attestation are *pene- 'laugh', *taway 'go', *liya 'water', *wii 'wood', and perhaps *tina 'belly'. However, there are other local words for 'laugh', 'water', and 'belly', and the reflexes of *taway are so similar as to be suspicious. *Wii is therefore the most promising; it is found as wiya, wina, wikina (-na is a common ending) and wii, glossed as wood, tree, brush, or timber. Although there is no evidence that the Tasmanian languages were related to the languages of mainland Australia (and if they were, they would presumably be related to languages which had been lost to the wave of Pama–Nyungan expansion), the fact that there is no established Tasmanian family should be kept in mind when attempting to establish such connections.

=== Lingua franca ===
Flinders Island lingua franca
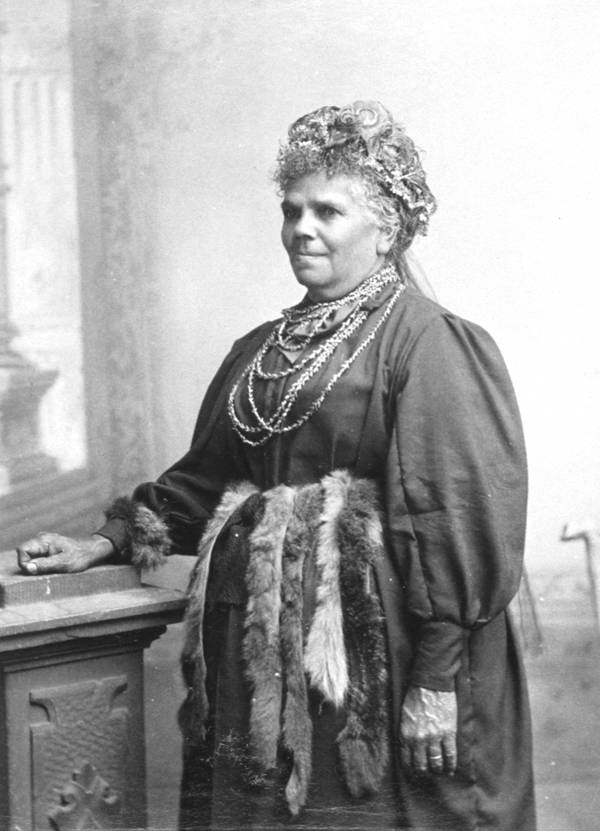
- Fanny Cochrane Smith, last speaker of the Flinders Island lingua franca
- Region: Flinders Island, Tasmania
- Ethnicity: Tasmanian
- Extinct: 1905, with the death of Fanny Cochrane Smith
- Language family: koine, creole, pidgin, or a mixed language, based on the Eastern and Northeastern Tasmanian languages

Language codes
- ISO 639-3: –

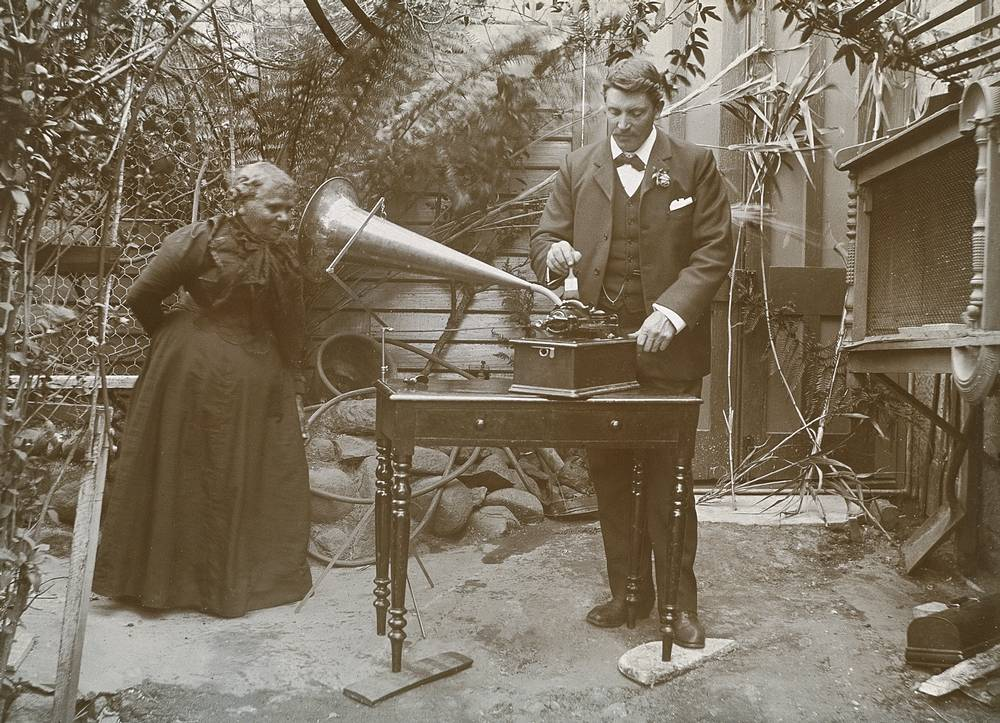
Recording the songs of Fanny Cochrane Smith by using a phonograph.

1903 recording

It is unknown if the Tasmanian lingua franca was a koine, creole, pidgin, or mixed language. However, its vocabulary was evidently predominantly that of the eastern and the northeastern languages because of the dominance of those peoples on the settlements.

=== Bass Strait Pidgin ===
The unattested Bass Strait Pidgin of Flinders Island consisted primarily of English vocabulary, but is reported to have had a mixture of words from Tasmanian languages, introduced by the women whom the island's sealers had abducted from Tasmania.

=== palawa kani ===
Palawa kani is a constructed language project, built from a composite of surviving words from various Tasmanian Aboriginal languages.

== Grammar ==
The phonology is uncertain, due to the poor nature of the transcriptions. See Eastern Tasmanian languages for one reconstruction; this article also covers other aspects of grammar, with some comparison to other Tasmanian languages.

== Vocabulary ==
Some basic words:

nanga 'father'
poa 'mother' (Northeast)
pögöli-na 'sun'
wīta 'moon'
romtö-na 'star'
pö ön'e-na 'bird'
wī-na 'tree'
poime-na 'mountain'
waltomo-na 'river' (Northeast)
nani 'stone'

The difficulty in analysing the records is apparent in the conflicting recorded forms for the words for "two" ("Fr" means a French transcription):

Tasmanian words for "two"
| Region | Transcription | Possible pronunciation |
|---|---|---|
| South- eastern | pooalih | [puwali] |
| South- eastern | bõw.lȳ | [pawuli] |
| South- eastern | boula (Fr) | [pula] |
| South- eastern | boulla (Fr) | [pula] |
| South- eastern | bura | [pura] |
| South- eastern | bourai (Fr) | [pure] |
| South- eastern | cal.a.ba.wa | [kalapawa] |
| North- eastern | calabawa | [kalapawa] |
| North- eastern | kar.te.pew.er | [katapiwa] |
| North- eastern | kateboueve (Fr) | [katapuwe(?)] |
| North- eastern | narn.ne.meen.er | [nanamina] |
| North- eastern | nar.ner.pee | [nanapi] |
| North- eastern | par.le.the.meen.er | [palatamina] |
| North- eastern | pay'ãnĕrbĕrwãr | [peyanapawa] |
| North- western | may | [me] |
| North- western | nue.won.ner | [nyuwana] |
| North- western | neu.on.ne | [nyuwana] |
| North- western | py.at.er.lare | [payatale] |
| North- western | pie.nare.re.pare | [paynerape] |
| North- western | by.ar.ty | [payatay] |
| Oyster Bay | py.wer | [paywa] |
| Oyster Bay | pye.er.wer | [payawa] |
| Oyster Bay | pye.er.wer | [payawa] |
| Oyster Bay | pia-wah | [payawa] |

Given the possibility that suffixes are responsible for some of the differences, there are still clearly several distinct words, though it is difficult to say how many or what their forms were.

== Bibliography ==
- Schmidt, Wilhelm (1952). Die Tasmanischen Sprachen: Quellen, Gruppierungen, Grammatik, Wörterbücher [The Tasmanian languages: Sources, Groupings, Grammar, Dictionaries]. Utrecht & Antwerp: Spectrum Publishers.
- Crowley, Terry; Dixon, R.M.W. (1981). "Tasmanian". In Dixon, R. M. W.; Blake, B. J. (eds.). Handbook of Australian Languages. Vol. 2. Amsterdam: John Benjamins Publishing Company. pp. 395–421. doi:10.1075/z.hal2.09cro. ISBN 978-90-272-2004-2.
- Bowern, Claire; Lau, Tyler; & Plomley, N. J. B. (2019). Plomley (1976) Data on the Languages of Tasmania (Version 1) [Data set]. Zenodo. doi:10.5281/zenodo.2667301
- Plomley, N. J. B. (1976). A Word-list of the Tasmanian Aboriginal Languages. Launceston. ISBN 0724601988.
- Wurm, Stephen; Mühlhäusler, Peter; Tryon, Darrell T. (1996). Atlas of languages of intercultural communication in the Pacific, Asia and the Americas. De Gruyter Mouton. ISBN 3110134179.
- Robinson, George Augustus (1829-1834). A7023-A7031: field journals, Tasmania. Manuscripts held at the Mitchell Library, Sydney. (A7085 contains word lists)
