= Claire Bowern =

Australian linguist

Claire Louise Bowern
- Occupation: Linguist
- Known for: Computational phylogenetic classification of the Pama-Nyungan language family
- Title: Professor
- Awards: Kenneth L. Hale Award

Academic background
- Education: Australian National University (BA); Harvard University (MA, PhD)
- Thesis: Bardi Verb Morphology in Historical Perspective (2004)
- Doctoral advisor: Jay Jasanoff, Calvert Watkins

Academic work
- Discipline: Linguistics
- Sub-discipline: Australian Aboriginal languages, historical linguistics, language documentation
- Institutions: The Australian National University; Rice University; Yale University
- Website: Yale University webpage

Claire Louise Bowern (/ˈboʊərn/ BOH-ərn) is a linguist who works with Australian Indigenous languages. She is currently a professor of linguistics at Yale University, and has a secondary appointment in the department of anthropology at Yale.

== Career ==
Bowern received her PhD from Harvard University in 2004, under the advisement of Jay Jasanoff and Calvert Watkins. Her dissertation was about Bardi, a Nyulnyulan language, and its verbal morphology, both diachronically and synchronically. In 2007, the NSF/NEH awarded her a grant to study Bardi texts from the 1920s. The thesis also included a sketch grammar of Bardi, as well as the first attempted reconstruction of Proto-Nyulnyulan.

She is the author of two widely used linguistics textbooks, Linguistic Fieldwork: A Practical Guide and An Introduction to Historical Linguistics.

=== Chirila ===
At Yale, Bowern founded the Contemporary and Historical Reconstruction in the Indigenous Languages of Australia database (Chirila), through the Yale Pama-Nyungan Lab. The name for the database was inspired by both the motivations of the project and the word for "echidna" in many Western Desert languages, tyirilya. Bowern's interest in the historical linguistics of Australian languages has directed the lab to collect lexical data for a more thorough accounting of the composition of the Pama-Nyungan language family.

=== Service ===
Since 2015 she has been the vice president of the Endangered Language Fund.

As of March 2022 Bowern is on the editorial review board for the following publications:

- Language Dynamics and Change (editorial board)
- Diachronica (executive editor)
- Transactions of the Philological Society (editorial board)
- Routledge Studies in Historical Linguistics (series editor)
- EL Publishing (advisory board)
- Conceptual Foundations of Language Science (editorial board)

Bowern was previously an associate editor of Language, specifically responsible for the historical linguistics and language documentation areas from 2012 to 2016.

== Awards and honors ==
The Kenneth L. Hale Award was awarded to her in 2014, for her documentation work on Bardi.

In 2020, Bowern was inducted as a Fellow of the Linguistic Society of America.

In 2023, Bowern was elected a new member of the American Academy of Arts and Sciences and as Fellow of the American Association for the Advancement of Science. 2026 saw her elected a Corresponding Fellow of the Australian Academy of the Humanities.

== Key publications ==
- 2004: Bowern, Claire and Harold Koch (eds). Australian Languages: Classification and the Comparative Method. Benjamins
- 2008: Bowern, Claire. Linguistic Fieldwork: A practical guide. Palgrave. (Online Materials) (2nd Edition 2015)
- 2010: Bowern, Claire and Terry Crowley. An Introduction to Historical Linguistics. Oxford/New York: Oxford University Press. Fourth edition.
- 2011: Bowern, Claire. Sivisa Titan: Sketch Grammar, Texts, Vocabulary Based on Material Collected by P. Josef Meier and Po Minis. University of Hawaii Press.
- 2012: Bowern, Claire. A Grammar of Bardi. Mouton de Gruyter.
- 2014: Bowern, Claire and Bethwyn Evans (eds). Routledge Handbook of Historical Linguistics. Basingstoke: Routledge.
- 2018: Bowern, Clare., Bouckaert, R.R., & Atkinson, Q.D. The origin and expansion of Pama–Nyungan languages across Australia. Nat Ecol Evol 2, 741–749 (2018). https://doi.org/10.1038/s41559-018-0489-3
- 2023: Bowern, Claire (ed.). The Oxford Guide to Australian Languages. Oxford University Press.
