= Mid Woody Islet =

Islet in Tasmania, Australia

Coordinates: 40°17′S 148°06′E

Mid Woody Islet is a small island, with an area of 0.66 ha, in south-eastern Australia. It is part of Tasmania’s Tin Kettle Island Group, lying in eastern Bass Strait between Flinders and Cape Barren Islands in the Furneaux Group. The island is joined at low tide to nearby Anderson, Little Anderson and Tin Kettle Islands by extensive intertidal mudflats. The island is part of the Franklin Sound Islands Important Bird Area, identified as such by BirdLife International because it holds over 1% of the world populations of six bird species.

== Fauna ==
Recorded breeding seabird and wader species are little penguin, Pacific gull, sooty oystercatcher and white-fronted tern.

== See also ==
- List of islands of Tasmania
