= Long Island (Tasmania) =

Island in Tasmania, Australia

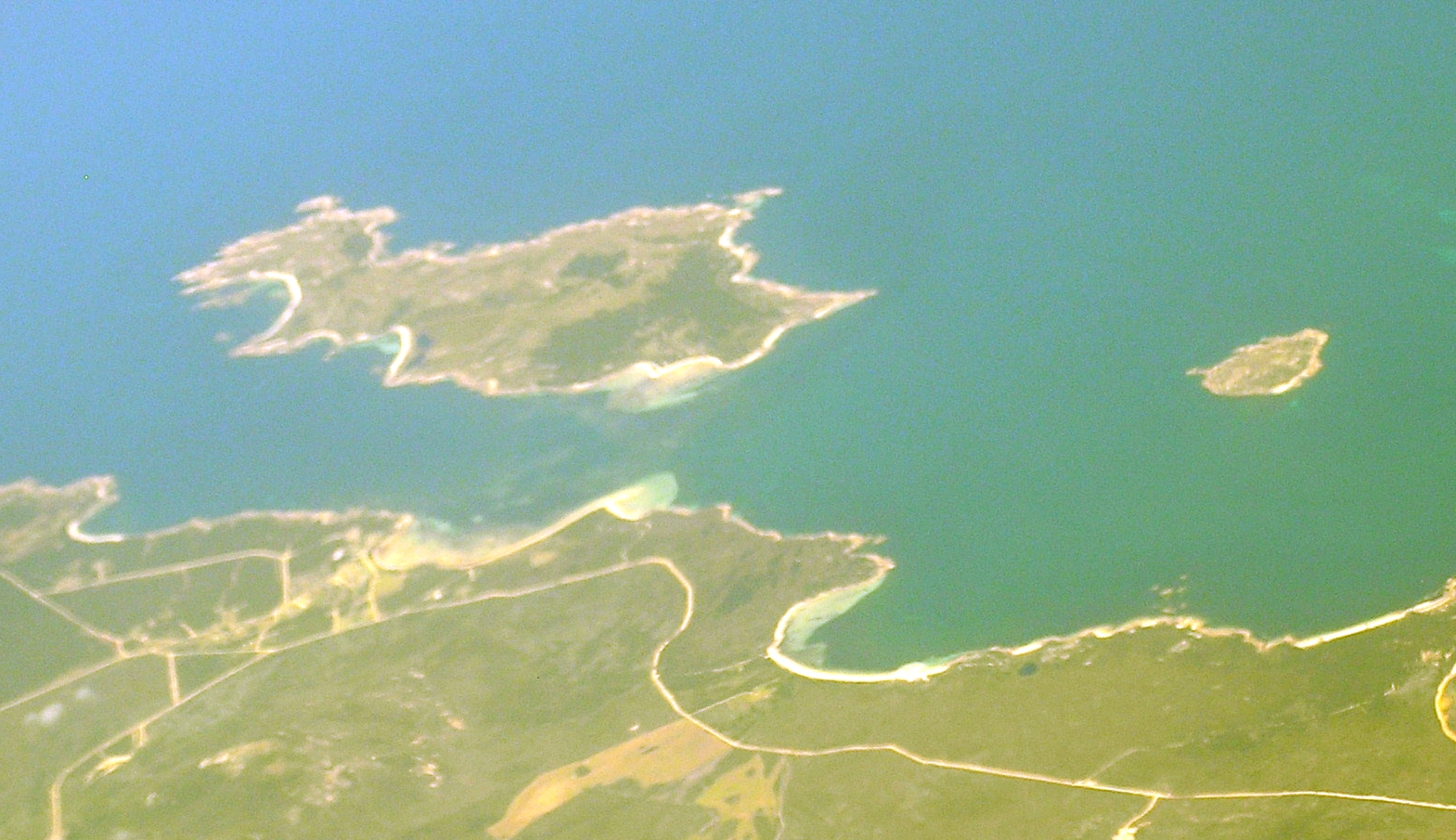
- View from south-east from Cape Barren Island (below) towards Long Island (upper left) and the smaller Doughboy Island (upper right).

- Location within Tasmania

Geography
- Location: Bass Strait
- Archipelago: Long Island Group, part of the Furneaux Group
- Area: 313 ha (770 acres)

Administration
- Australia
- State: Tasmania

The Long Island, part of the Long Island Group within the Furneaux Group, is a 313-hectare (770-acre) unpopulated granite and dolerite island, located in Bass Strait, lying north-west of the Cape Barren Island in Tasmania, in south-eastern Australia. The island is part of the Franklin Sound Islands Important Bird Area, identified as such by BirdLife International because it holds over 1% of the world populations of six bird species.

== History ==
The island was first settled in the early 19th century and was intended to be the main centre of habitation in the Furneaux Group. Due to the island's small size the settlers, at one stage numbering a hundred, outgrew the island resources. The population, having to relocate or face starvation, moved to adjacent Cape Barren Island. Long Island was Australia's first post office south of Sydney. It is currently not permanently inhabited and is used to graze sheep.

== Flora and fauna ==
Much of Long Island has been heavily grazed and regularly burnt over a long period. There are patches of remnant Melaleuca scrub at the western end of the island, and the southernmost community of Melaleuca armillaris in Australia is found here. Recorded breeding seabird, wader and waterbird species include little penguin, Pacific gull, silver gull, sooty oystercatcher, pied oystercatcher, hooded plover, Cape Barren goose, black swan and grey teal. Reptiles present include the metallic skink, spotted skink, eastern three-lined skink and lowland copperhead. The Tasmanian pademelon is present however numbers have greatly reduced in the last year. Feral goats have been eradicated. The island is currently undergoing a weed management program, mainly trying to remove box thorn.

== See also ==
- List of islands of Tasmania
