= Little Dog Island =

Island in Tasmania, Australia

Coordinates: 40°15′S 148°12′E

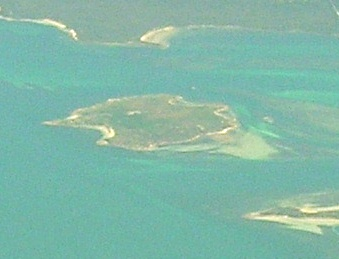
Little Dog Is from east

Little Dog Island is a square, flat granite island, with an area of 83 ha, in south-eastern Australia. It is part of Tasmania’s Great Dog Island Group, lying in eastern Bass Strait between Flinders and Cape Barren Islands in the Furneaux Group. It is a game reserve. It was previously grazed, a usage now ceased. The island is part of the Franklin Sound Islands Important Bird Area, identified as such by BirdLife International because it holds over 1% of the world populations of six bird species.

== History ==
Bass Strait sealer, John Maynard, and Margery, the widow of sealer James Munro, were found here with their families in 1861, probably for the mutton bird harvest.

== Fauna ==
Recorded breeding seabird and wader species are little penguin, short-tailed shearwater (over half a million pairs) and pied oystercatcher. The sooty oystercatcher, Caspian tern and white-fronted tern have bred on an isolated rock 200 m north of the island. The swamp harrier has bred on the island. Reptiles present include the metallic skink and tiger snake. The growling grass frog has been recorded.

== See also ==
- List of islands of Tasmania
