= Oyster Rocks =

Island in Tasmania, Australia

Coordinates: 40°17′S 148°03′E

The Oyster Rocks are a close pair of small granite islands with a combined area of about 6 ha in south-eastern Australia. They are part of Tasmania's Tin Kettle Island Group, lying in eastern Bass Strait between Flinders and Cape Barren Islands in the Furneaux Group. They are a conservation area. The islands are part of the Franklin Sound Islands Important Bird Area, identified as such by BirdLife International because it holds over 1% of the world populations of six bird species.

== Fauna ==
Recorded breeding seabird and wader species are little penguin, short-tailed shearwater, white-faced storm-petrel, Pacific gull, silver gull, sooty oystercatcher, Caspian tern and Cape Barren goose. Black-faced cormorants nest on the smaller western islet. The metallic skink is present.

== See also ==
- List of islands of Tasmania
