= Neds Reef =

Group of islets in Tasmania, Australia

Coordinates: 40°19′S 148°04′E

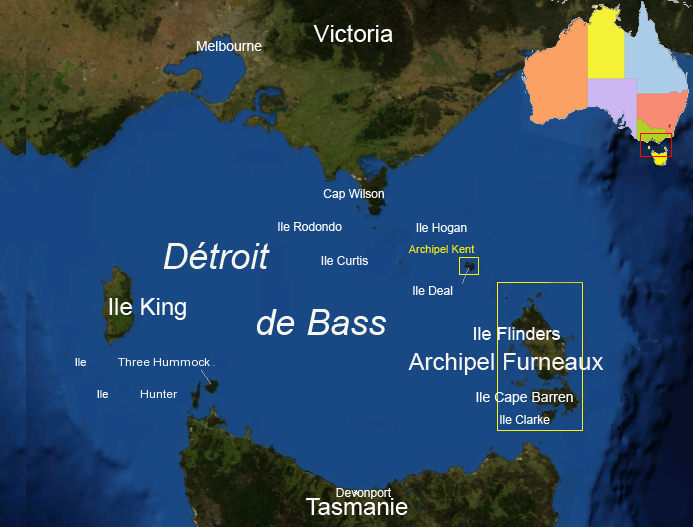
Bass Strait.

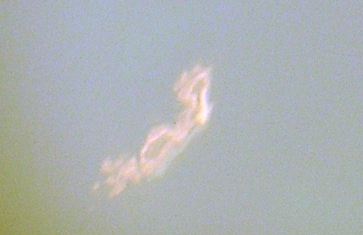
Neds Reef

Neds Reef is a group of three small granite islets, joined at low tide by extensive mudflats, with a combined area of about 3 ha, in south-eastern Australia. They are part of Tasmania’s Tin Kettle Island Group, lying in eastern Bass Strait between Flinders and Cape Barren Islands in the Furneaux Group. The reef is part of the Franklin Sound Islands Important Bird Area, identified as such by BirdLife International because it holds over 1% of the world populations of six bird species.

== Fauna ==
Recorded breeding seabird and wader species are little penguin, Pacific gull, silver gull, sooty oystercatcher, Caspian tern and white-fronted tern.

== See also ==
- List of islands of Tasmania
