= Briggs Islet =

Island in Tasmania, Australia

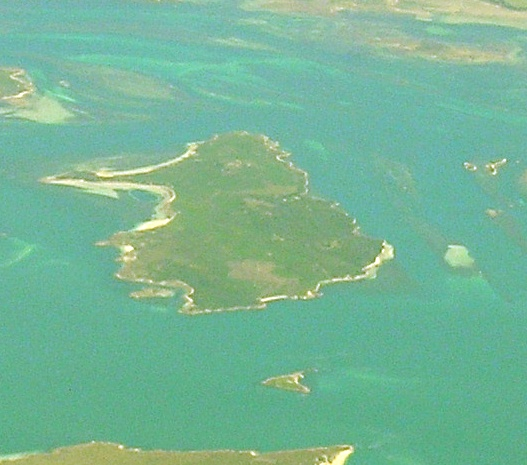
- Briggs Islet appears below Great Dog Island in this picture

- Location within Tasmania

Geography
- Location: Bass Strait
- Coordinates: 40°15′S 148°16′E
- Archipelago: Great Dog Island Group
- Area: 3.4 ha (8.4 acres)

Administration
- Australia
- State: Tasmania

Briggs Islet is a small granite island, with an area of 3.4 ha, in south-eastern Australia. It is part of Tasmania’s Great Dog Island Group, lying in eastern Bass Strait between Flinders and Cape Barren Islands in the Furneaux Group. It is a conservation area. The island is part of the Franklin Sound Islands Important Bird Area, identified as such by BirdLife International because it holds over 1% of the world populations of six bird species.

== Fauna ==
Recorded breeding seabird and wader species are little penguin, white-faced storm-petrel, Pacific gull, silver gull, sooty oystercatcher, Caspian tern, crested tern and white-fronted tern.

== See also ==
- List of islands of Tasmania
