= Little Anderson Island =

Island in Tasmania, Australia

Coordinates: 40°17′S 148°06′E

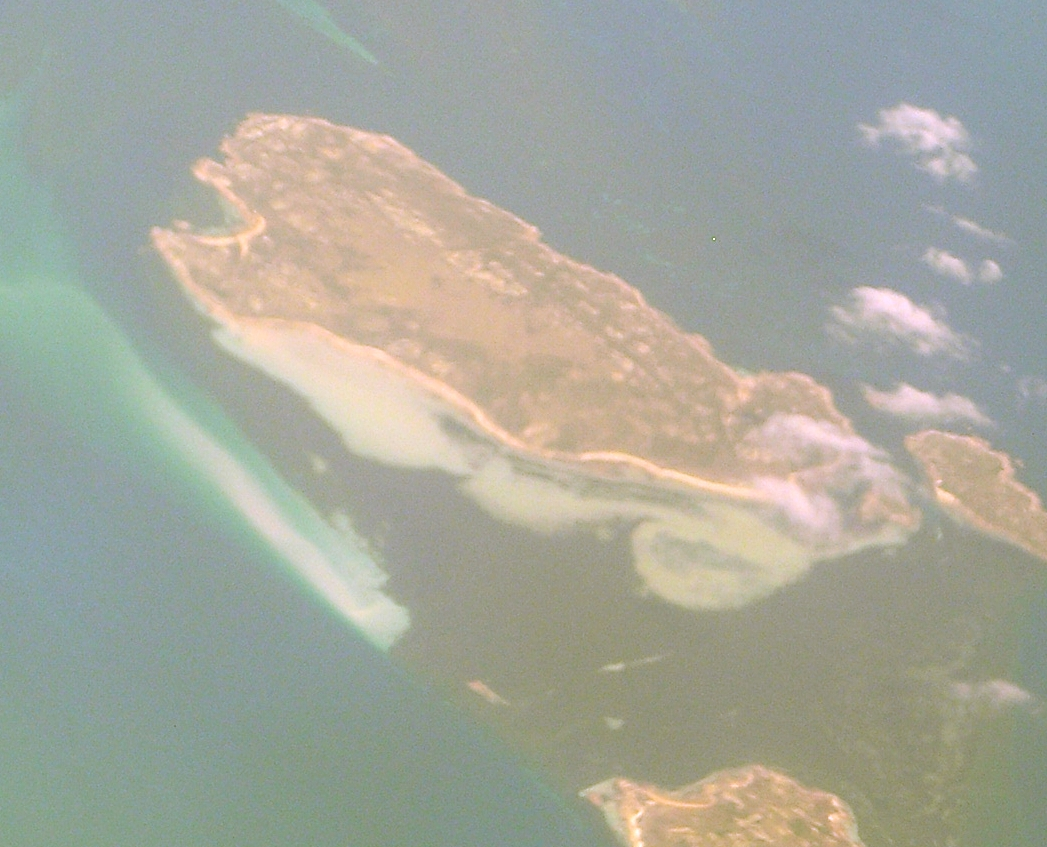
Little Anderson Island is the small island on the right hand side.

Little Anderson Island is an island, with an area of 13 ha, in south-eastern Australia. It is part of Tasmania’s Tin Kettle Island Group, lying in eastern Bass Strait between Flinders and Cape Barren Islands in the Furneaux Group. The island is joined at low tide to nearby Anderson and Tin Kettle Islands by extensive intertidal mudflats. The island is part of the Franklin Sound Islands Important Bird Area, identified as such by BirdLife International because it holds over 1% of the world populations of six bird species.

== Fauna ==
Recorded breeding seabird and wader species are little penguin, sooty oystercatcher and pied oystercatcher. Reptiles present include the metallic skink, spotted skink and Bougainville's skink.

== See also ==
- List of islands of Tasmania
