= Doughboy Island (Tasmania) =

Island in Tasmania, Australia

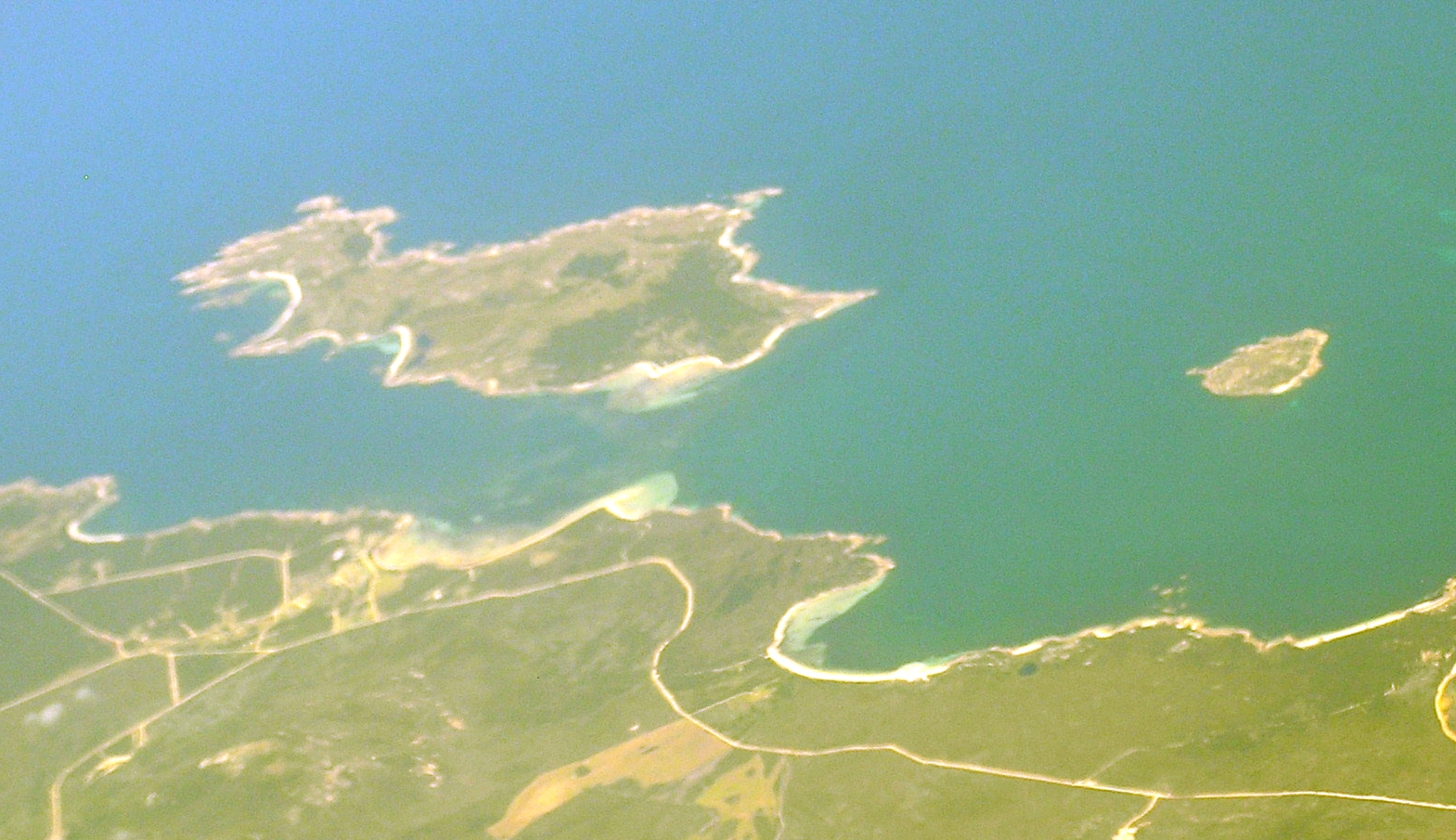
- Doughboy Island (top right), taken from the south east.

- Location within Tasmania

Geography
- Location: Bass Strait
- Coordinates: 40°20′24″S 148°03′00″E
- Archipelago: Tin Kettle Group, part of the Furneaux Group
- Area: 30 ha (74 acres)

Administration
- Australia
- State: Tasmania

The Doughboy Island, part of the Tin Kettle Group within the Furneaux Group, is a 30-hectare (74-acre) unpopulated mainly granite island, located in Bass Strait, lying west of the Flinders and Cape Barren islands, Tasmania, in south-eastern Australia.

The island has been devastated by irresponsible farming practices and fire.

== Fauna ==
Recorded breeding seabird and wader species are little penguin, Pacific gull and sooty oystercatcher. The metallic skink is present.

== See also ==
- List of islands of Tasmania
