= Anderson Island (Tasmania) =

Island in Tasmania, Australia

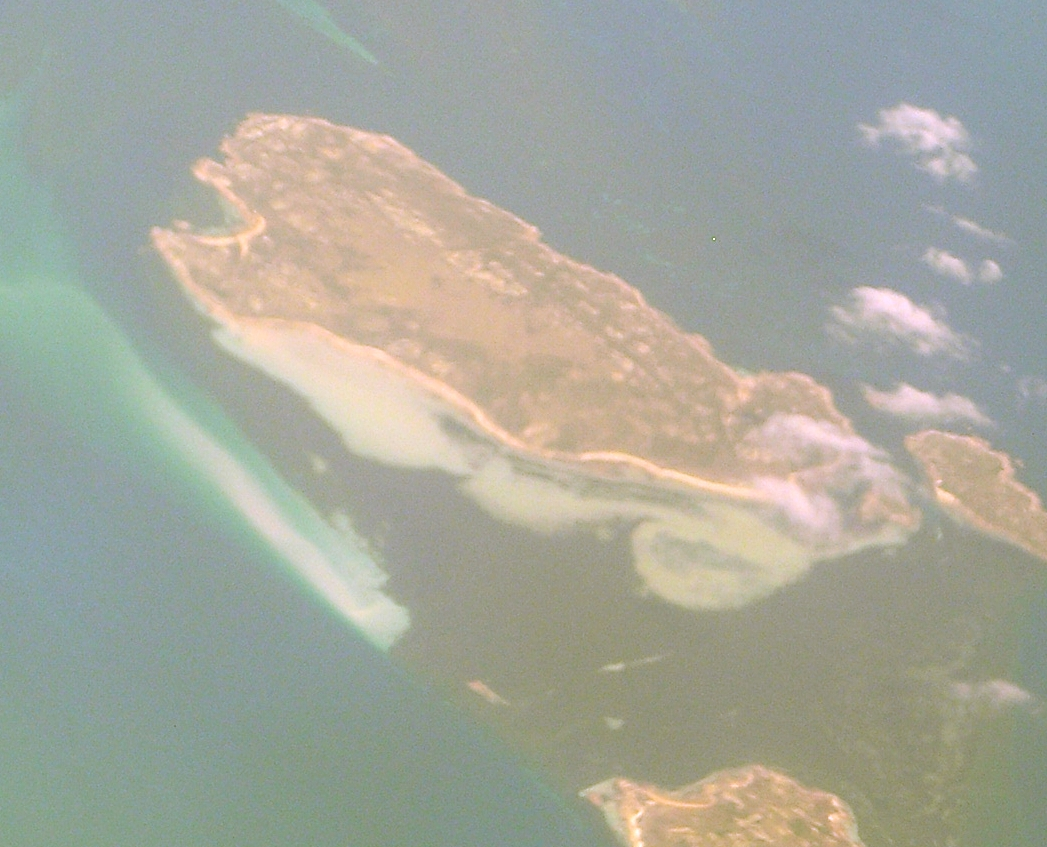
- Anderson Island

- Location within Tasmania

Geography
- Location: Bass Strait
- Coordinates: 40°18′10″S 148°06′35″E
- Archipelago: Furneaux Group
- Area: 1.66 km^{2} (0.64 sq mi)

Administration
- Australia
- State: Tasmania
- LGA: Municipality of Flinders Island

Demographics
- Population: 0 (2018)

Anderson Island, also known as Woody Island, part of the Tin Kettle Island Group of the Furneaux Group, is a 166-hectare (410-acre) granite island, located in Bass Strait off the northeast coast of the Tasmanian mailand, in south-eastern Australia. Anderson Island lies between Flinders and Cape Barren Islands and is partly covered by a pastoral lease enabling the grazing of sheep and cattle. The island is joined at low tide to nearby Little Anderson and Tin Kettle Islands by extensive intertidal mudflats. The island is supposedly named after John Anderson, a sealer living on the island by 1842.

The island is part of the Franklin Sound Islands Important Bird Area, identified as such by BirdLife International because it holds over 1% of the world populations of six bird species.

== History ==
“Sealers”, and their Aboriginal partners, were reported living, intermittently, on the island from the 1820s. When George Augustus Robinson, Protector of Aborigines, visited the island in November 1830, he found there George Robinson (no relation) and James Everett and their Aboriginal “wives.” Captain Pasco of the survey vessel Vansittart visited in 1842 and found John Anderson (alias “Abyssinia Jack”) in residence with his family. When the Isabella of Leith was wrecked on the coast of Flinders Island in 1844, thirteen of the passengers and crew reached Anderson Island in a long boat where they were given shelter by the sealers.

== Flora and fauna ==
Most of the island's original vegetation has disappeared, replaced by pasture for livestock. There are a few remnant patches of Melaleuca and Stipa around the coast.

Recorded breeding seabird and wader species are little penguin, Pacific gull, sooty oystercatcher and pied oystercatcher. There used to be a large short-tailed shearwater colony on the western side of the island until the early 20th century, when it was destroyed through the introduction of pigs, which dug up the burrows and ate the eggs and chicks. The metallic skink is present.

== Development Proposals ==
In 2017 it was proposed that housing and some community facilities could be built on Anderson Island. Due to the conservation status of the island, though, this never occurred: it would likely have damaged the sooty oystercatcher colony and devastated the species. The proposal was to include parks, beaches, shops, schools and room for 500 people, significantly increasing the population of the Flinders Island Region.

== See also ==
- List of islands of Tasmania
