= Pelican Island (Tasmania) =

Island in Tasmania, Australia

Coordinates: 40°18′S 148°19′E

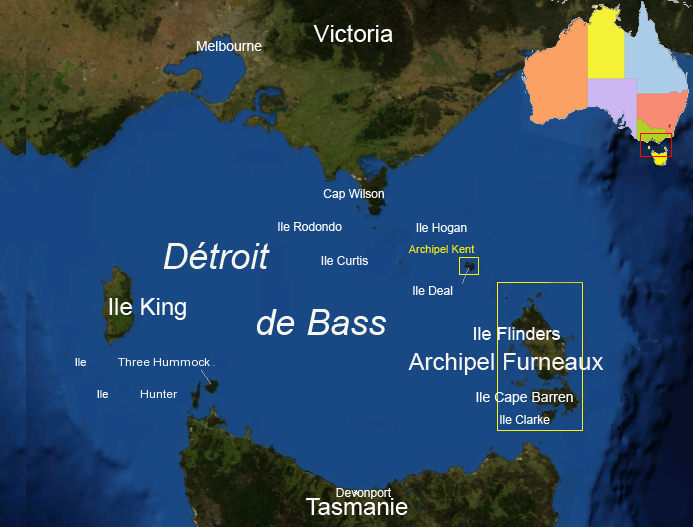
Map of the Pelican Island region

Pelican Island is an island, with an area of 6.8 ha (17 acres) including an associated reef joined to it at low tide, in south-eastern Australia. It is part of Tasmania’s Vansittart Island Group, lying in eastern Bass Strait between Flinders and Cape Barren Islands in the Furneaux Group. Until 1984 it was leased for grazing. The island is part of the Franklin Sound Islands Important Bird Area, identified as such by BirdLife International because it holds over 1% of the world populations of six bird species.

== Fauna ==
Recorded breeding seabird and wader species are short-tailed shearwater, white-faced storm-petrel, Pacific gull, Caspian tern and sooty oystercatcher. An unidentified skink is present and there is evidence of the presence of feral cats.

== See also ==
- List of islands of Tasmania
