= Ram Island (Tasmania) =

Island in Tasmania, Australia

Coordinates: 40°18′S 148°12′E

Ram Island is a small island, with an area of 66 acres, in south-eastern . Located in the Estuary of Little Swansport on the East Coast of Tasmania south of Swansea township.

== Wildlife ==
BirdLife International identifies Ram Island as part of the Franklin Sound Islands Important Bird Area because it holds over 1% of the world populations of six bird species.

== Flora and fauna ==
Recorded breeding seabird, waterbird and wader species are little penguin, Pacific gull, sooty oystercatcher, white-faced storm-petrel, black-faced cormorant, Caspian tern and Cape Barren goose.
