= Franklin Sound Islands Important Bird Area =

Important Bird Area in Tasmania, Australia

Coordinates: 40°17′14″S 148°12′02″E

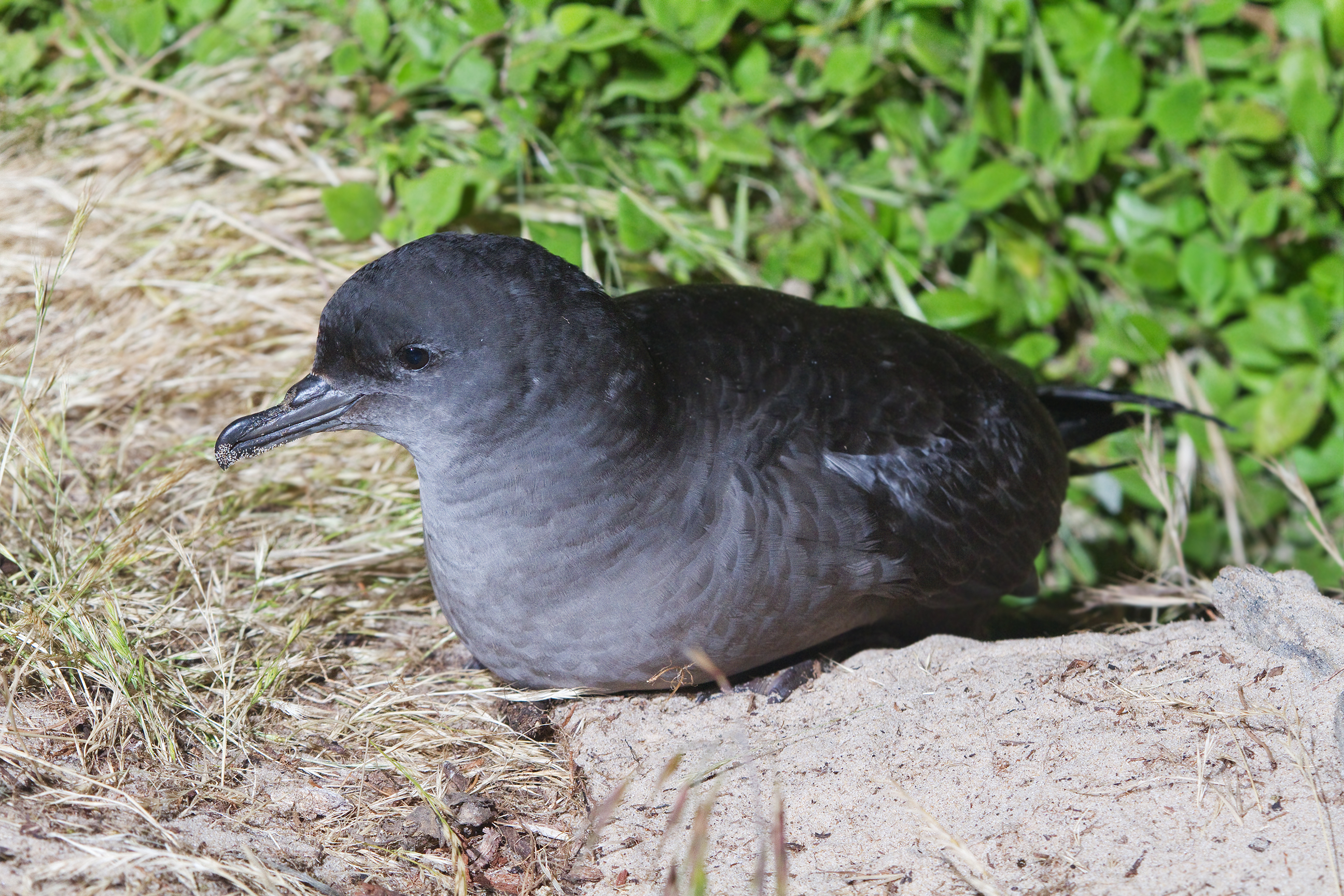
The islands in the IBA hold over 1.3 million nesting burrows of the short-tailed shearwater, or Tasmanian muttonbird

The Franklin Sound Islands Important Bird Area comprises several small islands, with a collective total area of 1725 ha, lying in Franklin Sound between the much larger Flinders Island to the north and Cape Barren Island to the south, in the Furneaux Group of Tasmania, Australia.

The islands have been identified by BirdLife International as an Important Bird Area (IBA) because they support over 1% of the global populations of the Cape Barren goose, short-tailed shearwater, white-faced storm-petrel, black-faced cormorant, sooty oystercatcher and Pacific gull.

Islands in the Franklin Sound islands IBA include:

Vansittart Island Group

- Vansittart Island
- Ram Island
- Pelican Island

Great Dog Island Group

- Little Dog Island
- Great Dog Island
- Briggs Islet
- Little Green Island
- Spences Reefs

Tin Kettle Island Group

- Anderson Island
- Little Anderson Island
- Mid Woody Islet
- Tin Kettle Island
- Oyster Rocks
- Neds Reef

Long Island Group

- Long Island
