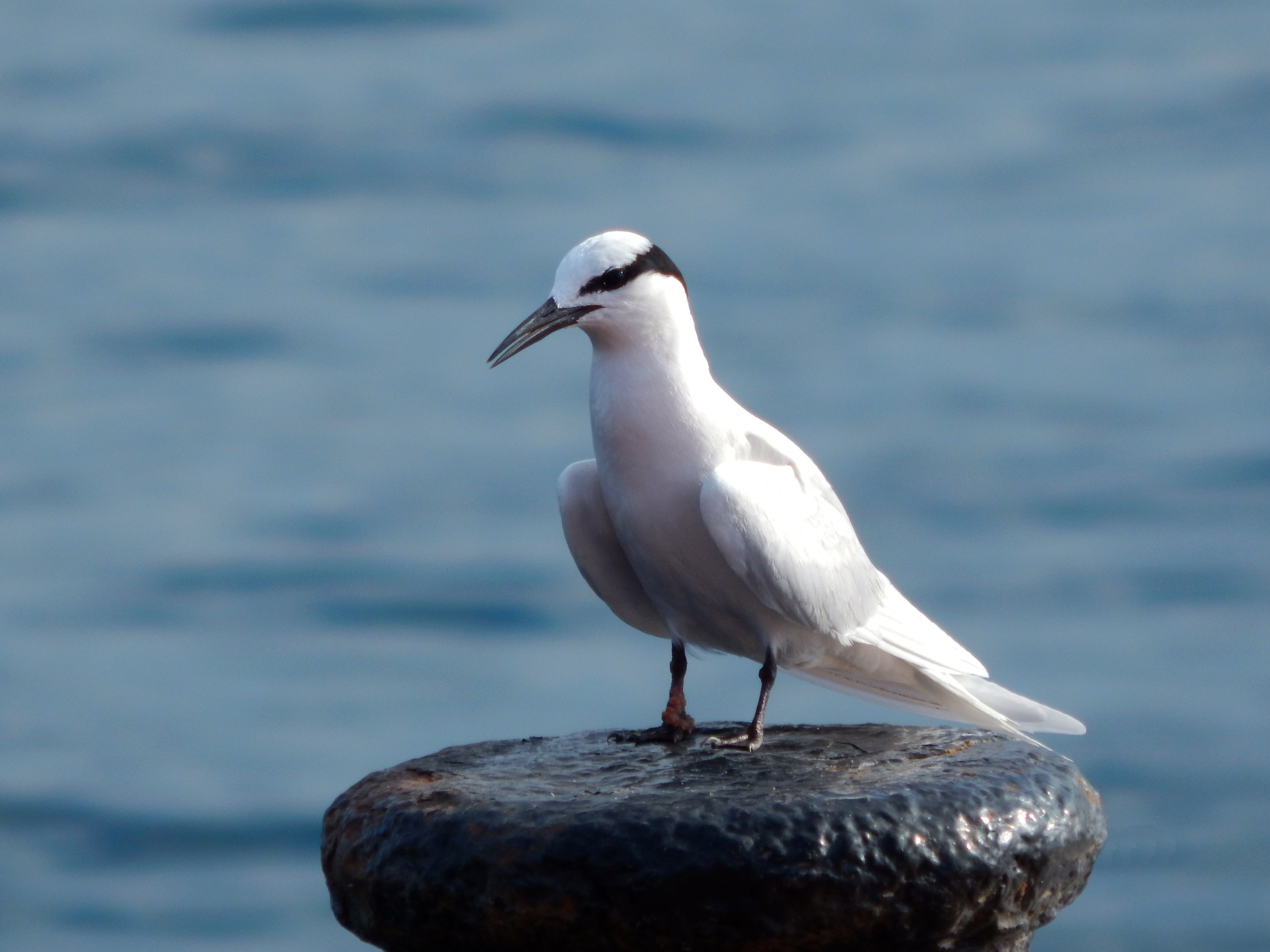
- S. s. sumatrana, in the Andaman Islands, India

Conservation status
- Least Concern (IUCN 3.1)

Scientific classification
- Kingdom: Animalia
- Phylum: Chordata
- Class: Aves
- Order: Charadriiformes
- Family: Laridae
- Genus: Sterna
- Species: S. sumatrana

Binomial name
- Sterna sumatrana Raffles, 1822

Synonyms
- Sterna melanauchen Temminck, CJ, 1827

= Black-naped tern =

Species of bird

The black-naped tern (Sterna sumatrana) is an oceanic tern mostly found in tropical and subtropical areas of the Indian Ocean and western Pacific Ocean. It is rarely found inland. It was described from the islands around Sumatra. It is most closely related to roseate tern S. dougallii and white-fronted tern S. striata.

== Description ==
The black-naped tern is named from the black band beginning at the eyes connecting behind the head and descending the back of the neck. The rest of its plumage is white, with pale silvery-grey wings and mantle, apart from the outermost primary feather which has a narrow black outer web. The tail is white, and deeply forked, extending (like the related roseate and white-fronted terns) beyond the wingtips on perched birds. The beak and legs are black. It has a body length of 30–35 cm (12–14 in) and a wingspan of 66 cm (26 in). Adults weigh between 97 and 120 g (3.4 and 4.2 oz). Hatchlings are mottled brown.

== Taxonomy ==
Sterna sumatrana matthewsi in Maldives

There are two listed subspecies:

- Sterna sumatrana sumatrana (Raffles, 1822) – islands of the eastern Indian Ocean through to the western Pacific, north to Taiwan and south to Queensland in Australia
- Sterna sumatrana mathewsi (Stresemann, 1914) – islands of the western Indian Ocean

== Distribution and habitat ==
The black-naped tern inhabits rocky shores throughout the Western-Pacific and Indian oceans, migrating yearly to islets and islands serving as breeding grounds.

== Behaviour ==
Lady Elliot Island, Qld, Australia

=== Hunting and diet ===
Like most terns, this species hunts by diving; they partially breach the surface of the water and directly capture their prey carrying it horizontally in their beak. Most hunt alone at sea, but hunt closer to shore in the surf when feeding nestlings and mates.

==== Diet ====
The diet consists of small fish up to 10 cm long, including those in families:

- Atherinidae (hardyheads and sprats);
- Engraulidae (anchovies);
- Hemiramphidae (garfish);
- Exocoetidae (flying fish);
- Mugilidae (mullet);
- Sphyroenidae (barracudas);
- Carangidae (trevally or jacks);
- and Scombridae (tuna).

=== Reproduction and development ===
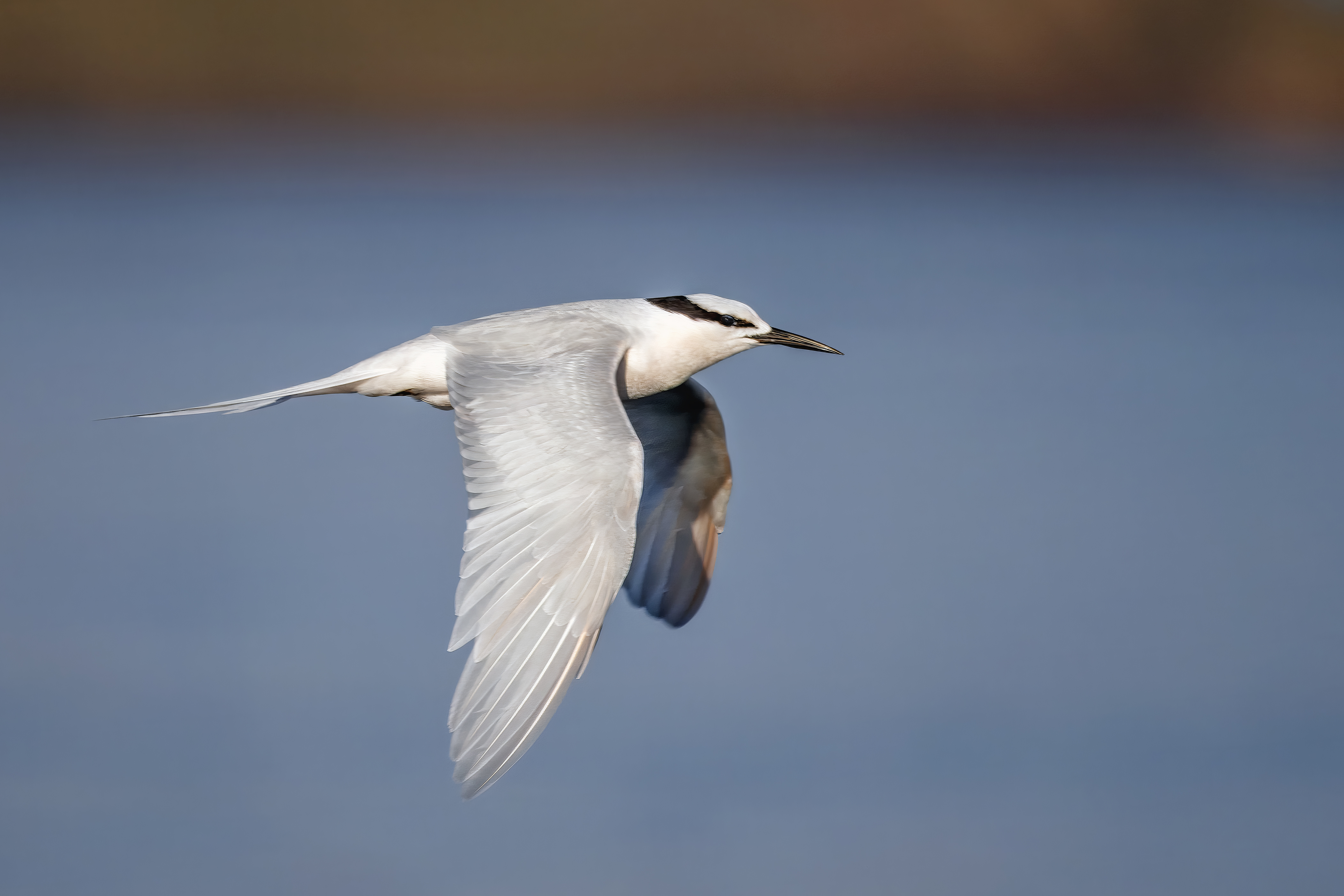
Breeding plumage

==== Breeding grounds ====
The black-naped tern breeds on oceanic islands in small colonies of 5–20 pairs, occasionally up to 200. Nests are made past high tide in depressions in sand or rock, sometimes delineated with shells or coral fragments, otherwise with little preparation. The rocky outcrops may be returned to yearly during the breeding season.

==== Laying period ====
Laying time varies from May to December depending on the location of the colony. Egg laying begins in India and Polynesia in May, followed by colonies in the Philippines in July, north-east Australia in September, oceanic Indian colonies from September to November, and the Great Barrier Reef from November to December. Leading up to egg laying, the male feeds the female her daily requirement of fish.

==== Clutch size and brooding ====
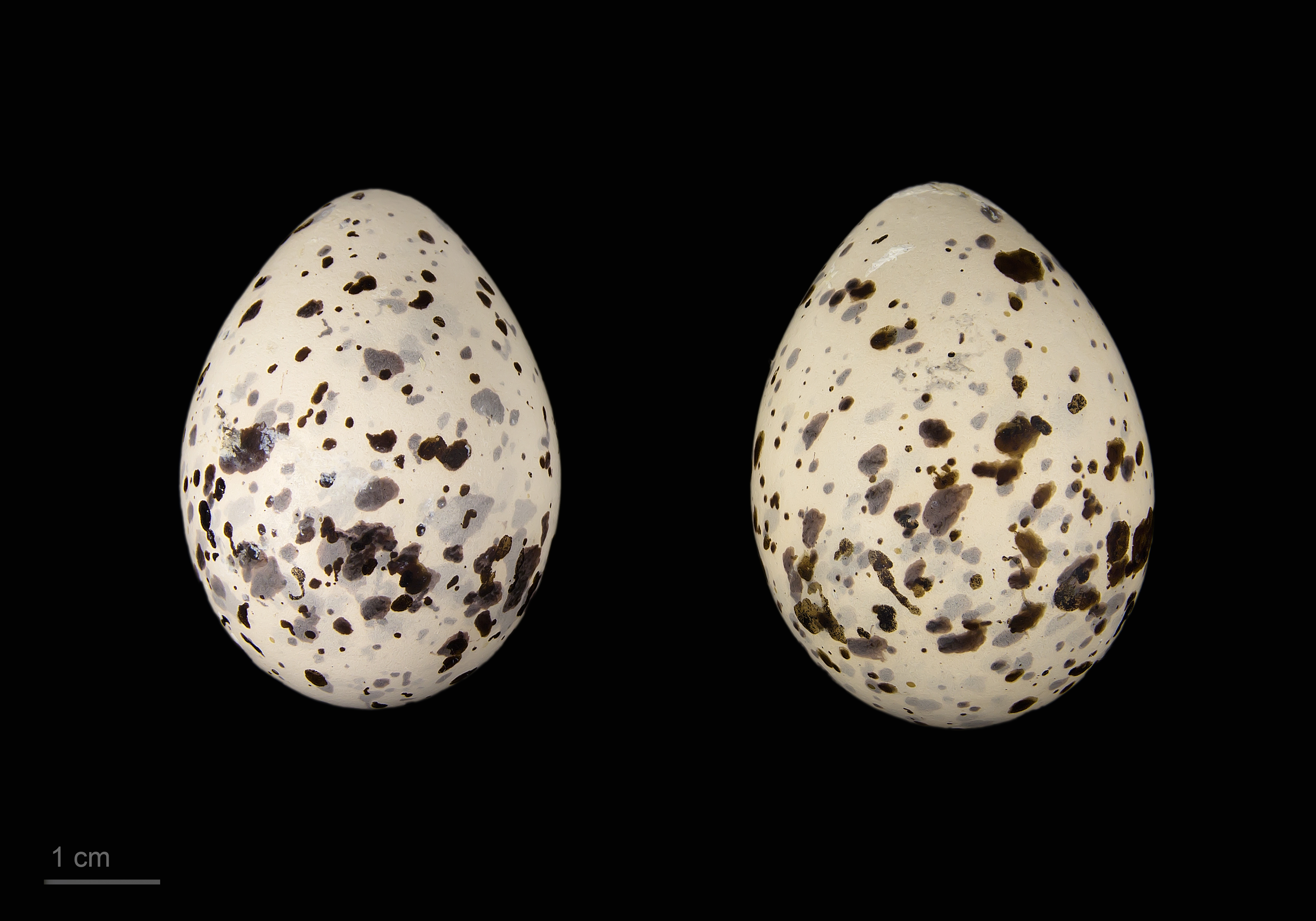
Sterna sumatrana eggs, MHNT

Clutch size varies from island to island, between 1 and 3 eggs per pair. Both mates take shifts incubating the eggs for 21–23 days; shifts last anywhere between 4 minutes and 7 hours. Once the chicks hatch, the mates alternate in feeding and brooding for the first 7 days. As the chicks reach later stages of development, the mates hunt simultaneously.

==== Predation ====
Until the chicks reach a weight of roughly 65 g (2.3 oz), they are vulnerable to predation by gulls; at this point, they are too large for the gulls to carry. Development to this weight takes 10.5 days; since the parents protect their nest for the first 7 days, chicks spend 3.5 days more vulnerable to predation. To defend against this, parents camouflage the nest by removing eggshell remnants and defecating several meters away to avoid bright eye-catching material near the chicks. When aerial predators are present, chicks hide themselves among vegetation and debris.

On one occasion, a colony of black-naped terns were observed using mobbing, shrill cries, and defecation as defence mechanisms against an encroaching grey heron during the breeding season.

==== Fledging ====
Chicks fledge after 21–23 days; however, fledglings rely on their parents for at least 2 months afterwards. Parents and fledglings therefore leave breeding grounds together.

=== Calls ===
This tern calls with short, high-pitched, repeated sharp notes; "chit", "chip", "chrrut", "tsip".
