= Tin Kettle Island =

Island in Tasmania, Australia

Coordinates: 40°17′S 148°08′E

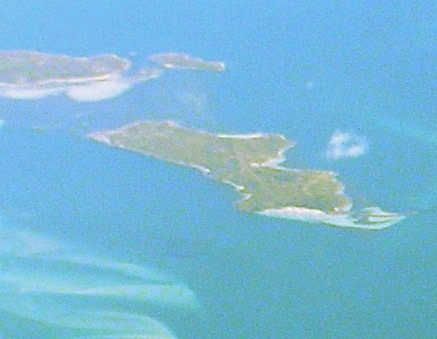
Tin Kettle Island aerial view

Tin Kettle Island is a long, sandy island, with an area of 176 ha, in south-eastern Australia. It is part of Tasmania’s Tin Kettle Island Group, lying in eastern Bass Strait between Flinders and Cape Barren Islands in the Furneaux Group. The island is joined at low tide to nearby Anderson and Little Andersons by extensive intertidal mudflats. The island is farmed, mainly cattle grazing. The island is part of the Franklin Sound Islands Important Bird Area, identified as such by BirdLife International because it holds over 1% of the world populations of six bird species.

== History ==
A small community of “sealers” was living on the island by the 1840s. Their numbers had multiplied by 1861 when guano surveyor John Thomas visited the island.

== Flora and fauna ==
The original vegetation has mostly been replaced by introduced pasture grasses.

Recorded breeding seabird and wader species are little penguin, Pacific gull, sooty oystercatcher and pied oystercatcher. The intertidal areas support large numbers of migratory waders. The metallic skink is present.

== See also ==
- List of islands of Tasmania
