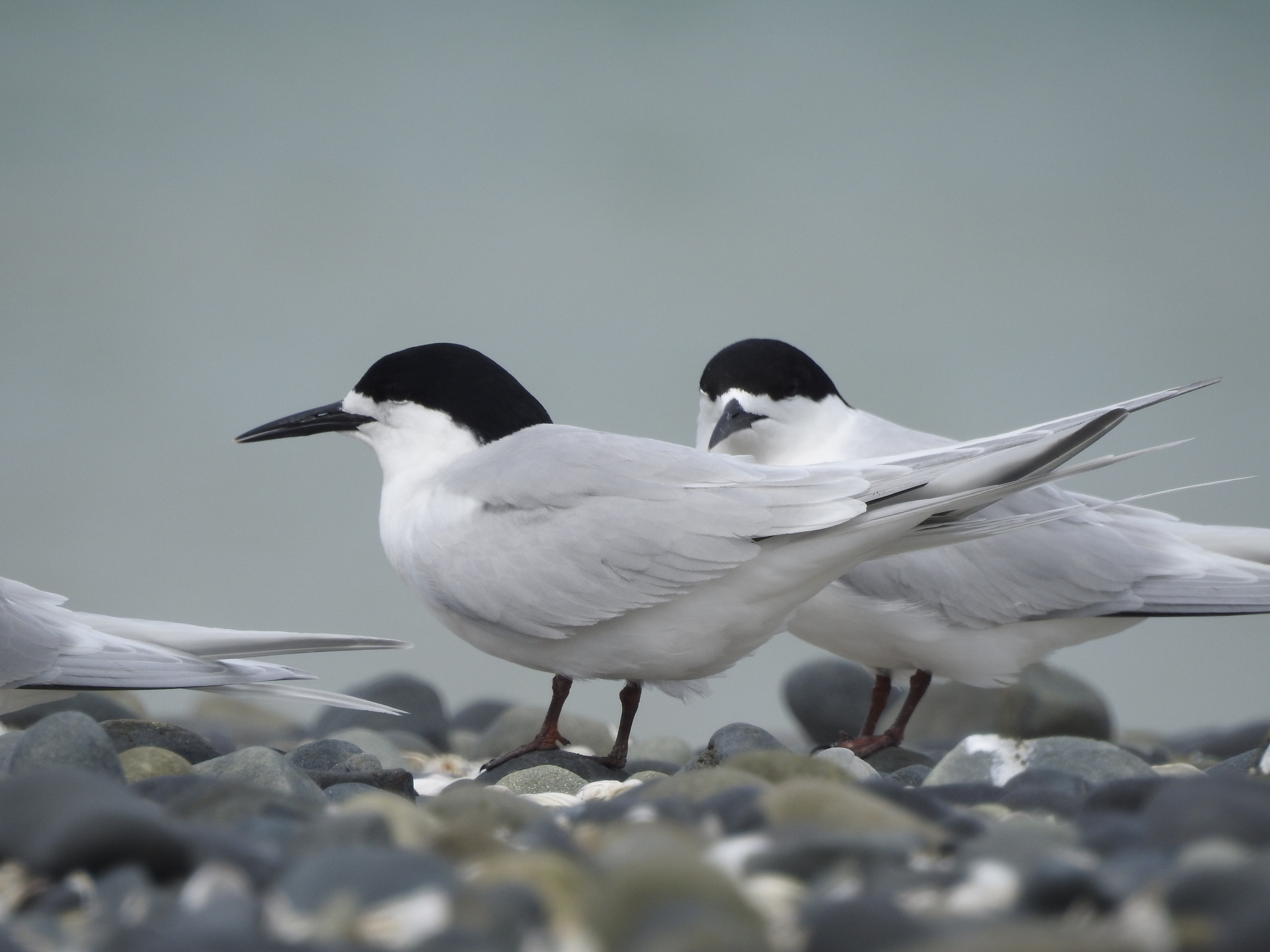
- Sterna striata at Kaiaua, Firth Of Thames, Waikato, New Zealand

Conservation status
- Near Threatened (IUCN 3.1)

Scientific classification
- Kingdom: Animalia
- Phylum: Chordata
- Class: Aves
- Order: Charadriiformes
- Family: Laridae
- Genus: Sterna
- Species: S. striata

Binomial name
- Sterna striata Gmelin, JF, 1789
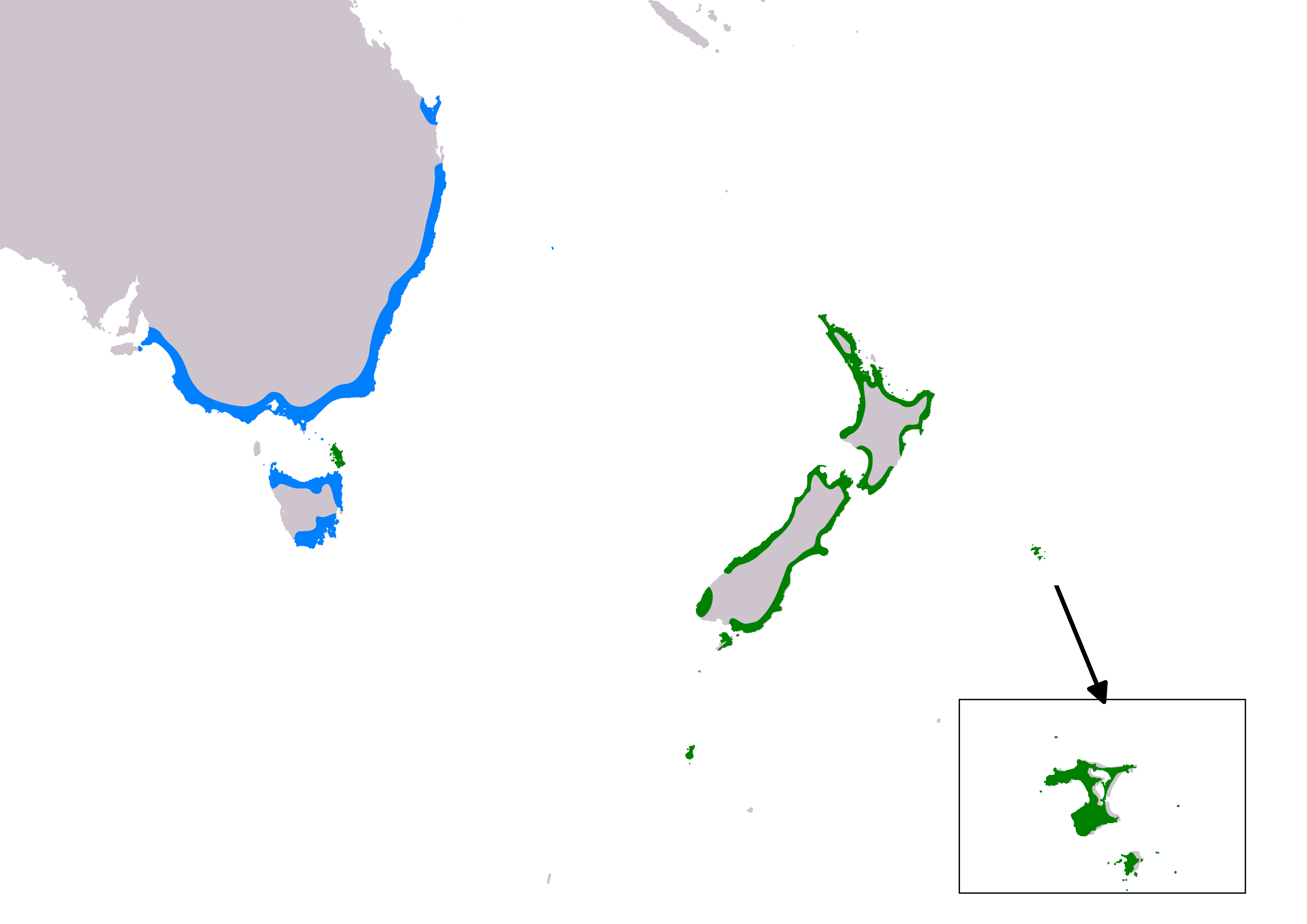
- Range of S. striata Resident Non-breeding

= White-fronted tern =

Species of bird

The white-fronted tern (Sterna striata), also known as tara, sea swallow, black-billed tern, kahawai bird, southern tern, or swallow tail, was first described by Johann Friedrich Gmelin in 1789. A medium-sized tern with an all-white body including underwing and forked tail, with pale grey hues on the mantle and upper side of the wing. In breeding adults a striking black cap covers the head from forehead to nape, leaving a small white strip above the black bill.

This is the most abundant tern in New Zealand. It can be observed feeding on shoaling fish along the entire coastline and many of the smaller outlying islands. Breeding occurs from October to January on rocky cliffs, offshore islands and along the coast where pairs will nest on shingle, sand, shell or rock. Flocks may contain hundreds of breeding pairs that will nest in close proximity to one another. Large numbers of juveniles and some adults migrate to the south-east coast of Australia and parts of Tasmania in the autumn, with small numbers establishing breeding colonies on Flinders and Cape Barren Islands in the Bass Strait.

Due to mammalian predators introduced to New Zealand, such as ferrets and stoats, the white-fronted tern has recently been given the New Zealand national conservation status of at risk/in decline.

== Taxonomy ==
The white-fronted tern was formally described in 1789 by the German naturalist Johann Friedrich Gmelin in his revised and expanded edition of Carl Linnaeus's Systema Naturae. He placed it with the terns in the genus Sterna and coined the binomial name Sterna striata. Gmelin based his description on the "striated tern" that had been described and illustrated in 1785 by the English ornithologist John Latham in his book A General Synopsis of Birds. The naturalist Joseph Banks had provided Latham with a drawing of the tern from New Zealand. The drawing had been made by William Wade Ellis from a specimen collected in 1777 off the southeast coast of New Zealand's North Island on James Cook's third voyage to the Pacific Ocean. The genus name Sterna comes from the Old English word for a black tern. The specific epithet is from Latin striatus meaning "striated". The species is monotypic: no subspecies are recognised.

The species is most closely related to roseate tern (S. dougallii) and black-naped tern (S. sumatrana), and slightly less closely related to common tern (S. hirundo), South American tern (S. hirundinacea), Antarctic tern (S. vittata) and Arctic tern (S. paradisaea).

== Description ==
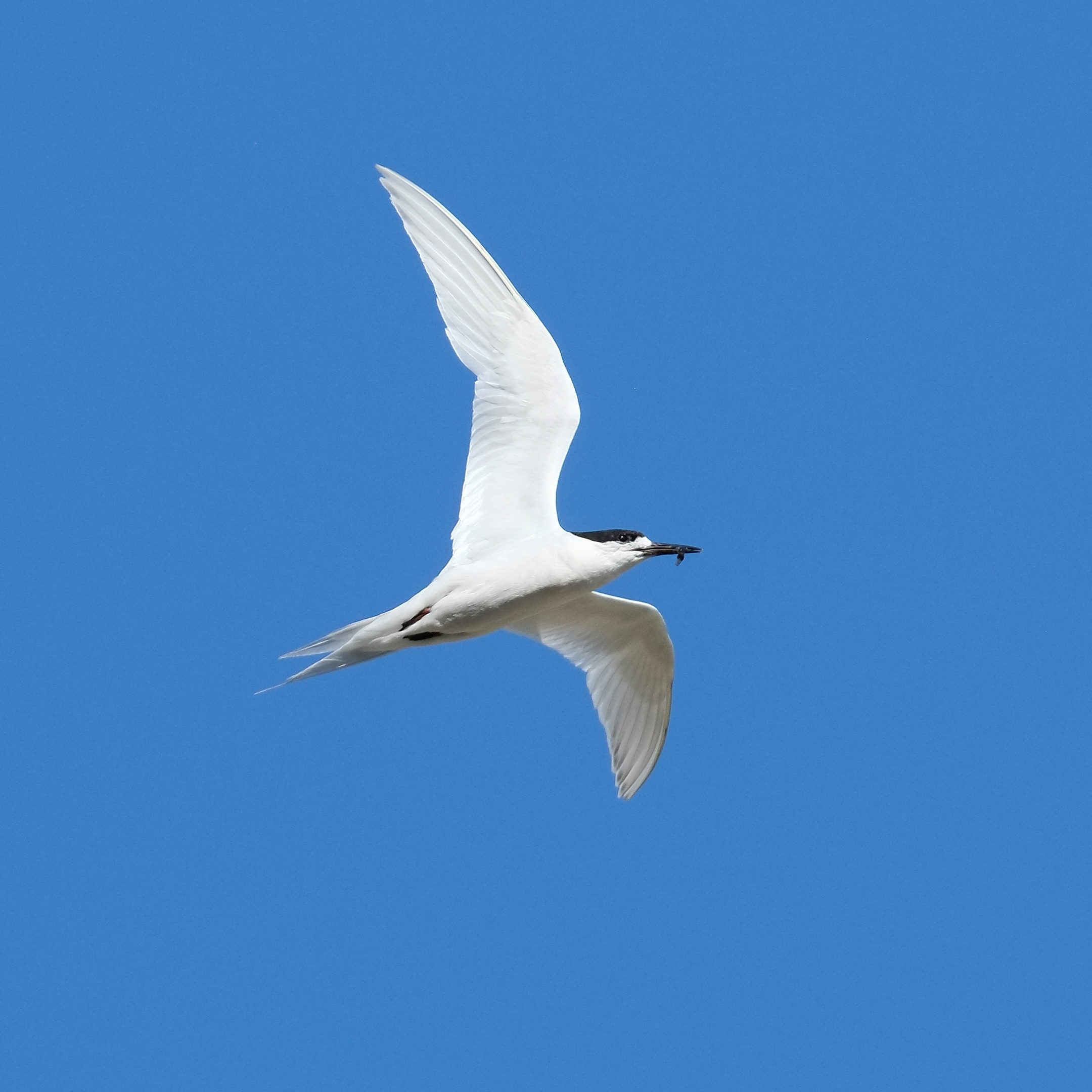
Sterna striata in flight with tiny fish in its beak

The white-fronted tern is an average-sized tern; its dimensions are 35–43 cm (14–17 in) in length, with a wingspan between 79 and 82 cm (31 and 32 in); the male weighs on average 130 g (4.6 oz). Females are marginally smaller than males, but this is difficult to determine when observing individuals in the wild.

Breaking down their monochromatic colouring, the white-fronted tern's lightest features are its all-white body, tail and underwing, with the upper side of the wings a light silvery-grey hue. Through the breeding season there can be a faint pink coloration on the breast, but this is not always visible. The darkest features are the beak, black cap, eyes, feet and the shadowing on the outermost edge of the wingtips. The long ebony-like bill is slender and comes to a sharp point that dulls in colour at the tip. The crown is jet black, interrupted by a variably narrow white band between forehead and bill. The black cap continues over the crown and finishes at the nape. Inky black round eyes sit within the cap. The legs are stumpy with a deep burgundy black tone. A defining feature of the white-fronted tern is its forked tail, most recognisable when in flight and commonly drawing comparisons with a swallow's tail. In the breeding season, the outermost feathers of the tail lengthen, accentuating the already deep fork.

The black cap of non-breeding adults retreats towards the top of the forehead and above the eyes, and at the same time losing some of its intensity. Immature white-fronted terns are similar but have speckles of white through the cap. Along with a slight coloration on the wings and tail, which appear as a brownish cream. The juvenile plumage is very pronounced with flecks of light to dark grey and warm milky browns on the upper side of the wing, back, and mantle. The cap is incomplete and mottled, having dark black markings in front of and behind the eyes.

=== Voice ===
A very dull crek is used in courtship when the male is flying above groups, individuals may respond with the same noise. When descending upon intruders, they will let out a continuous keark. Generally calling between individuals is a high-pitched siet used frequently during flight, it will be repeated over and over in particular intervals.

== Distribution and habitat ==
White-fronted terns are found in New Zealand and Australia. Juveniles will occasionally migrate across to south-east Australia and northern Tasmania. Breeding populations in Australia are only observed in the Bass Strait, on Flinders and Cape Barren Islands.

It is the most abundant tern in New Zealand, and lives along the entire coastline. In the North Island, there are significant populations from Auckland to the Bay of Plenty including the Coromandel Peninsula and they are widespread along the coast from Wellington, up towards Manawatu. In the South Island, they are a familiar sight in the Marlborough Sounds and along the east coast into Canterbury, Otago and Southland, where they can be seen year-round. Stewart Island also has flocks and breeding pairs throughout the year. Apart from the main coastline of New Zealand they also populate many of the smaller islands, with large numbers of breeding pairs observed on both the Chatham and the Auckland Islands. They seldom head inland, but there have been recordings of them in the Canterbury area, where they travel up the large braided rivers to feed and nest.

=== Habitat preferences ===
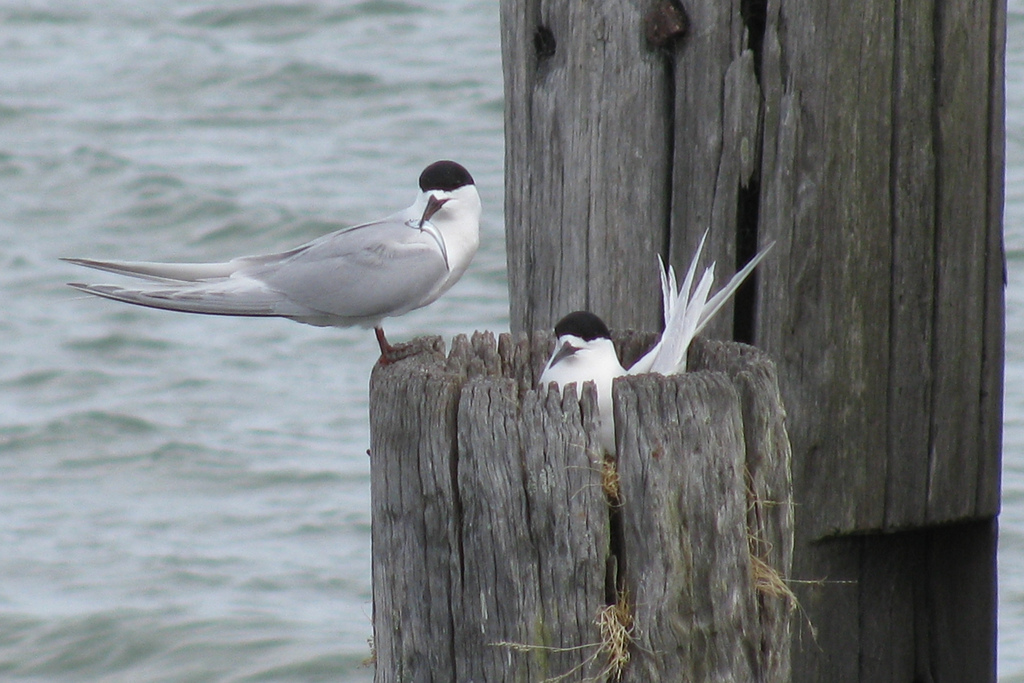
Adult pair nesting on old pier

White-fronted terns can be found in a variety of coastal habitats. With large flocks preferring coastal waters, harbours, bays and estuaries where they are content to live on either sand, shell or shingle ground. Occasionally living on the stony banks of Canterbury's braided rivers. Not confined to just main coastal areas, white-fronted terns frequent coastal cliffs, offshore rock-stacks and small islands. White-fronted terns can also be found on human-made structures like Tauranga Harbour, where breeding pairs have taken up residence on disused concrete support structures.

== Behaviour and ecology ==
White-fronted terns have a reputation for being difficult to monitor and study due to their unpredictable nature. It becomes very apparent in the breeding season, as white-fronted terns seldom return to the same breeding sites year after year, making it difficult for a clear indication of numbers and breeding results.

=== Breeding ===
Courtship begins in early October when the warmth of spring has arrived and can continue into January, with individuals constantly arriving at various breeding grounds. A male will fly in from sea with a fish delicately held in its bill; it will fly above groups of females and attempt to gain their attention by calling to them. The male may land and strut around with head and fish held high to attract more attention from potential mates and there may be a suggestive approach by female/s seeking to have the fish fed to them. But at this point, the male will swiftly take flight, closely followed by one or more of his potential mates. The spectacle continues until there remains only one follower. The pair will land together, the male may offer the fish to the female in acceptance of courtship, or he may disapprove of the female and retain the fish for himself. If accepted, the partnership begins. The pair takes to the air together following one another in a magnificent flight display, signifying successful courtship. White-fronted tern are monogamous, so will stay together for the entire breeding season.

Shortly after courtship, the pair will choose a spot for their nest. No real effort goes into nest-building, it can be directly onto bare ground or in a rocky area. The nest site may already have a nest-like shape to it, but sometimes small stones can be brought in to furnish the bottom of the hollow. Nests are tightly packed together, sometimes with less than a metre between them. In large breeding colonies there may be hundreds of nests. Laying in breeding colonies is synchronised, with large numbers of females laying on the same day. Some variations occur and are due to the age of the adults, with older birds laying earlier in the season. They will lay 1–2 eggs and on rare occasions, 3. The brown speckled eggs vary in their pale base colour, which can range from green, through blue to brown. The size of an egg is on average 46 × 33 mm. The clutch is cared for by both male and female, with an incubation period of approximately 24 days. Adults will continue to join the colony and lay eggs from October–January.

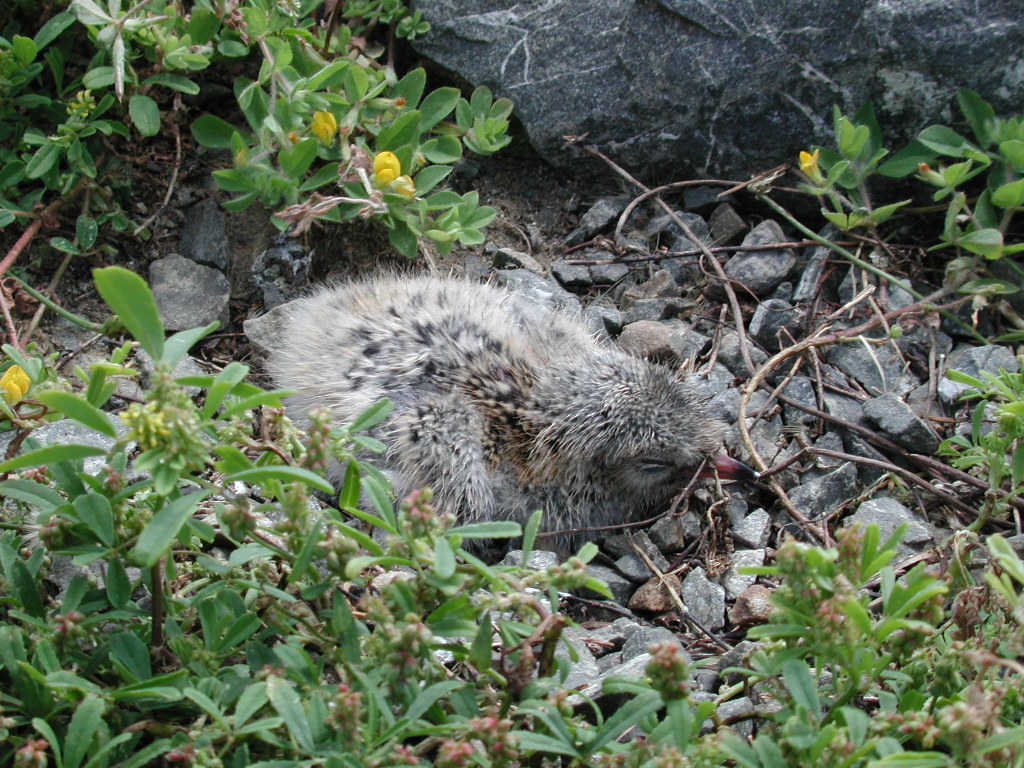
White-fronted tern chick hiding on the ground

The colour of the chicks is highly variable. They can be a combination of greys, browns, whites and blacks with a speckled and fluffy appearance. Chicks will remain in the nest and be brooded by both adults for several days. It can be up to a week before the chicks leave the nest and join others in a crèche; here they have protection due to the more substantial numbers, while adults are away foraging for food. When a chick is lost to a predator or natural event during the breeding season, more clutches will be laid. Adults are likely to only raise only one chick to fledging, even if two eggs have been laid. Adults will care for their chick for 29-35 days, at which point they become fledged. Through this time, there is substantial growth: wings and body develop to a similar size to those of the adults. The young gain the ability to fly during this time, and they will start to venture out with the adults away from the colony; still being fed by the adults for up to 3 months.

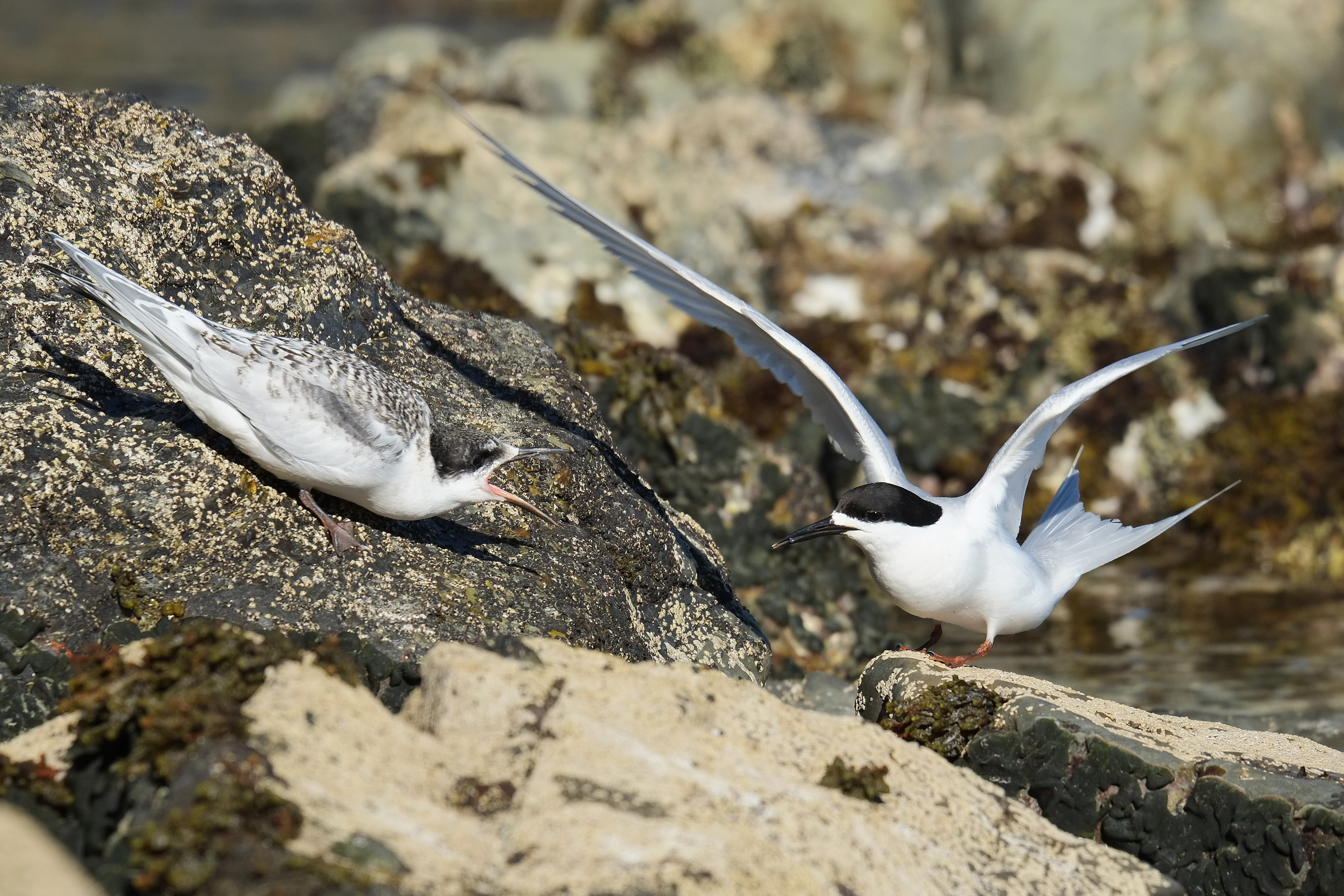
Juvenile white-fronted tern begging parent for food

After the fledgling phase, there is a partial moult where they gain some of their juvenile plumage. This occurs through March-April and continues till June-July. Most juveniles will stay with their flock along the New Zealand coastline with no migration. However, in autumn large numbers of juveniles and some adults migrate across the Tasman Sea, arriving on the south-east coast of Australia, where they become a common sight from May to November before returning to New Zealand. Over the next two years, there will be moulting phases alongside the breeding adults, first pre-breeding (May–August), first post-breeding (January–August) and second pre-breeding (May–August). They are slowly gaining adult plumage through each moult and by the second pre-breeding moult they appear similar to adults. After two years, they have matured enough to breed. However, it is a rare occurrence and is more common for adults to start breeding at 7 years old.

Adults can live beyond 18 years of age with a record of one reaching 26 years. Adults will moult twice a year, post-breeding which occurs over 6 months from January to early August and pre-breeding that starts around May/June, finishing in July/August. Pre-breeding moult is where the adult's black cap will extend further down the forehead, leaving only the small band of white across the top of its bill.

=== Food and feeding ===
White-fronted terns are carnivorous, fishing mainly in coastal waters. However, on the odd occasion they will head inland a few kilometres, following rivers and creeks to find food. Their diet is predominantly smaller fish such as smelt and pilchards while also including larval fish. Their preference when feeding at sea is for shoaling fish, that are being forced to the surface in large groups by kahawai and kingfish. When feeding, they will dive from 3 to 10 m above the surface into the shoal of fish, just entering the water in a very shallow dive. They can feed like this off the coast in huge flocks that are made up of hundreds to thousands of birds. They will feed alongside other birds such as gannets, shearwaters and gulls. When diving for fish, they are highly efficient. Their forked tails and adept flying skills allow for great movement above the water surface.

== Predators ==
As of 2016, the conservation status of white-fronted tern is at risk/in decline. Even with a large population, there is a predicted decline in the coming years. Numbers are falling due to predation by several introduced mammalian species. Adults are attacked and killed by cats, mustelids, ferrets and stoats. These same predators will also target the eggs and chicks, while rats and hedgehogs put further pressure on white-fronted tern by going for eggs and chicks exclusively. Despite living and breeding in groups with large numbers that are tightly packed together, it seldom offers them any extra protection from the intruding attackers.

Red-billed gulls and black-backed gulls are the only native species that will prey on white-fronted tern, though they only go for eggs and chicks. They often nest near the white-fronted tern, which may be a contributing factor for this behaviour. Skuas are also well known to attack them in the air as they return from the sea with fish. They will intimidate them while flying until they drop the fish and catch it before losing it to the sea.

== Conservation status ==
A recent audit published by the Department of Conservation has given S. striata a New Zealand national conservation status of "At risk, declining". It has also gained the regional conservation status of "Regionally Endangered" for the Wellington region.

== Gallery ==
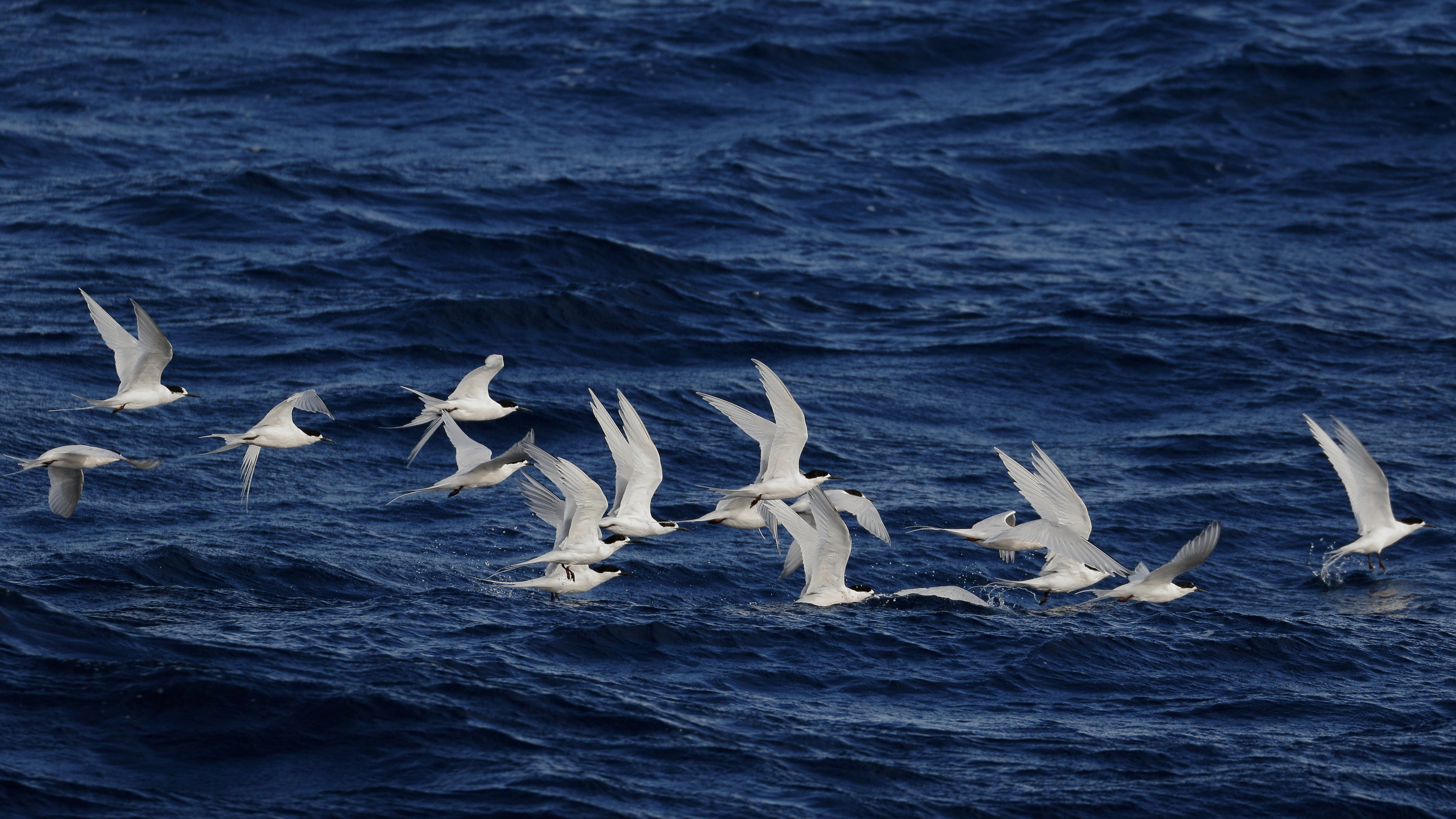
Flock of white-fronted terns foraging at sea

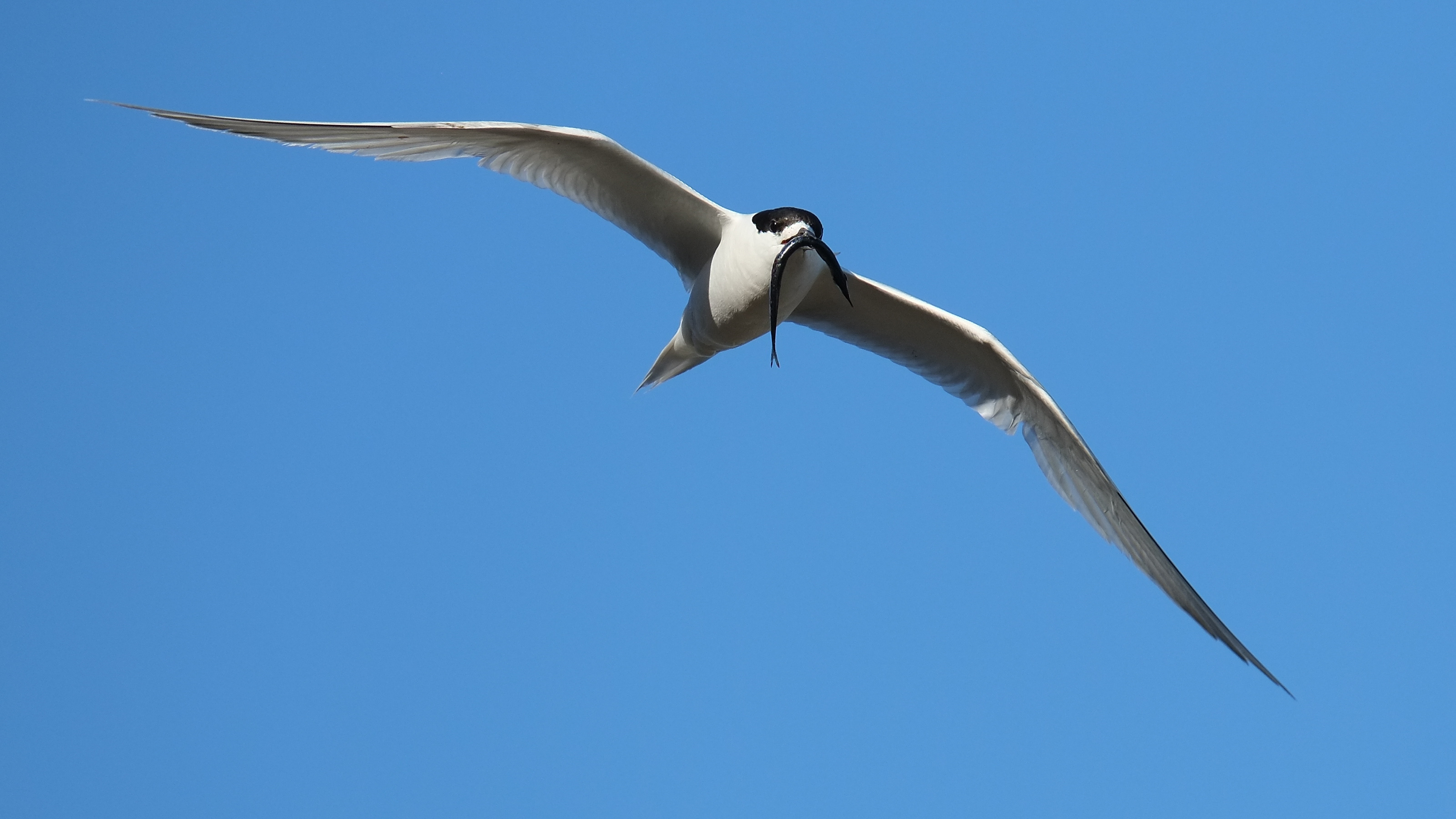
White-fronted tern flying with fish in its beak

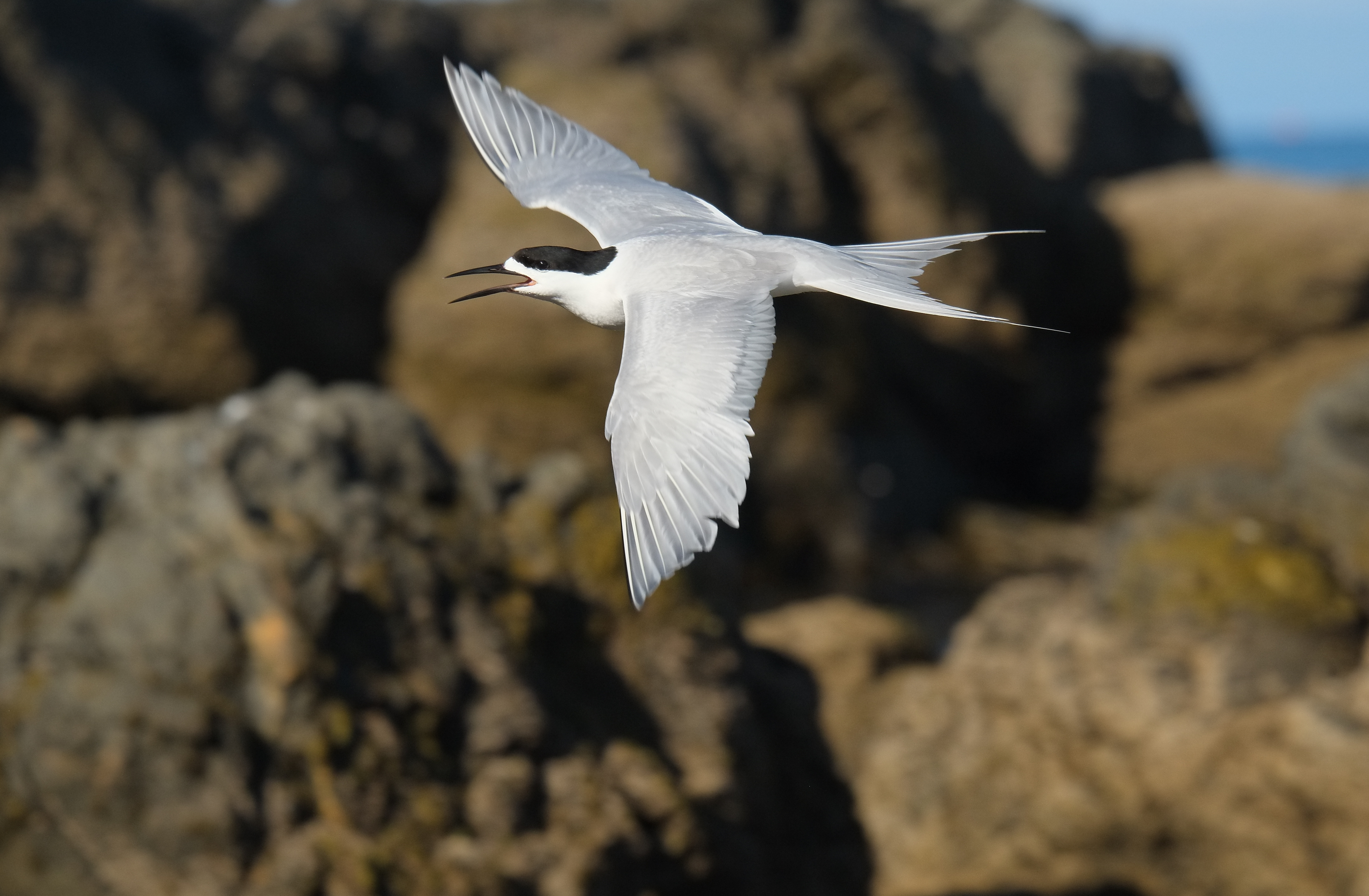
Adult in flight

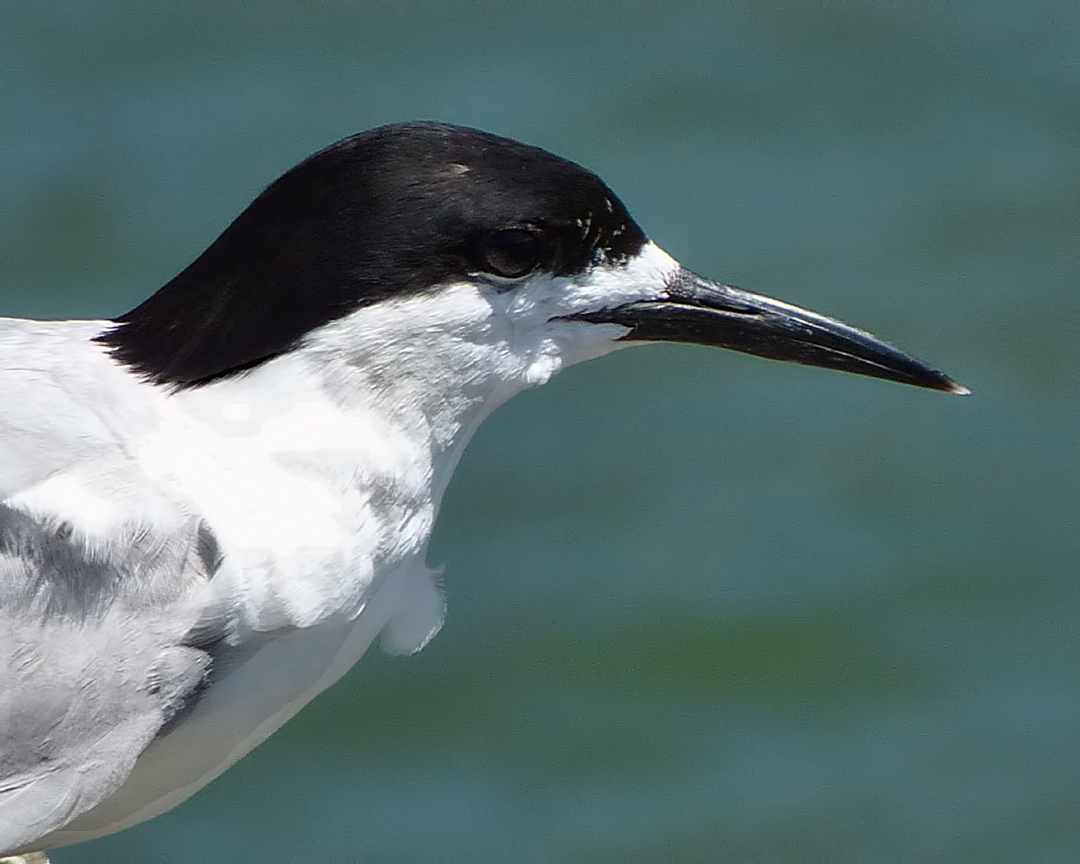
Breeding adult with black cap and white band across top of beak

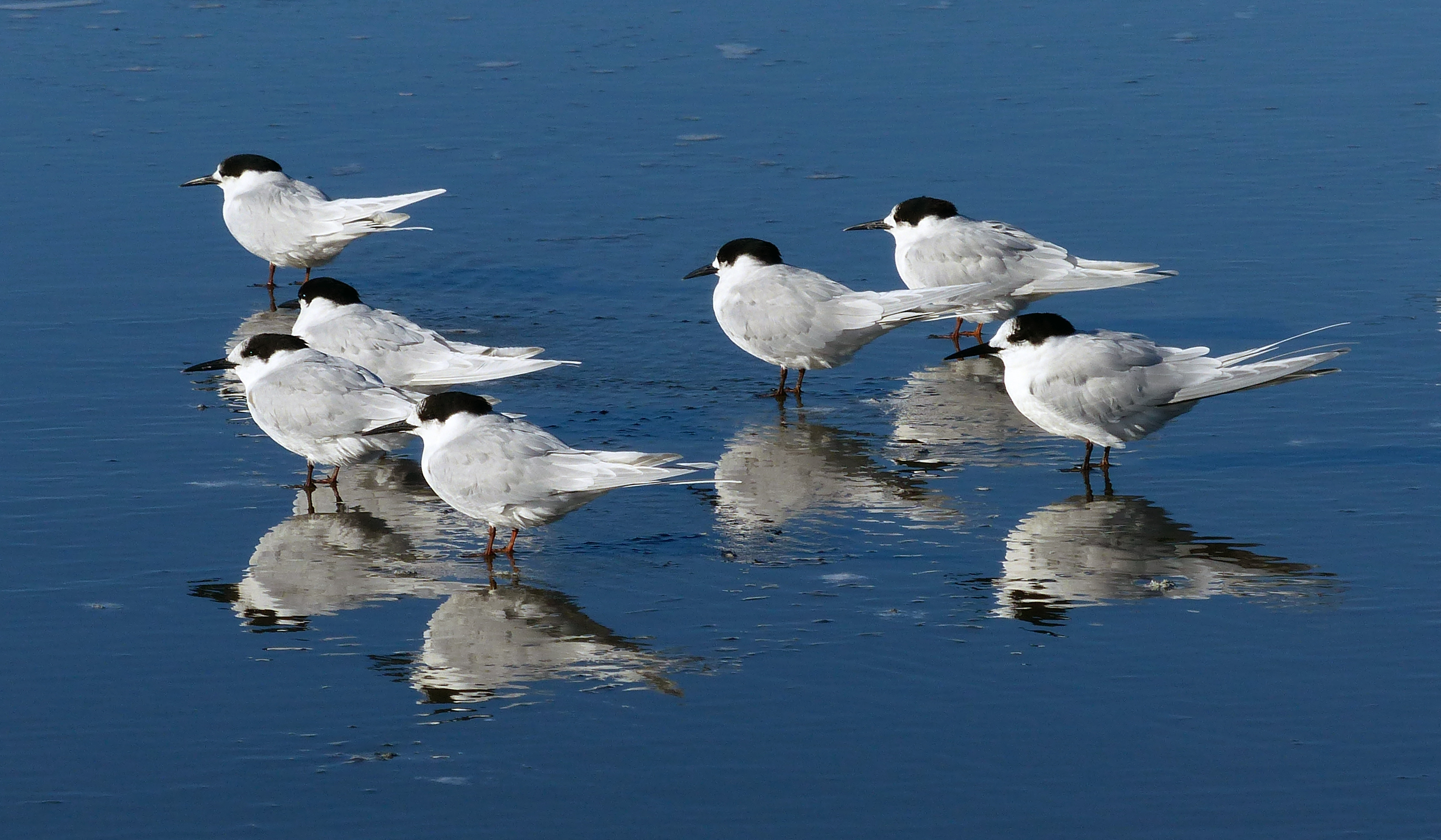
Group of white-fronted tern on beach

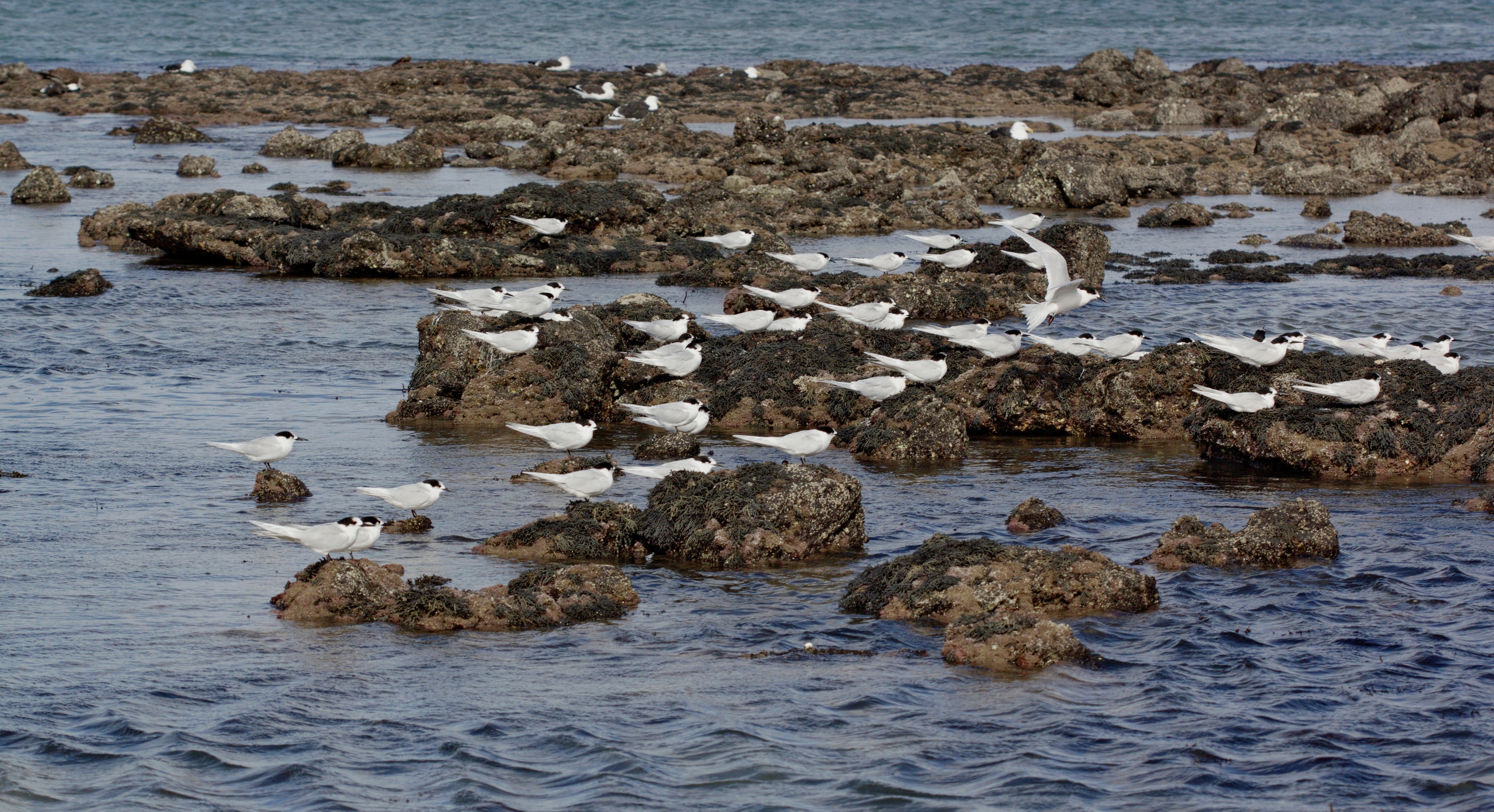
Small flock at rest

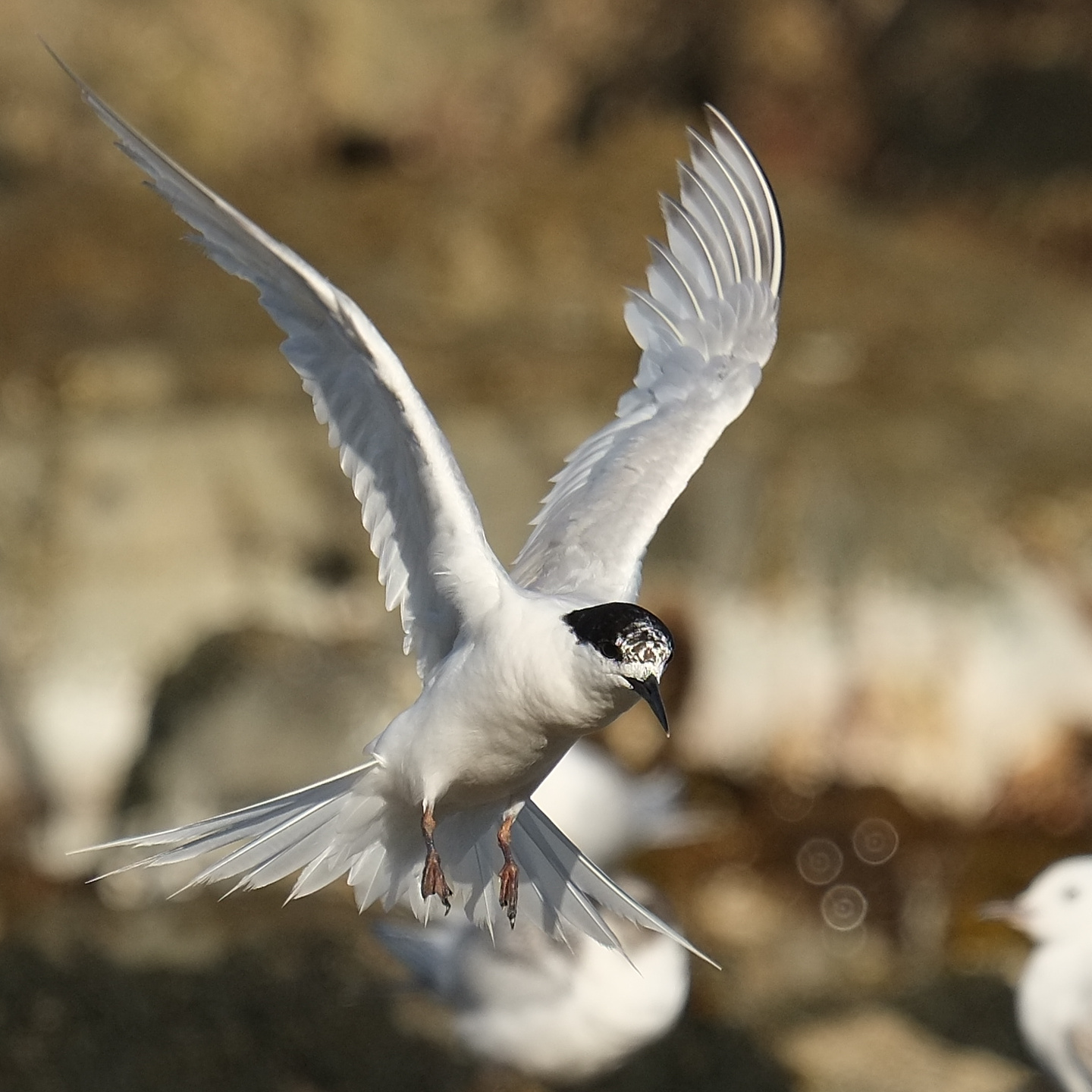
White-fronted tern flapping its wings as it lands

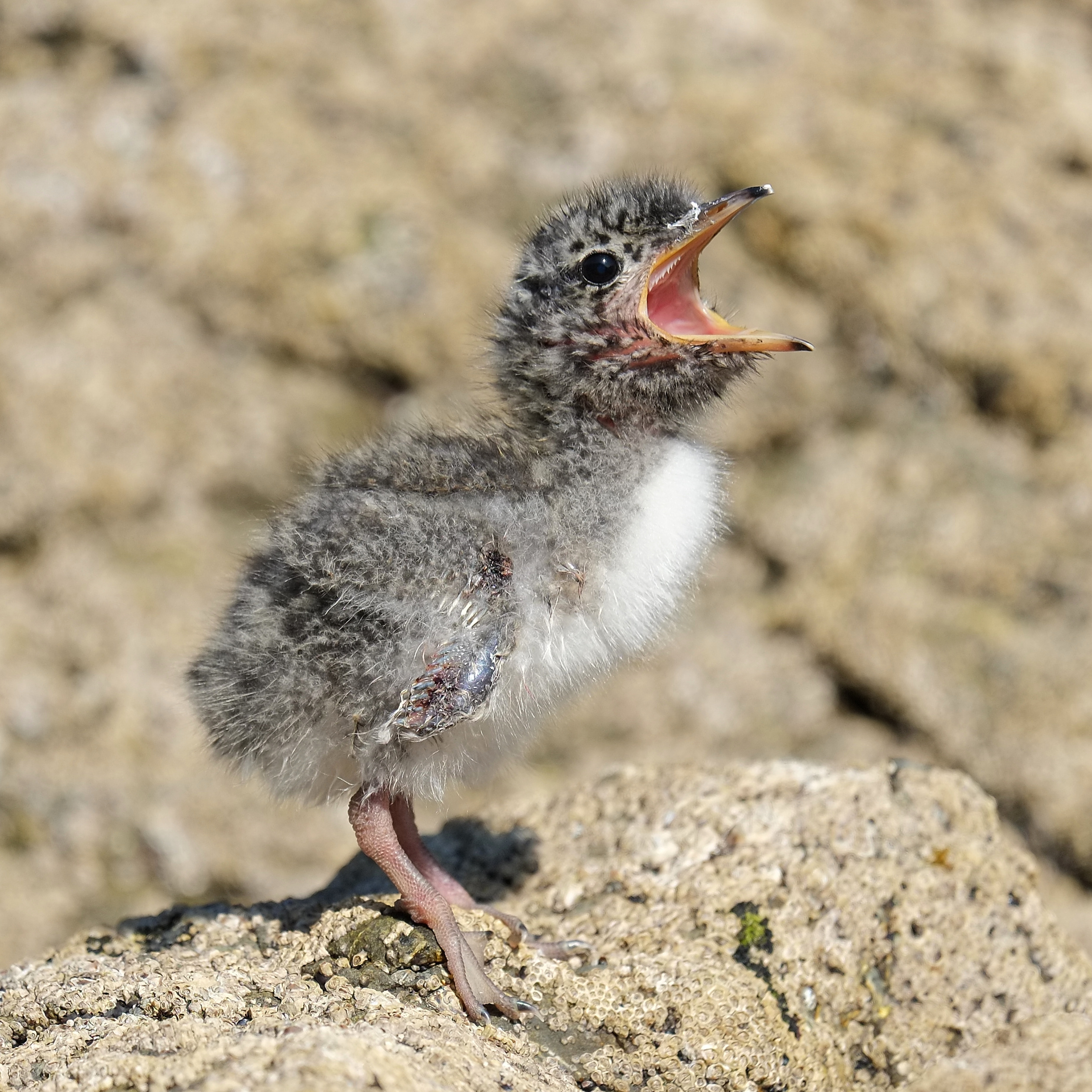
Young chick calling for parent

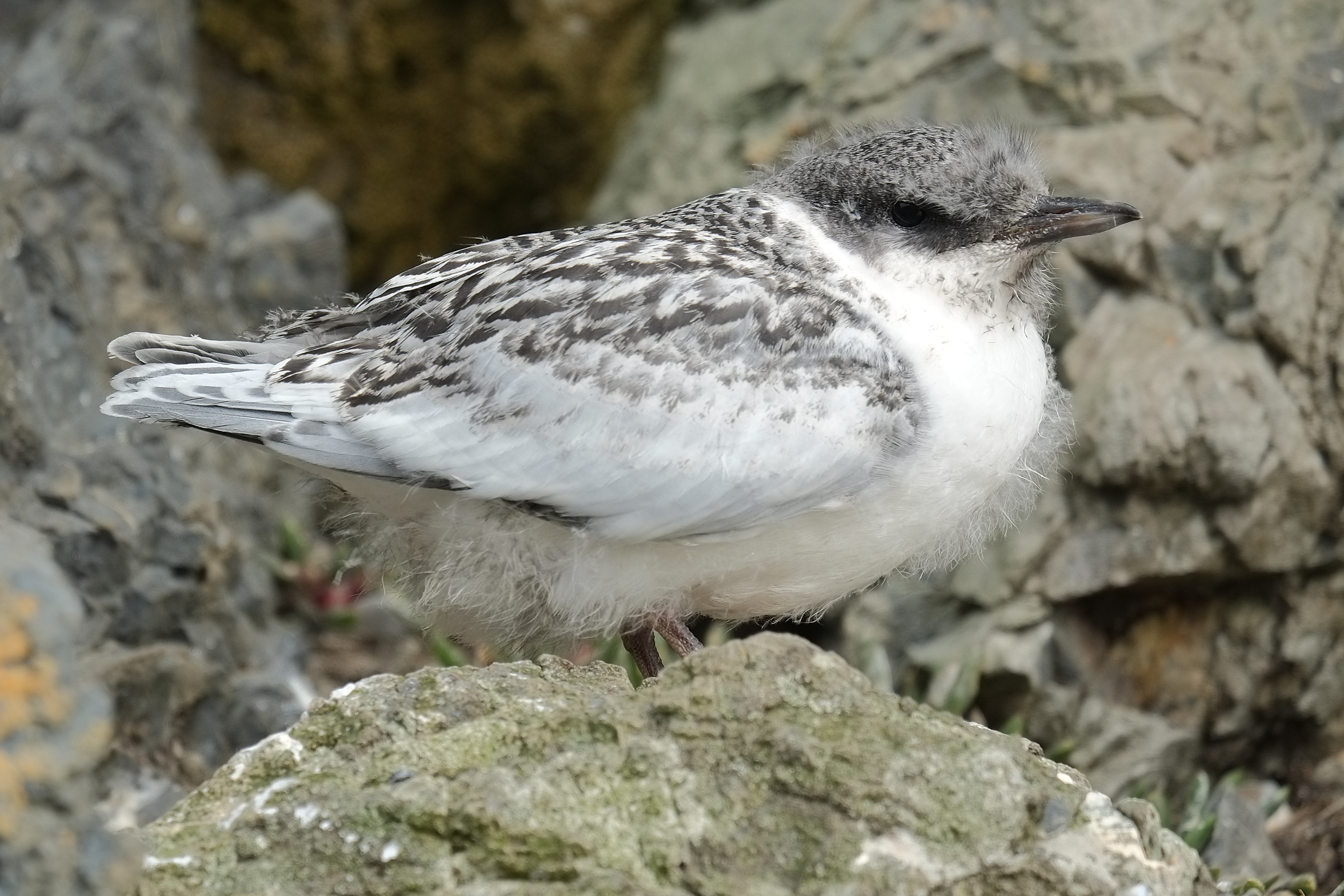
Juvenile
