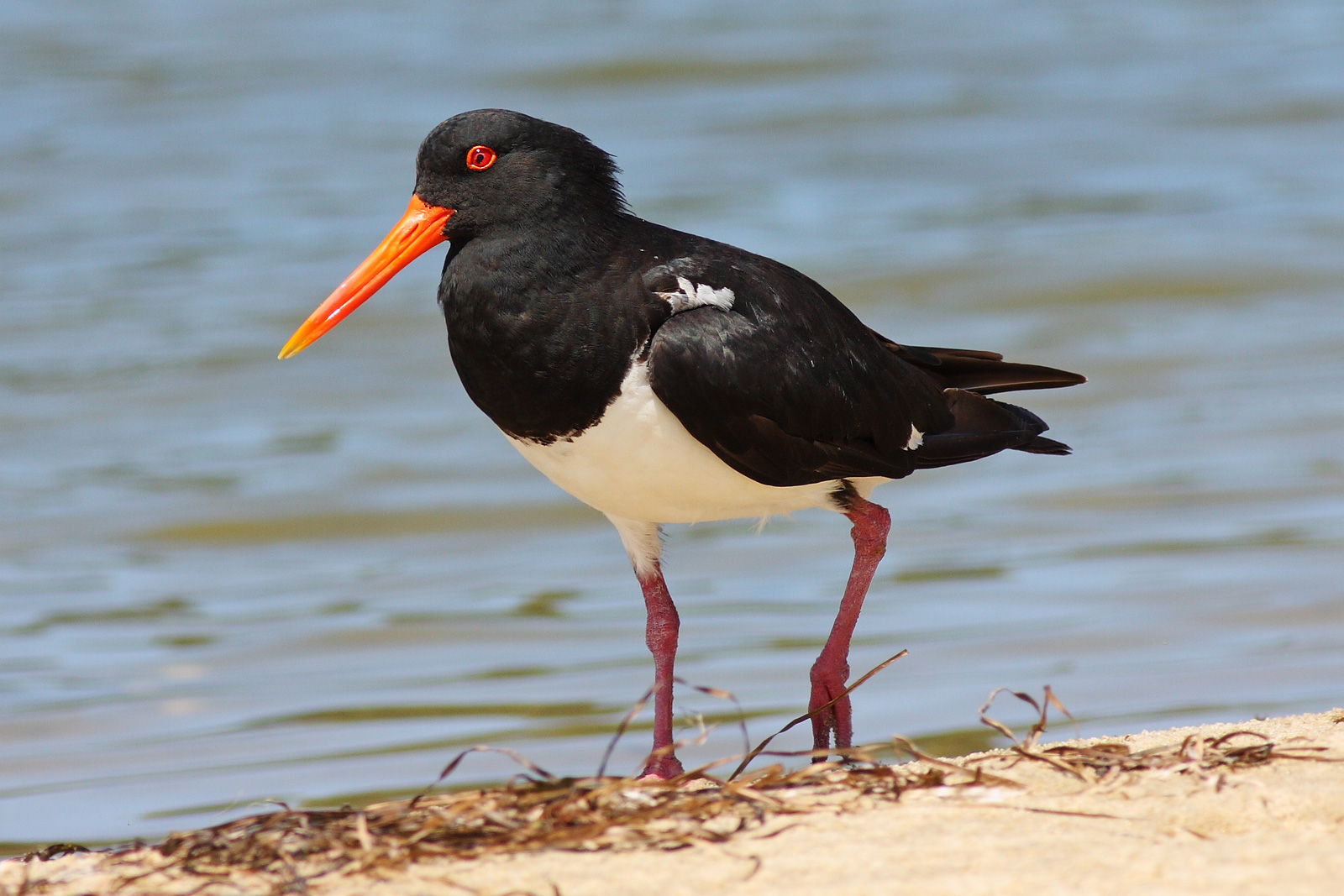
- An adult walking along a coastline in Victoria

Conservation status
- Least Concern (IUCN 3.1)

Scientific classification
- Kingdom: Animalia
- Phylum: Chordata
- Class: Aves
- Order: Charadriiformes
- Family: Haematopodidae
- Genus: Haematopus
- Species: H. longirostris

Binomial name
- Haematopus longirostris Vieillot, 1817
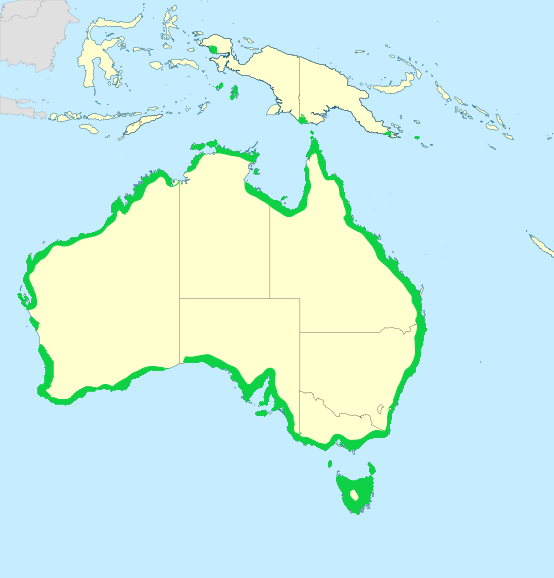
- Distribution within Australasia (green)

= Pied oystercatcher =

Species of bird

The pied oystercatcher (Haematopus longirostris) is a species of oystercatcher. It is a wading bird native to Australia and commonly found on its coastline. The similar South Island pied oystercatcher (H. finschi) occurs in New Zealand.

== Description ==
The name "oystercatcher" is something of a misnomer for this species, because they seldom eat oysters, which are found mainly on rocky coastlines. Pied oystercatchers frequent sandy coastlines, where they feed mainly on bivalve molluscs, which are prised apart with their specially adapted bill. These adaptations allow the Pied oystercatchers to slip their bills between the ventral edges of these shelled organisms, further allowing them to sever the shells and reach the edible flesh inside.

This Australian species is easily recognized by the characteristic 5–8 cm long orange-red beak, slender pink legs and black and white plumage. With the wings extended, a white wing-stripe is also visible. The male and female show little differentiation, except that the males generally sport a shorter, wider beak.

== Habits ==
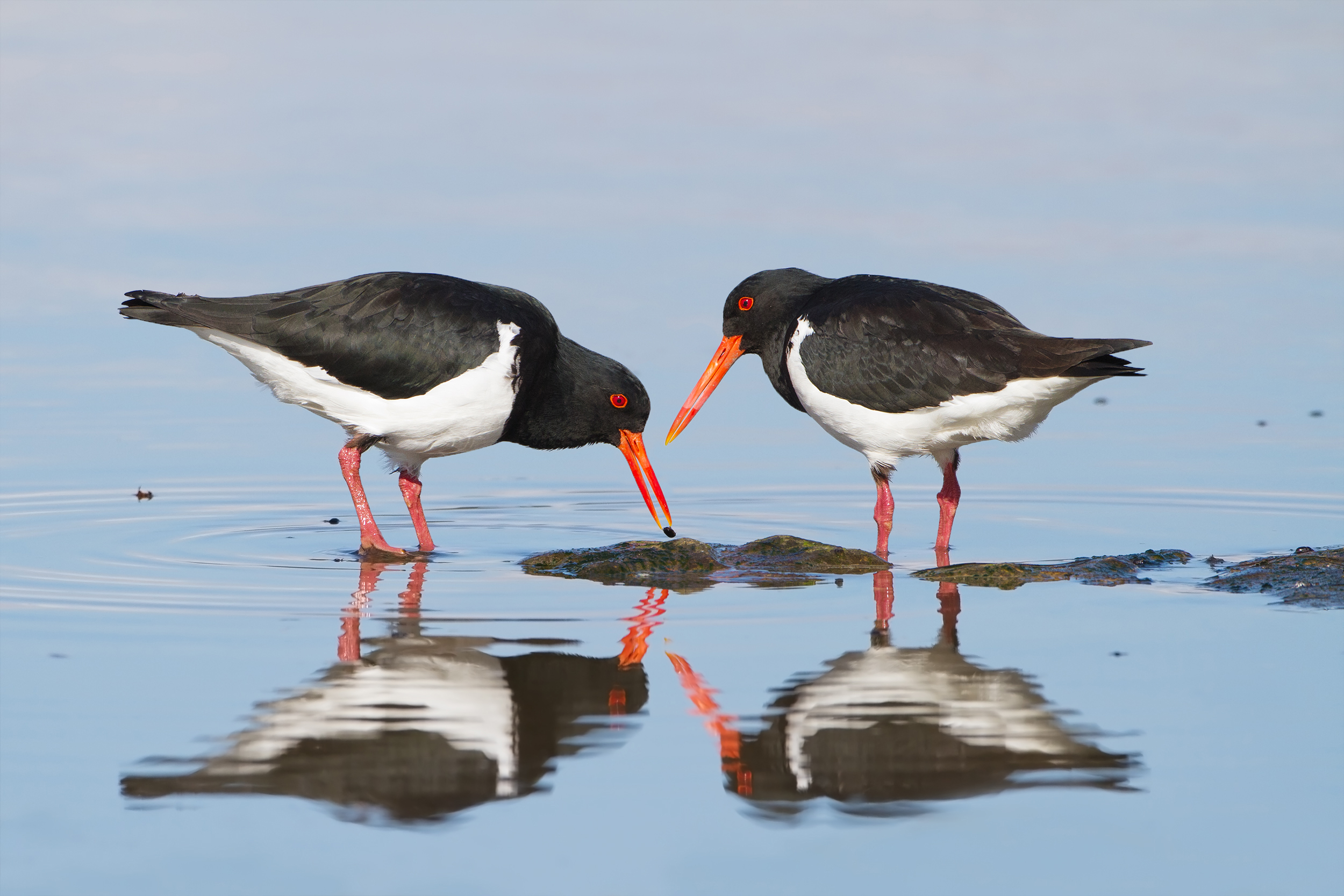
A pair of adult pied oystercatchers in Tasmania, Australia. The one on the left is flicking a small mussel into its mouth.

Pied oystercatchers are most commonly observed to feed in pairs, or small flocks, concentrating hunting efforts on a single area along shorelines of rocky beaches. Pied oystercatchers feed mainly on bivalve molluscs, such as Paphies elongata and Mactra rufescens, but also take other invertebrates. The techniques they use to break open the shells of the molluscs vary greatly and are thought to be learned behavior.

They nest in shallow scrapes made in open areas near the shore and produce 2–3 eggs in a typical clutch. Each couple protects its nesting area and often uses the same area year after year. Like the gulls they share the shore with, oystercatchers will band together to mob a perceived threat.

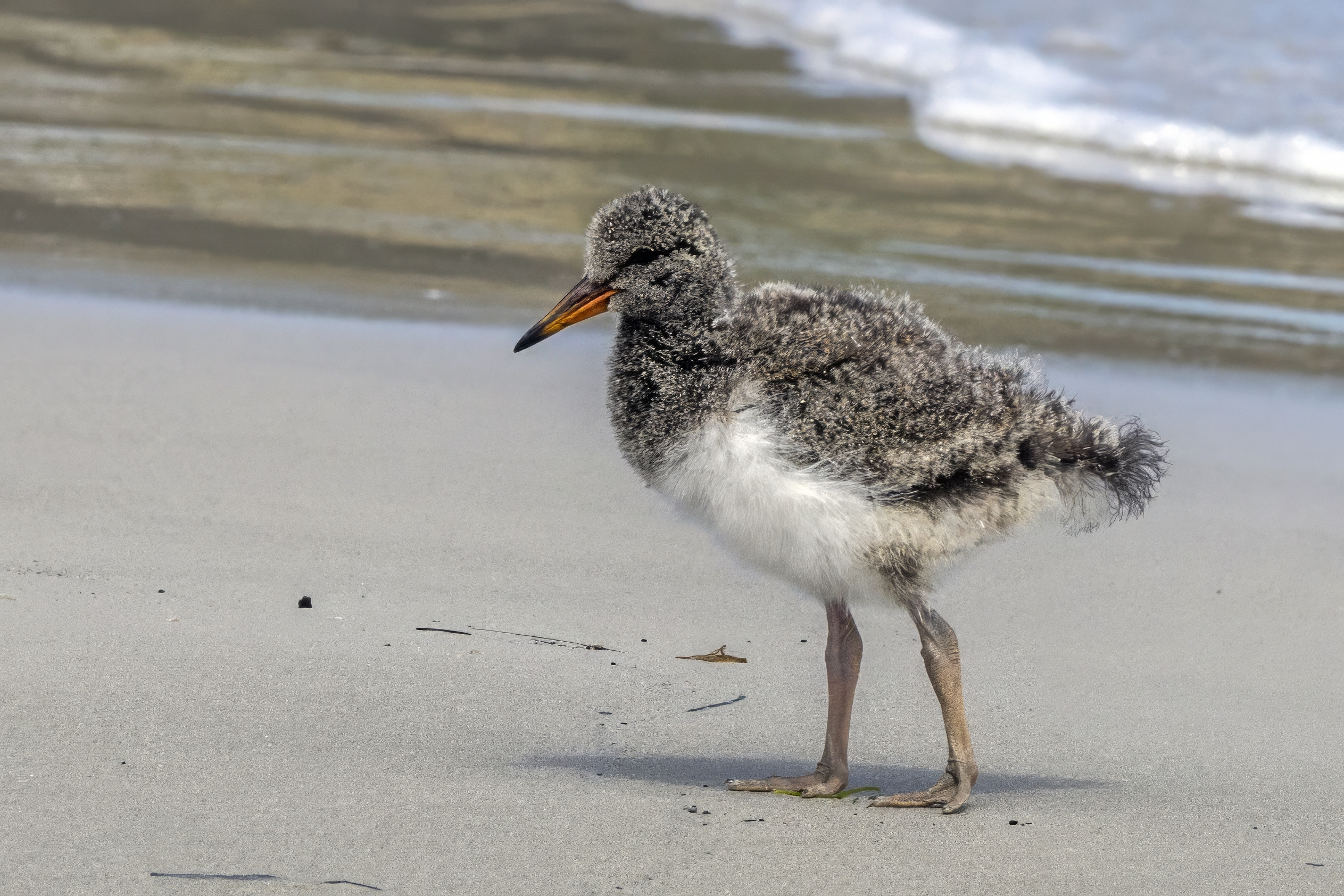
juvenile

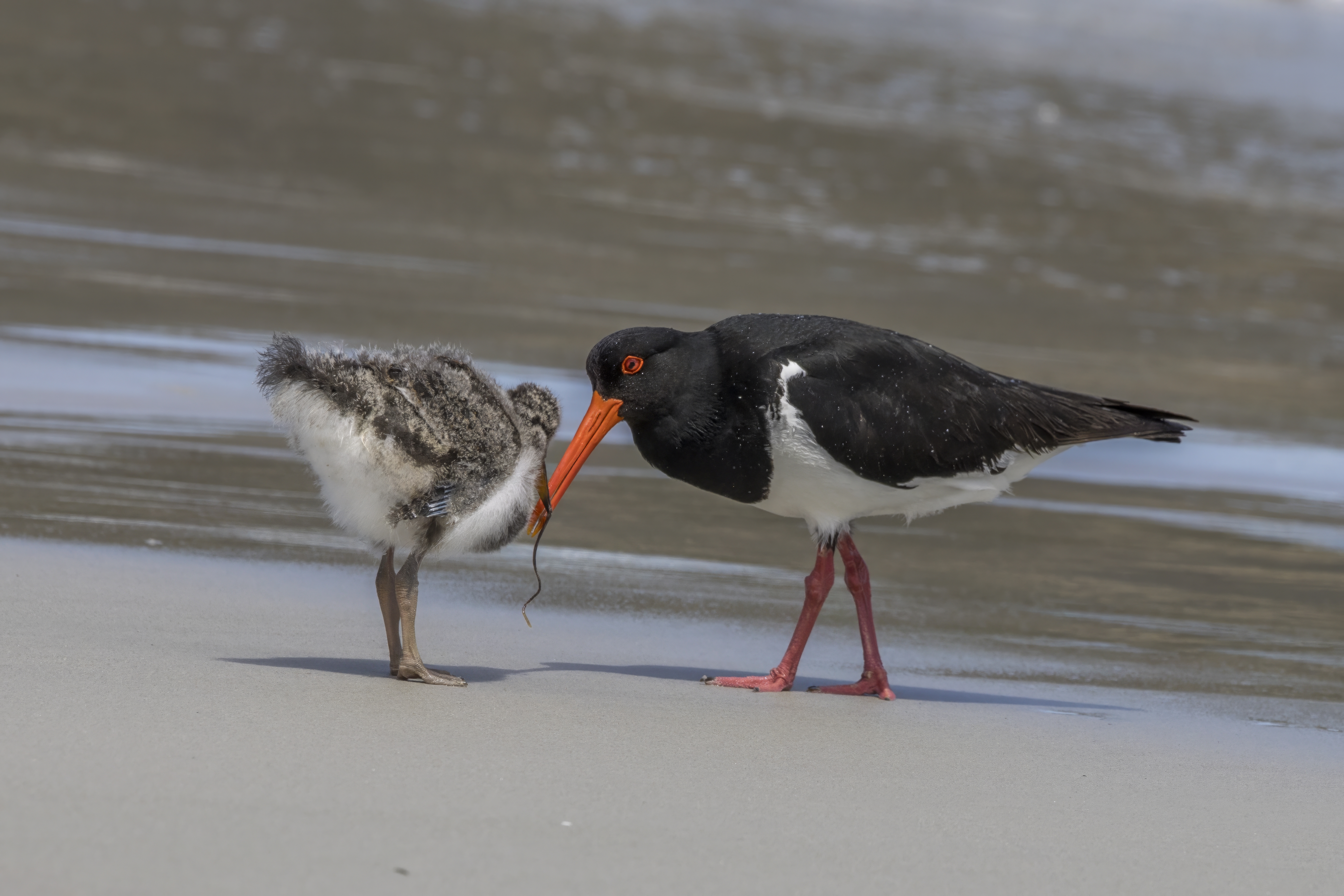
adult feeding juvenile

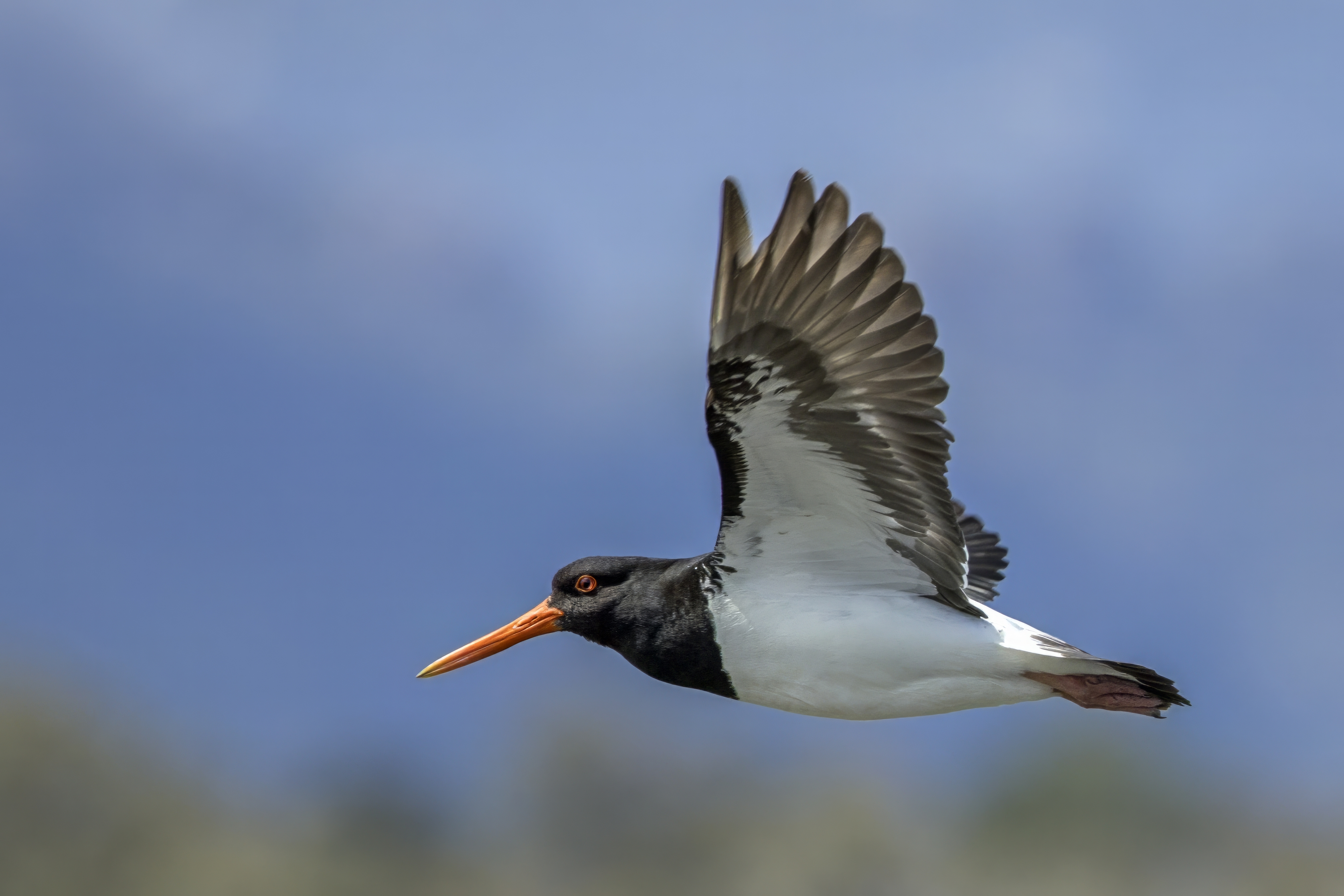

== Conservation status ==
The pied oystercatcher is considered federally to be secure and in New South Wales, Australia, is listed as endangered.
