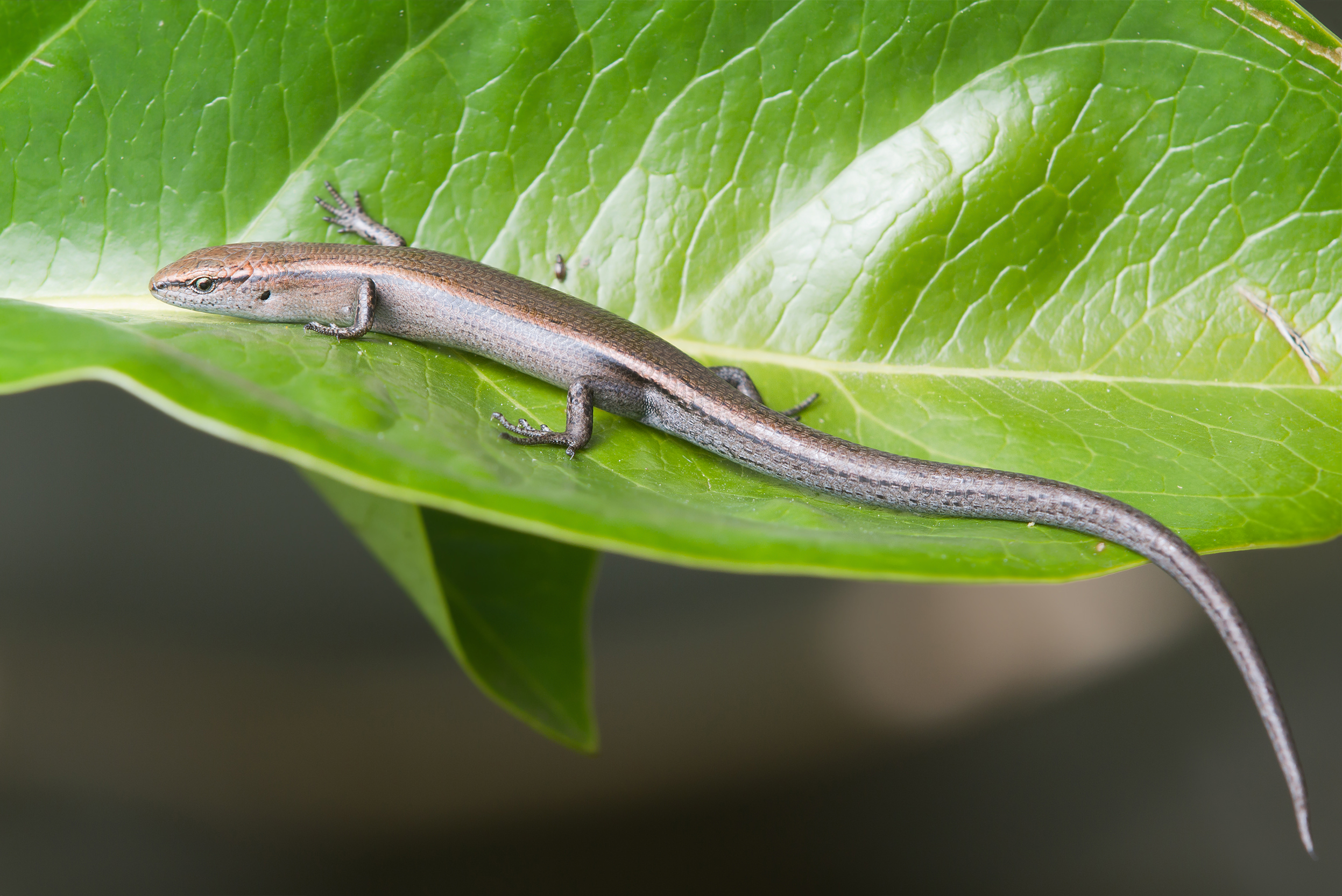
- At Austins Ferry, Tasmania, Australia

Conservation status
- Least Concern (IUCN 3.1)

Scientific classification
- Kingdom: Animalia
- Phylum: Chordata
- Class: Reptilia
- Order: Squamata
- Family: Scincidae
- Genus: Carinascincus
- Species: C. metallicus

Binomial name
- Carinascincus metallicus (O'Shaughnessy, 1874)

Synonyms
- Niveoscincus metallicus (O'Shaughnessy, 1874); Leiolopisma metallica (O'Shaughnessy, 1874); Mocoa metallica O'Shaughnessy, 1874

= Metallic skink =

Species of lizard

"Metallic skink" may also refer to the garden skink (Lampropholis delicata).

Carinascincus metallicus, the metallic cool-skink or metallic skink is a species of skink in the family Scincidae. It is endemic to Australia, found in southern Victoria, as well as in Tasmania where it is the most widespread and common lizard, occurring on many offshore islands in Bass Strait as well as the mainland. It gives birth to live young. It is highly variable in colour and pattern, and may be a complex of closely related species.

== Description and Identification ==
The Metallic Skink exhibits a range of colour variations depending on its habitat. It is typically brown with pale or dark streaks, sometimes forming distinct longitudinal stripes along its body. The dorsal scales have a metallic sheen, which gives the species its name. The underside is usually grey or white with dark spots on the throat, chest, and tail, while the belly and lower tail often have an orange or pink hue.

This species has 24–28 rows of keeled (ridged) scales at mid-body. It has dark eyes, a movable lower eyelid with a transparent disc, and an ear opening of similar size. Adult skinks can grow up to 63 mm in length.

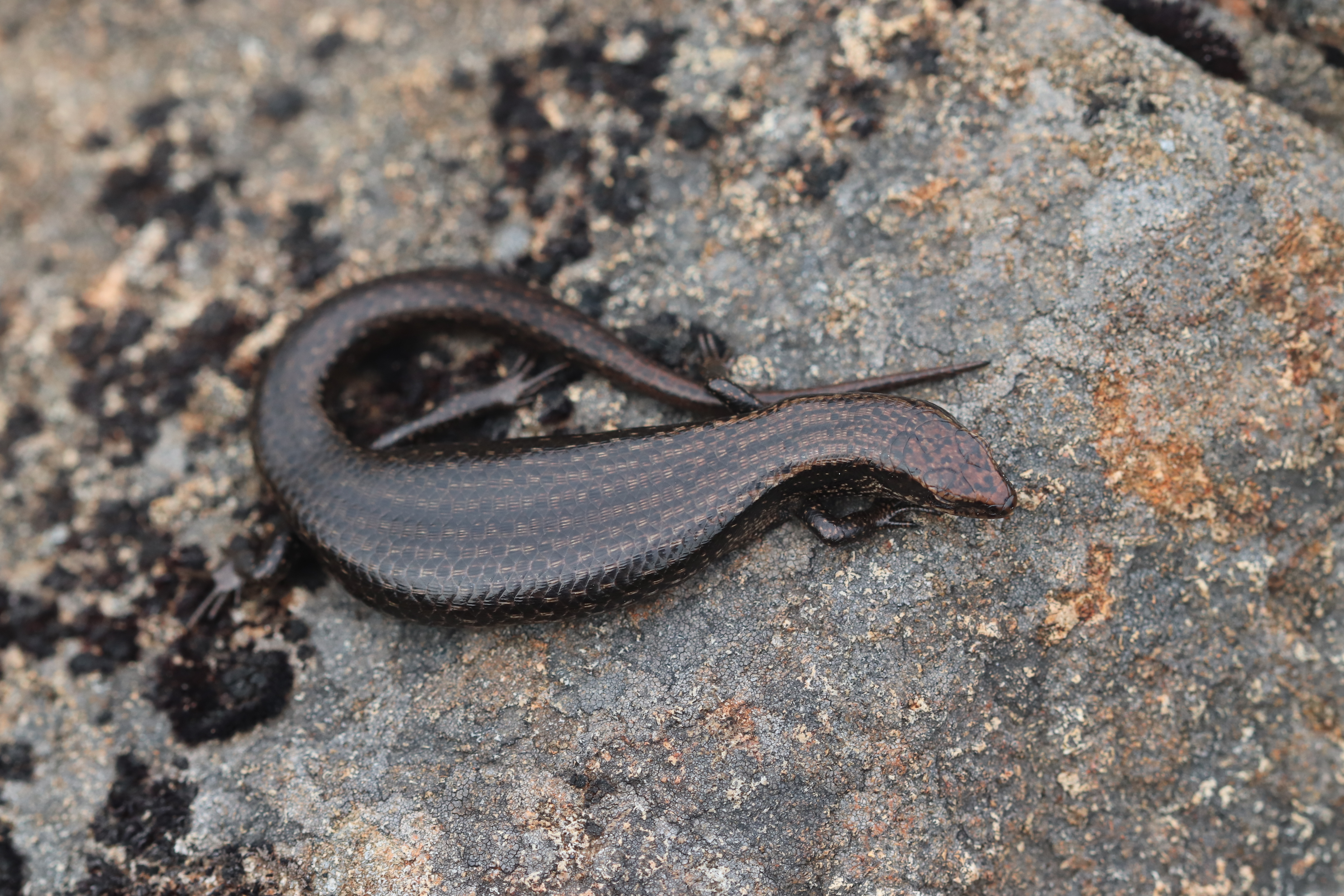
A pregnant Metallic Skink basks on a rock along the Tarn Shelf Track, Tasmania.

== Habitat and Distribution ==
The Metallic Skink is primarily found in Tasmania, with a more recent expansion into southern Victoria. It occupies a wide range of habitats, including coastal dunes, heathlands, dry and wet sclerophyll forests, and woodlands. However, it is most common in cool-temperate zones.

As a diurnal heliotherm, C. metallicus relies on external heat sources, such as sunlight, to regulate its body temperature. It is primarily ground-dwelling but often climbs rocks and fallen logs to bask. During inactive periods, it shelters beneath rocks or in decomposing logs.

The species occurs across a significant elevation range, from sea level up to 1500 metres, which coincides with the subalpine tree line. At higher altitudes, colder conditions shorten the active season and limit basking opportunities, exerting strong selective pressure on thermoregulatory behaviour.

== Evolutionary History and Population Structure ==
A 2020 study identified four major, geographically distinct clades of the Metallic Skink: north-west, north-east (including mainland Australia and Bass Strait islands), south-east, and southern clades. These genetic divisions likely predate the last glacial event, persisting through multiple interglacial periods since the Pleistocene.

== Reproduction and Life Cycle ==
The Metallic Skink is viviparous, giving birth to live young rather than laying eggs. Mating occurs in autumn (March–May), with some late mating in spring (September–November). Males leave bite marks on the upper left chest of females during copulation. Females store sperm over winter (June–August) while in brumation, with ovulation and fertilisation occurring the following spring.

Gestation lasts approximately 18 weeks, after which females give birth to 1–8 offspring in summer or early autumn. While some nutrients are transferred through the placenta, most embryonic nutrition comes from the large yolk mass.

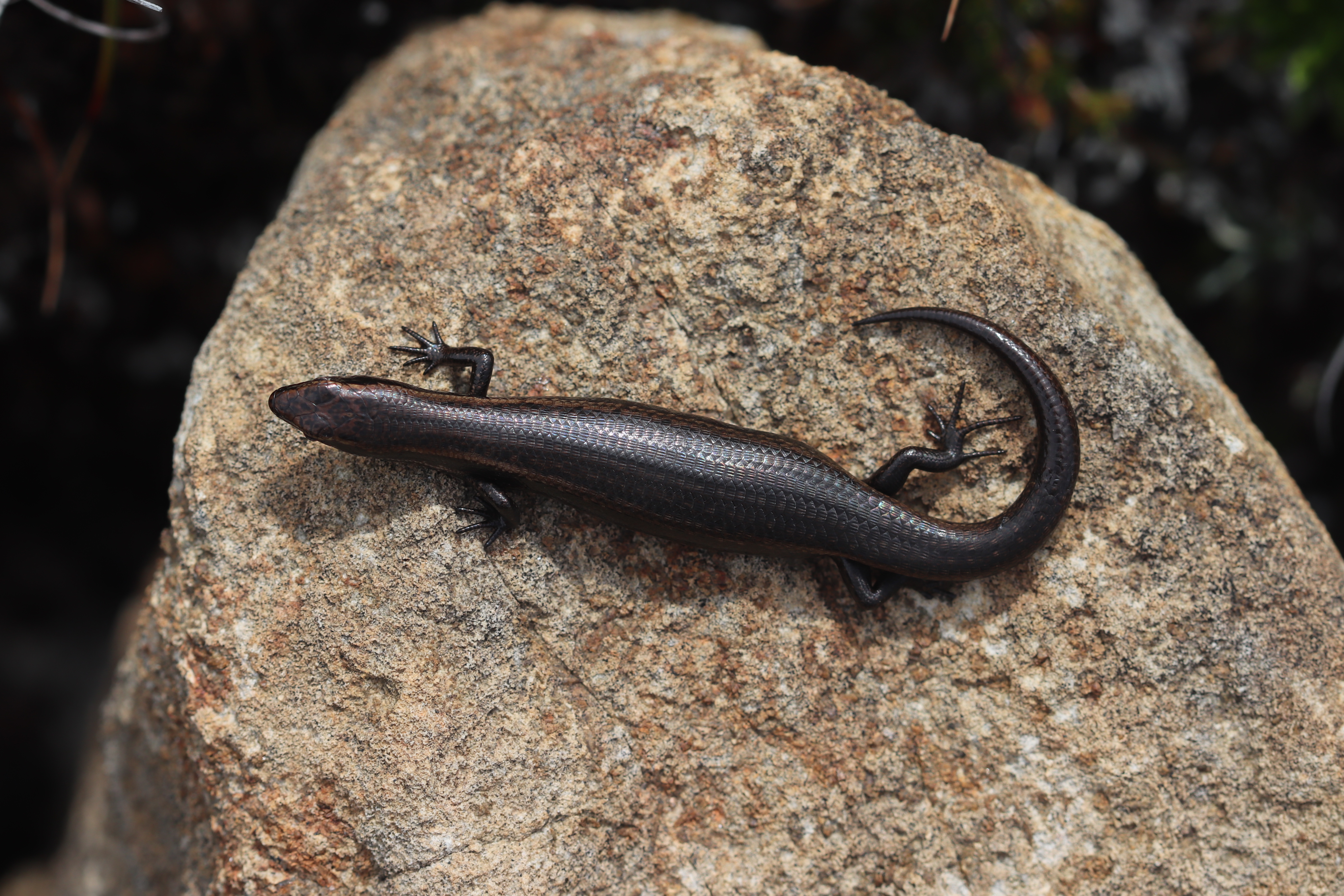
A Metallic Skink basking on a rock

Thermal conditions during embryonic development influence birth timing, size, mobility, and behaviour, which in turn affect offspring fitness. Since C. metallicus gives birth to live young, females can regulate embryonic temperature by adjusting their basking behaviour, reducing exposure to harmful temperature extremes. This thermoregulatory flexibility may shape offspring traits, enhancing survival in specific environmental conditions.

== Thermal Adaptation and Behaviour ==
The Metallic Skink maintains a lower body temperature than similar highland species, suggesting a higher critical thermal maximum and greater behavioural flexibility in response to temperature changes. Studies show that when basking opportunities are reduced, skinks compensate by increasing their basking time, ensuring optimal physiological function. This adaptability is likely a key factor in the species' evolutionary success across varying thermal environments. There are theories that as climate change progresses, lowland species such as the Metallic Skink featuring a higher critical thermal maximum can move into and take over highland species.

== Diet and Predation ==
The Metallic Skink is an active forager with an arthropod-based diet, feeding on a wide variety of small invertebrates. In turn, it is preyed upon by birds, snakes, and introduced predators such as cats. To evade predation, it relies on cryptic colouration, rapid movement, and sheltering behaviour. If threatened, it may shed its tail (autotomy), allowing escape while the detached tail distracts the predator.

A 2004 study investigated the impact of autotomy on thermoregulation, as Metallic Skinks store fat in their tails, potentially incurring a significant energetic cost. While autotomy primarily affects mobility and depletes energy reserves, these effects are temporary. Skinks begin to regain locomotor performance within 6–12 weeks when the tail is half-regrown, with full regeneration occurring after 3–5 months.

Carinascincus metallicus
