= Sisters Islands =

Sister or Sisters Island or Islands may refer to several individual islands or island groups:

== Antarctic ==
- The Sisters (Victoria Land), a pair of Antarctic islands consisting of Gertrude Rock and Rose Rock (Victoria Land)

== Australia ==
- Sisters Islands (Queensland)
- Sisters Island (Tasmania), north-west Tasmania
- Sisters Island Group, Tasmania, Furneaux Group
  - Inner Sister Island
  - Outer Sister Island
  - Shag Reef

== Canada ==
- Sisters Islands (Nunavut), Canada
- East Sister Island, Lake Erie, Ontario

== Cayman Islands ==
- Little Cayman
- Cayman Brac

== India ==
- The Sisters (Andaman), two islands in the Duncan Passage, Andaman Islands, India
  - East Sister Island (Andaman)
  - West Sister Island (Andaman)

== New Zealand ==
- The Sisters/Rangitatahi, Chatham Islands

== Singapore ==
- Sisters' Islands

== United States ==
- Sister Islands (Wisconsin)
- The Sisters (California)
- Middle Sister Island, Lake Erie, Ohio
- West Sister Island, Lake Erie, Ohio
- Sisters Island, Michigan, in Monroe County
- Sister Islands, in Lake Bonaparte (New York)
- A small group of islands just northwest of Grand Isle in Lake Champlain, Vermont

== See also ==
- Three Sisters Islands (disambiguation)
