= Little Waterhouse Island =

Island in Tasmania, Australia

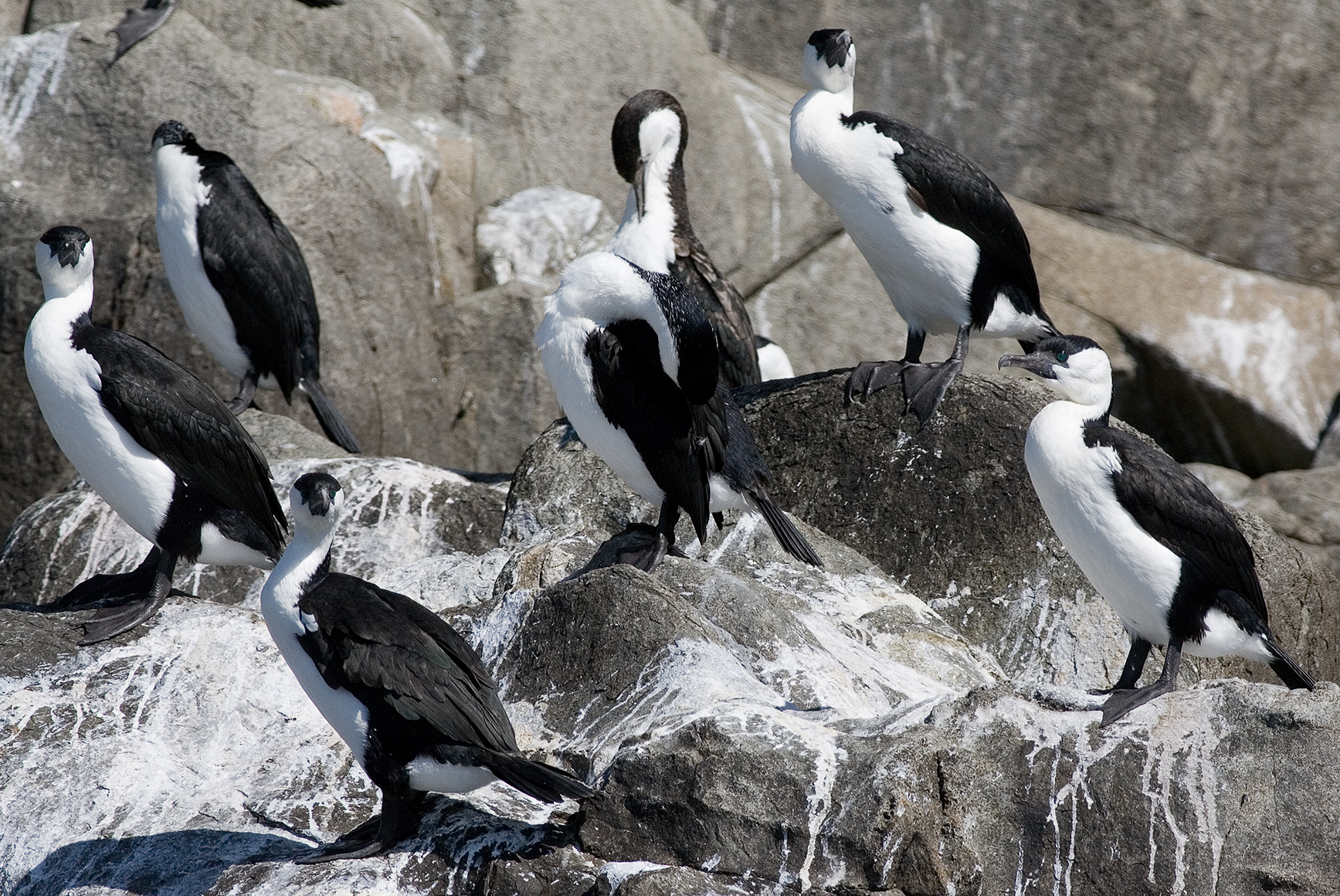
- The island is an important breeding site for black-faced cormorants.

- Location within Tasmania
- Etymology: Captain Henry Waterhouse

Geography
- Location: Banks Strait, Bass Strait
- Coordinates: 40°49′S 147°37′E
- Archipelago: Waterhouse Island Group
- Area: 2.5 ha (6.2 acres)

Administration
- Australia
- State: Tasmania

The Little Waterhouse Island, part of the Waterhouse Island Group, is a 2.5-hectare (6.2-acre) granite island situated in Banks Strait, part of Bass Strait, lying close to the north-eastern coast of Tasmania, Australia.

The Waterhouse Island Group includes the Waterhouse, Little Waterhouse, Swan, Little Swan, Cygnet, Foster, St Helens, Ninth, Tenth, Paddys, Maclean, and Baynes islands and the Bird Rock, and George Rocks islets with their associated reefs.

Most of the island is bare rock. The island forms part of the Ninth and Little Waterhouse Islands Important Bird Area (IBA), so identified by BirdLife International because it holds over 1% of the world population of black-faced cormorants.

== Fauna ==
As well as black-faced cormorants, recorded breeding seabird and wader species are the little penguin, Pacific gull, silver gull, sooty oystercatcher and Caspian tern.

== See also ==
- List of islands of Tasmania
