= Cygnet Island =

Island in Tasmania, Australia

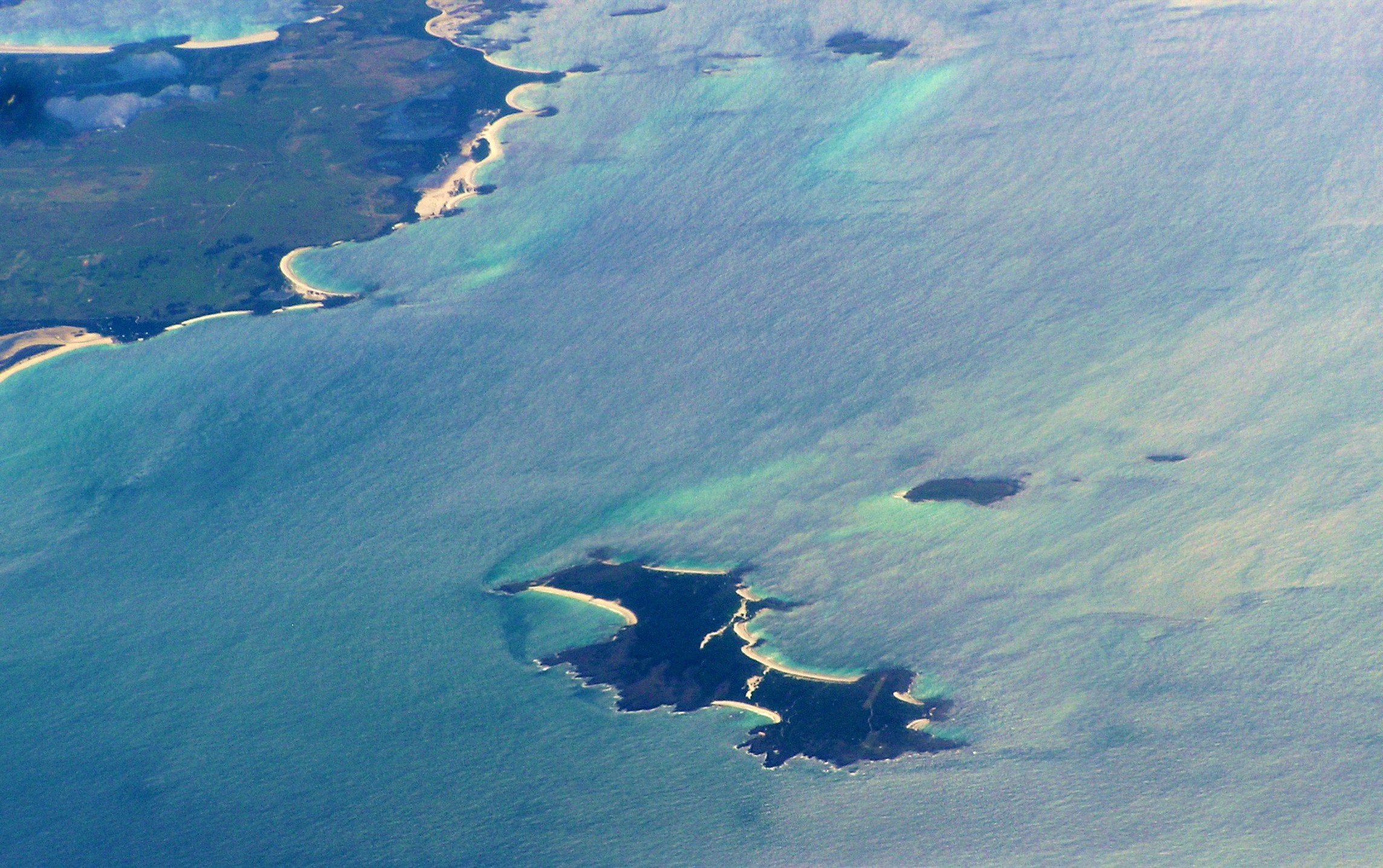
- Cygnet Island is the rightmost tiny island next to Little Swan Island.

- Location within Tasmania
- Etymology: Captain Henry Waterhouse

Geography
- Location: Banks Strait, Bass Strait
- Coordinates: 40°43′S 148°04′E
- Archipelago: Waterhouse Island Group
- Area: 0.5 ha (1.2 acres)

Administration
- Australia
- State: Tasmania

The Cygnet Island, part of the Waterhouse Island Group, is a 0.5-hectare (1.2-acre) granite islet situated in Banks Strait, part of Bass Strait, lying close to the north-eastern coast of Tasmania, Australia.

Other islands in the Waterhouse Group include Ninth, Tenth, Waterhouse, Little Waterhouse, Maclean, Baynes, Foster, Swan, Little Swan, St Helens and Paddys islands and Bird Rock and George Rocks islets.

== Fauna ==
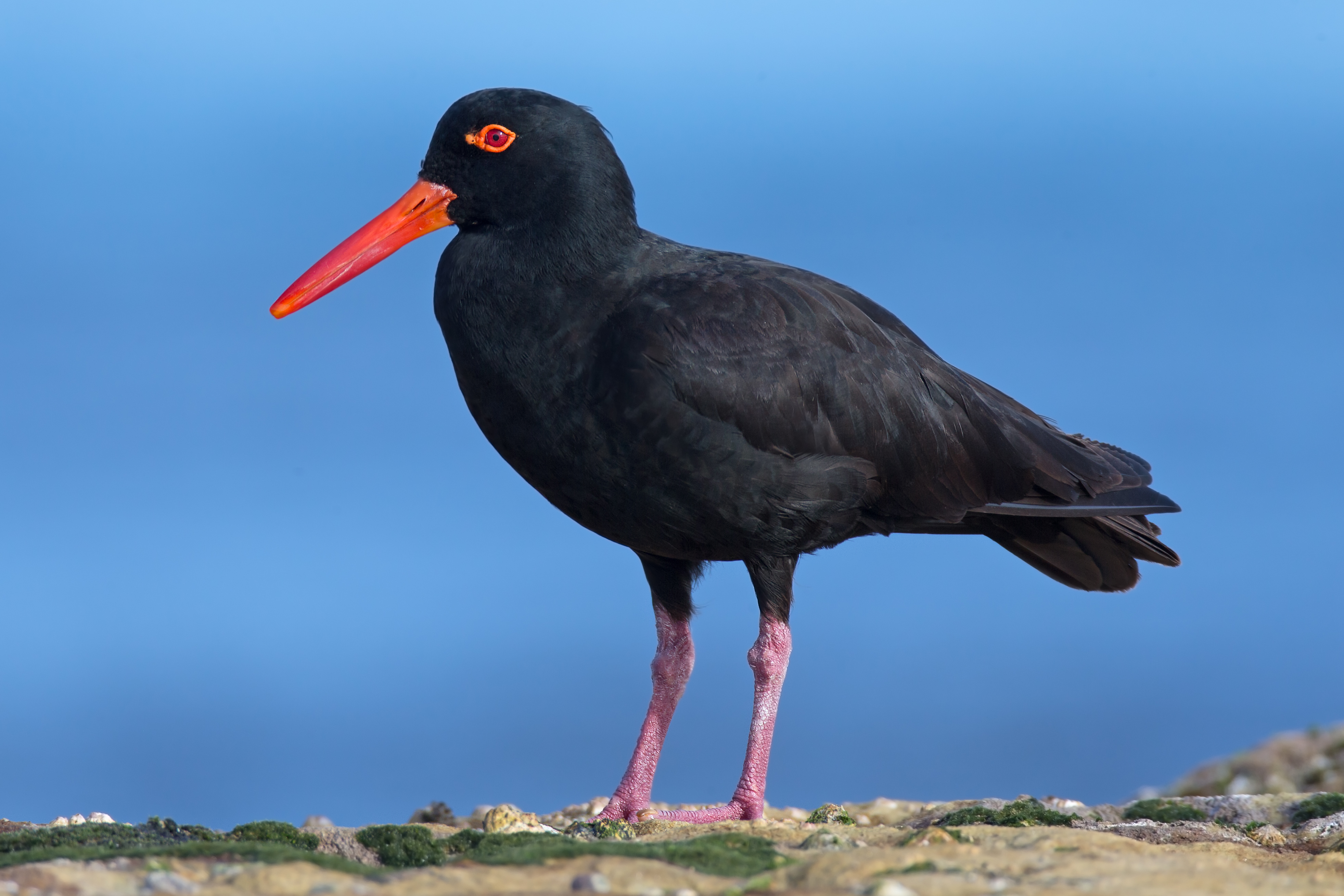
Sooty oystercatchers nest on the island

Recorded breeding seabird and wader species are Pacific gull, sooty oystercatcher and black-faced cormorant.

== See also ==
- List of islands of Tasmania
