= Baynes Island =

Island in Tasmania, Australia

- Location within Tasmania

Geography
- Location: Bass Strait
- Coordinates: 40°46′10″S 147°56′18″E
- Archipelago: Waterhouse Island Group
- Area: 1.62 ha (4.0 acres)

Administration
- Australia
- State: Tasmania

Demographics
- Population: uninhabited

Baynes Island, part of the Waterhouse Island Group, consists of a group of three granite uninhabited islets connected at low tide, with a combined area of 1.62 hectares (4.0 acres), situated in Banks Strait, part of Bass Strait, lying close to the north-eastern coast of Tasmania, Australia.

Other islands in the Waterhouse Group include Ninth, Tenth, Waterhouse, Little Waterhouse, Maclean, St Helens, Foster, Swan, Little Swan, Cygnet and Paddys islands and Bird Rock and George Rocks islets.

== Fauna ==
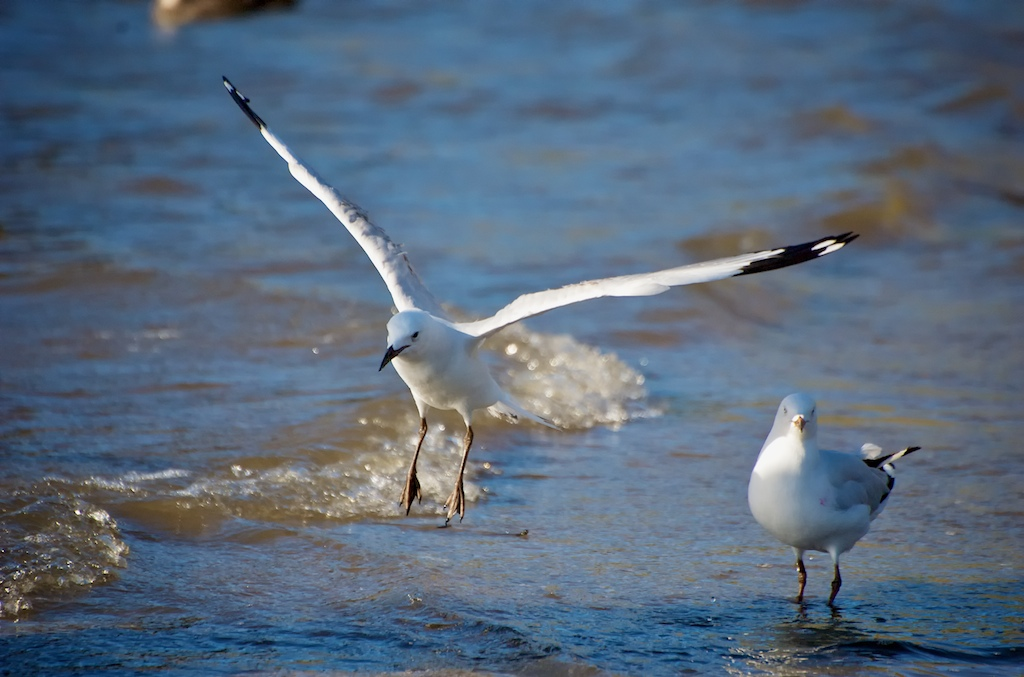
Silver gulls nest on the island

Recorded breeding seabird and wader species are little penguin, Pacific gull, silver gull, sooty oystercatcher, black-faced cormorant and Caspian tern. The grey teal has also nested on the island.

== See also ==
- List of islands of Tasmania
