= Ninth Island =

Island in Bass Strait, Tasmania

Native name: Tareerpattel-tarerenner
- Location within Tasmania

Geography
- Location: Bass Strait
- Coordinates: 40°50′S 147°16′E
- Archipelago: Waterhouse Island Group
- Area: 32 ha (79 acres)
- Length: 1.3 km (0.81 mi)
- Width: 550 m (1800 ft)

Administration
- Australia
- State: Tasmania

Demographics
- Population: uninhabited

The Ninth Island, officially Tareerpattel-tarerenner / Ninth Island, is a 32-hectare (79-acre) uninhabited granite island situated in Bass Strait as part of the Waterhouse Island Group, lying close to the north-eastern coast of Tasmania, Australia. In November 2018, it was listed for sale for the fourth time, at $1.98 million. The property for sale is a landlocked title within a conservation covenant, preventing access to the island by any means except helicopter.

== Fauna ==
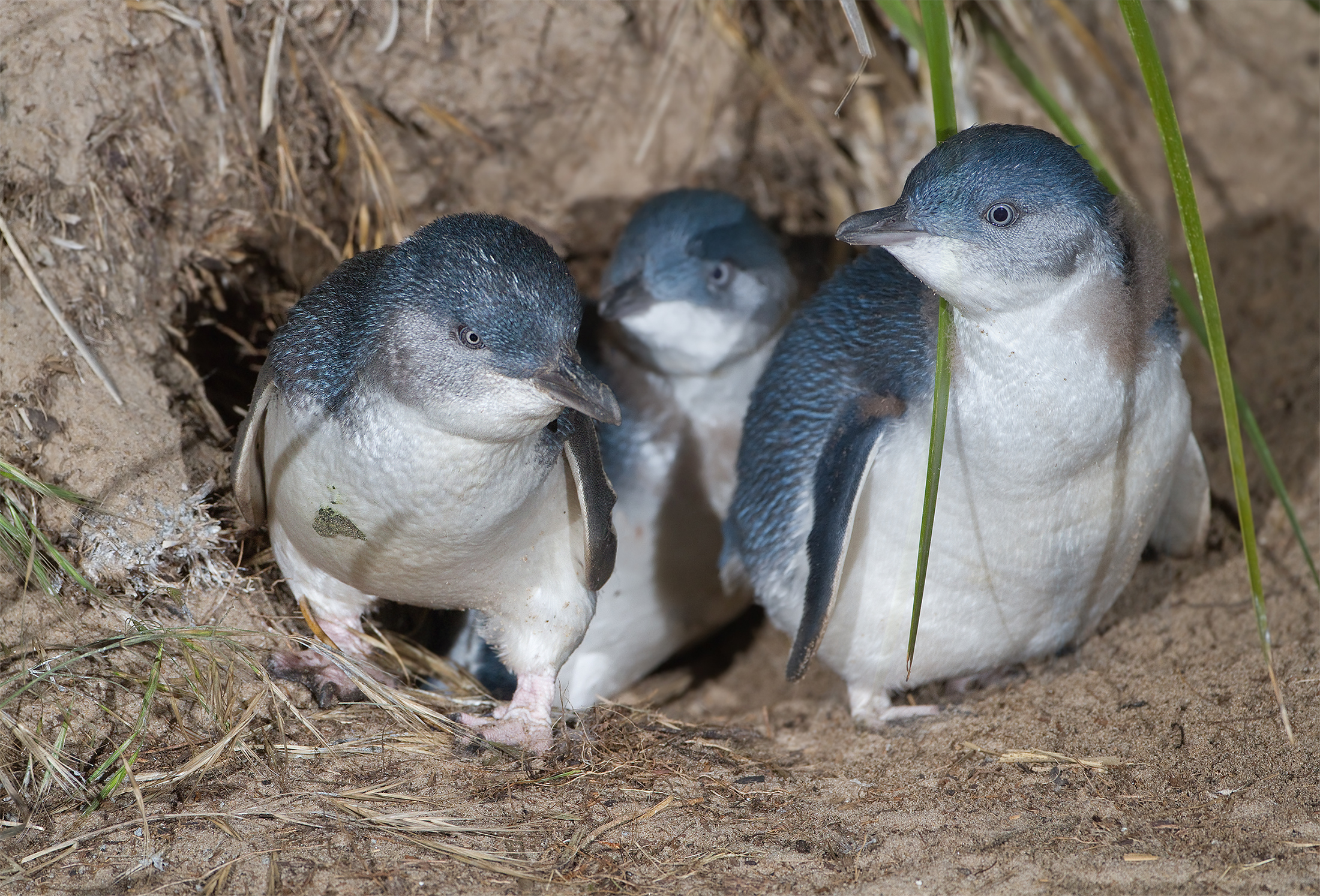
The island is home to thousands of little penguins.

As well as the black-faced cormorants, recorded breeding seabirds and waders include the little penguin, short-tailed shearwater, common diving-petrel, white-faced storm-petrel, Pacific gull, silver gull, sooty oystercatcher and crested tern. Cape Barren geese also breed there, European rabbits have been introduced and the southern grass skink is present.

The island is approximately 1.3 kilometres (0.81 mi) long and 550 metres (1,800 ft) wide, lying 11.7 kilometres (7.3 mi) from the north-eastern coast of Tasmania. It is partly privately owned and has been badly affected in the past by grazing, frequent fires and, in July 1995, by the Iron Baron oil spill which killed between 2,000 and 6,000 little penguins. The island forms part of the Ninth and Little Waterhouse Islands Important Bird Area (IBA), so identified by BirdLife International because it holds over 1% of the world population of black-faced cormorants.

== Ownership and conservation ==
In approx 1988–1989, Ninth Island was purchased for A$64,000. In February 2015, Ninth Island was advertised for sale with an asking price of A$500,000; however in July it was passed in at auction for A$1.19 million.

The island currently does not have a jetty or an airstrip, so the only way to access the island is via helicopter.

In 2012 the 26.4-hectare (65-acre) Ninth Island Conservation Area was formed on the island. This conservation area completely surrounds the central hill on the island and extends all the way to the shoreline. In addition, the full tidal region of the island's shoreline has been designated Tidal Crown Land, managed by the Tasmanian National Parks and Wildlife Service. A conservation covenant exists on the island, owing to the fact a mutton-bird rookery exists on the island.

== Region ==
Other islands in the Waterhouse Group include St Helens, Tenth, Waterhouse, Little Waterhouse, Maclean, Baynes, Foster, Swan, Little Swan, Cygnet and Paddys islands and Bird Rock and George Rocks islets.

The island is situated within the Dorset Municipality.

== See also ==
- List of islands of Tasmania
