= Paddys Island =

Island in Tasmania, Australia

- Location within Tasmania

Geography
- Location: Tasman Sea
- Coordinates: 41°23′S 148°18′E
- Archipelago: Waterhouse Island Group
- Area: 4.6 ha (11 acres)

Administration
- Australia
- State: Tasmania

Demographics
- Population: uninhabited

The Paddys Island, part of the Waterhouse Island Group, is a 4.6-hectare (11-acre) uninhabited granite island situated in the Tasman Sea, lying close to the north-eastern coast of Tasmania, Australia.

Other islands in the Waterhouse Group include Ninth, Tenth, Waterhouse, Little Waterhouse, Maclean, Baynes, Foster, Swan, Little Swan, Cygnet and St Helens islands and Bird Rock and George Rocks islets.

== Fauna ==
The island forms part of the St Helens Important Bird Area, identified as such by BirdLife International because of its importance as a breeding site for seabirds and waders.

Recorded breeding seabird and wader species are little penguin, Pacific gull, silver gull, kelp gull, sooty oystercatcher and Caspian tern.

== See also ==
- List of islands of Tasmania
