= Tenth Island =

Island in Tasmania, Australia

Tenth Island (Roobala mangana)
Nickname: Barrenjoey
- Location within Tasmania

Geography
- Location: Bass Strait
- Coordinates: 40°56′S 146°59′E
- Archipelago: Waterhouse Island Group
- Area: 900 m^{2} (9,700 sq ft)

Administration
- Australia
- State: Tasmania

Demographics
- Population: uninhabited

The Tenth Island, sometimes called Barrenjoey, part of the Waterhouse Island Group, is a 900-square-metre (9,700 sq ft) uninhabited granite islet and nature reserve, situated in Bass Strait, lying close to the north-eastern coast of Tasmania, Australia. The islet has no vegetation and much of it is wave-washed in winter storms. The Aboriginal name for the island is recorded as Roobala mangana.

Other islands in the Waterhouse Group include Ninth, Maclean, Waterhouse, Little Waterhouse, Baynes, St Helens, Foster, Swan, Little Swan, Cygnet and Paddys islands and Bird Rock and George Rocks islets.

== Fauna and marine life ==
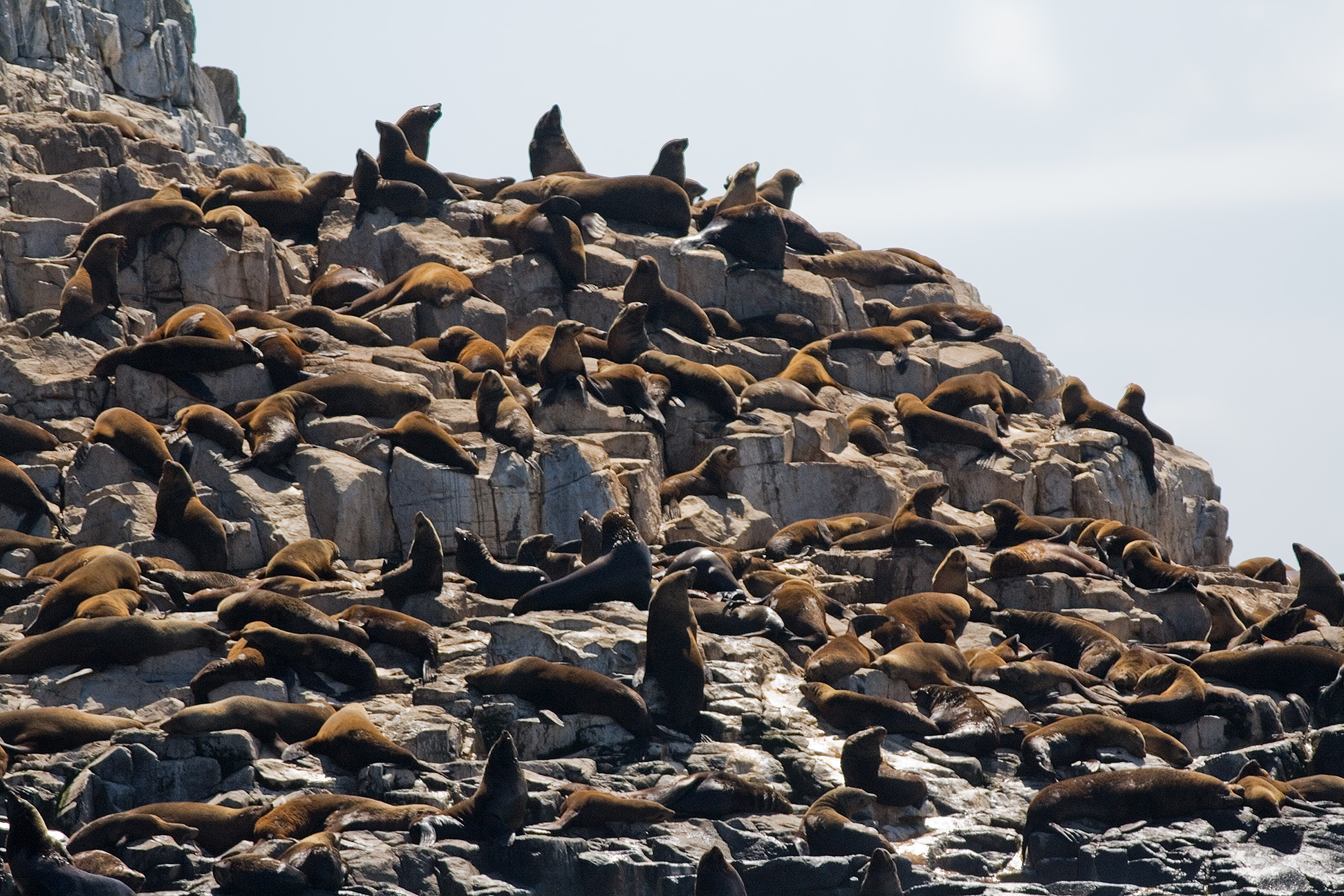
The island is important as a breeding site for Australian fur seals.

The island is home to a significant breeding colony of Australian fur seals, with up to 400 pups born each year, though many drown in storms. black-faced cormorants also breed on the island and little penguins roost there.

In the waters surrounding Tenth Island, Therese Cartwright, aged 35 years and a mother of five children, was killed as a result of a human shark attack fatality on 5 June 1993 when a reportedly 5-metre (16 ft) long great white shark (Carcharodon carcharias) attacked Cartwright while she was scuba diving at the seal colony.

== See also ==
- List of islands of Tasmania
