= Shag Reef =

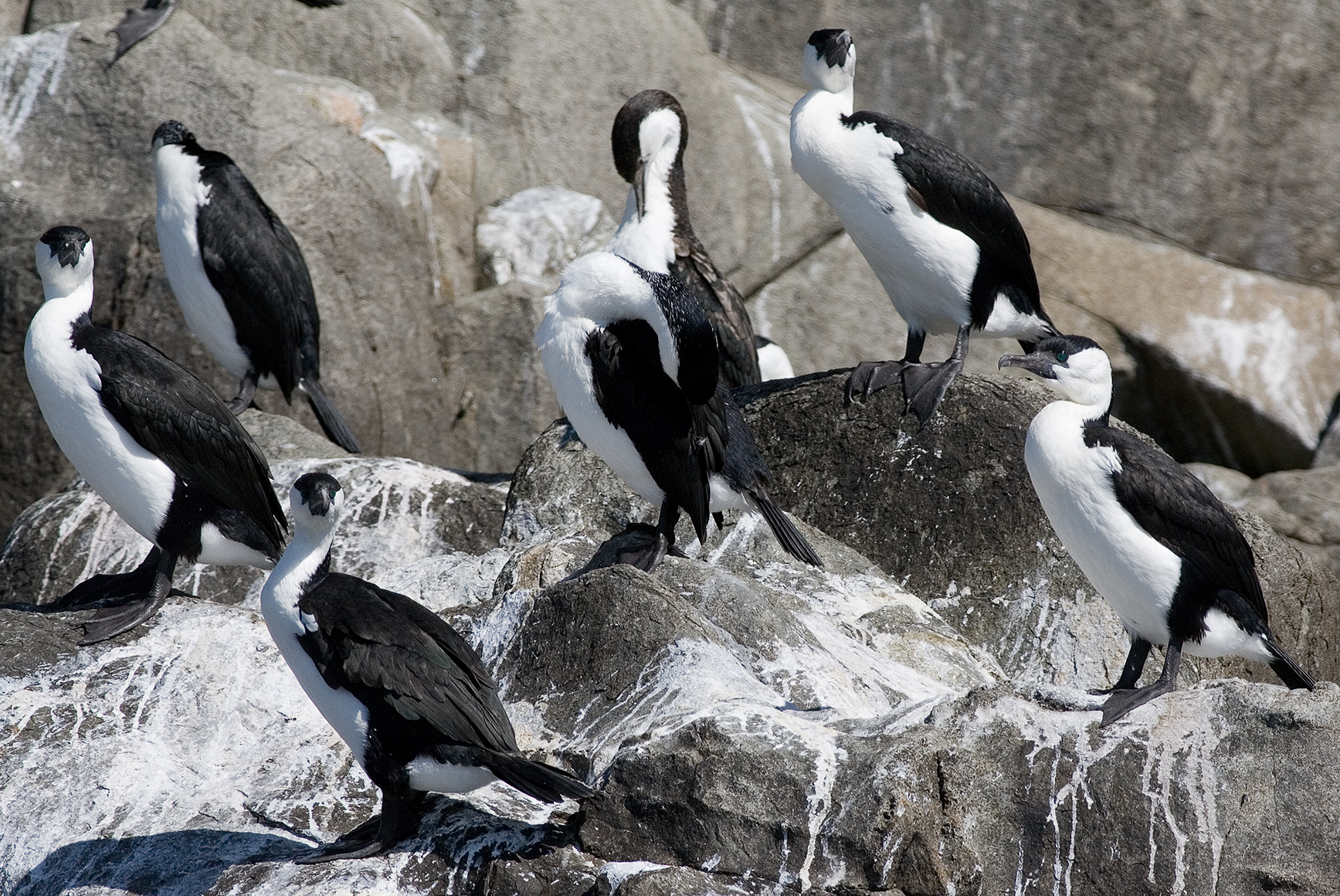
- The island is an important site for black-faced cormorants

Geography
- Location: Tasmania, Australia
- Adjacent to: Bass Strait
- Major islands: Tasmania
- Area: 0.0124 km^{2} (0.0048 sq mi)

Administration
- Australia

Shag Reef, part of the Sister Islands Conservation Area, is a small granite island, with an area of 1.24 hectares (3.1 acres) located in Bass Strait, Tasmania, Australia.

== Location and features ==
The Shag Reef is located north of Flinders Island in the Furneaux Group. The island has been identified by BirdLife International as an Important Bird Area (IBA) because it supports over 1% of the world population of black-faced cormorants, with 500-600 individual birds. As well as the cormorants, seabirds and waders recorded as breeding on the island include silver and Pacific gulls, Caspian terns and sooty oystercatchers.

== See also ==
- Inner Sister Island
- Outer Sister Island
