= Foster Islands (Tasmania) =

Island in Tasmania, Australia

- Landsat image of Foster Islands, Bass Strait, Tasmania

- Location within Tasmania

Geography
- Location: Banks Strait, Bass Strait
- Coordinates: 40°43′S 147°58′E
- Archipelago: Waterhouse Island Group
- Area: 48 ha (120 acres)

Administration
- Australia
- State: Tasmania

The Foster Islands, part of the Waterhouse Island Group, are two small granite islands with a combined area of 48 hectares (120 acres) situated in Banks Strait, part of Bass Strait, lying close to the north-eastern coast of Tasmania, Australia. The islands form part of Small Bass Strait Island nature reserve.

Other islands in the Waterhouse Group include Ninth, Tenth, Waterhouse, Little Waterhouse, Maclean, Baynes, Gygnet, Swan, Little Swan, St Helens and Paddys islands and Bird Rock and George Rocks islets.

== Fauna ==
Recorded breeding seabird and wader species are little penguin, short-tailed shearwater, white-faced storm-petrel, Pacific gull, sooty oystercatcher and Australian pelican. Cape Barren geese also breed on the island. The metallic skink is present.

== See also ==
- List of islands of Tasmania
