= St Helens Island =

Island in Tasmania, Australia

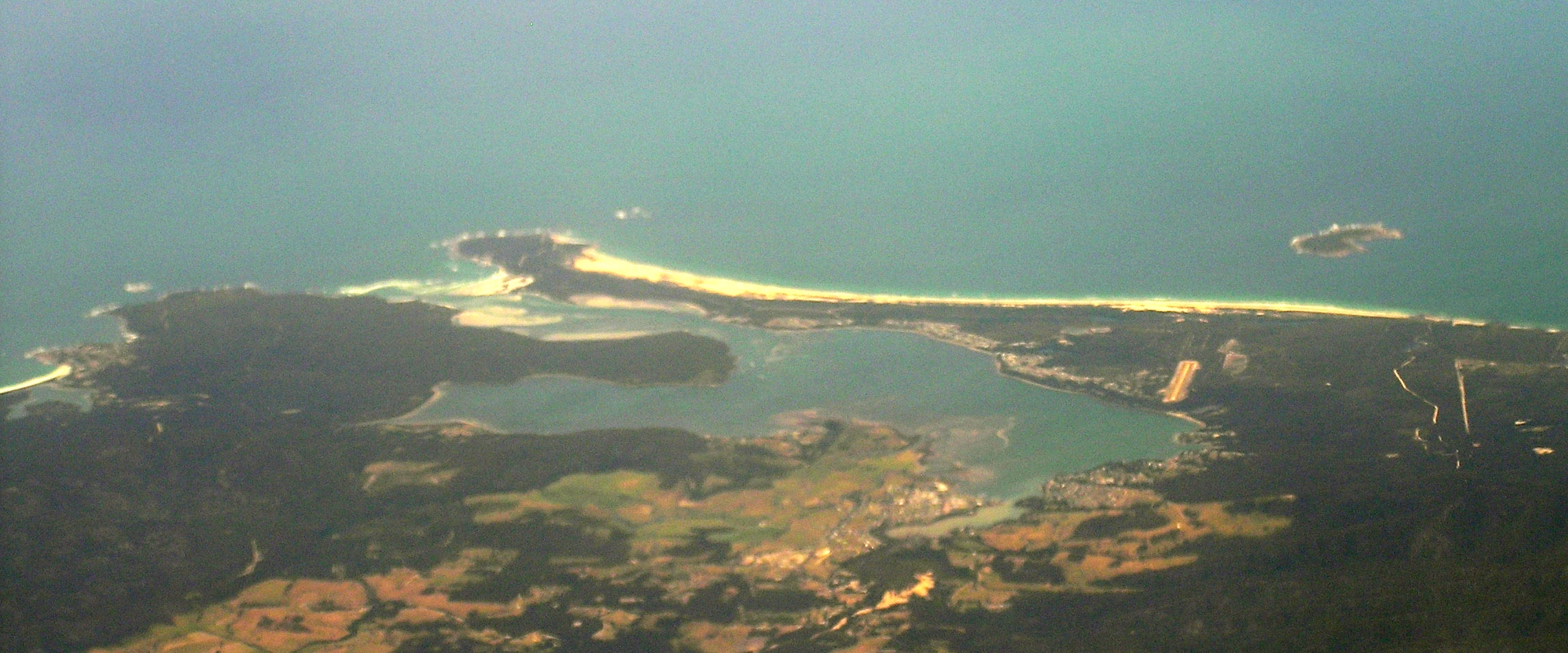
- St Helens Island is on the right hand side of this aerial photo

- Location within Tasmania

Geography
- Location: Tasman Sea
- Coordinates: 41°20′S 148°20′E
- Archipelago: Waterhouse Island Group
- Area: 51 ha (130 acres)

Administration
- Australia
- State: Tasmania

The St Helens Island, part of the Waterhouse Island Group, is a 51-hectare (130-acre) granite island situated in the Tasman Sea, lying close to the north-eastern coast of Tasmania, Australia.

Other islands in the Waterhouse Group include Ninth, Tenth, Waterhouse, Little Waterhouse, Maclean, Baynes, Foster, Swan, Little Swan, Cygnet and Paddys islands and Bird Rock and George Rocks islets.

== History ==
Three applications were made to the colonial government in 1841, each for three acres, to operate shore-based whaling stations on the island. It is not clear if all or any of these was taken up.

== Fauna ==
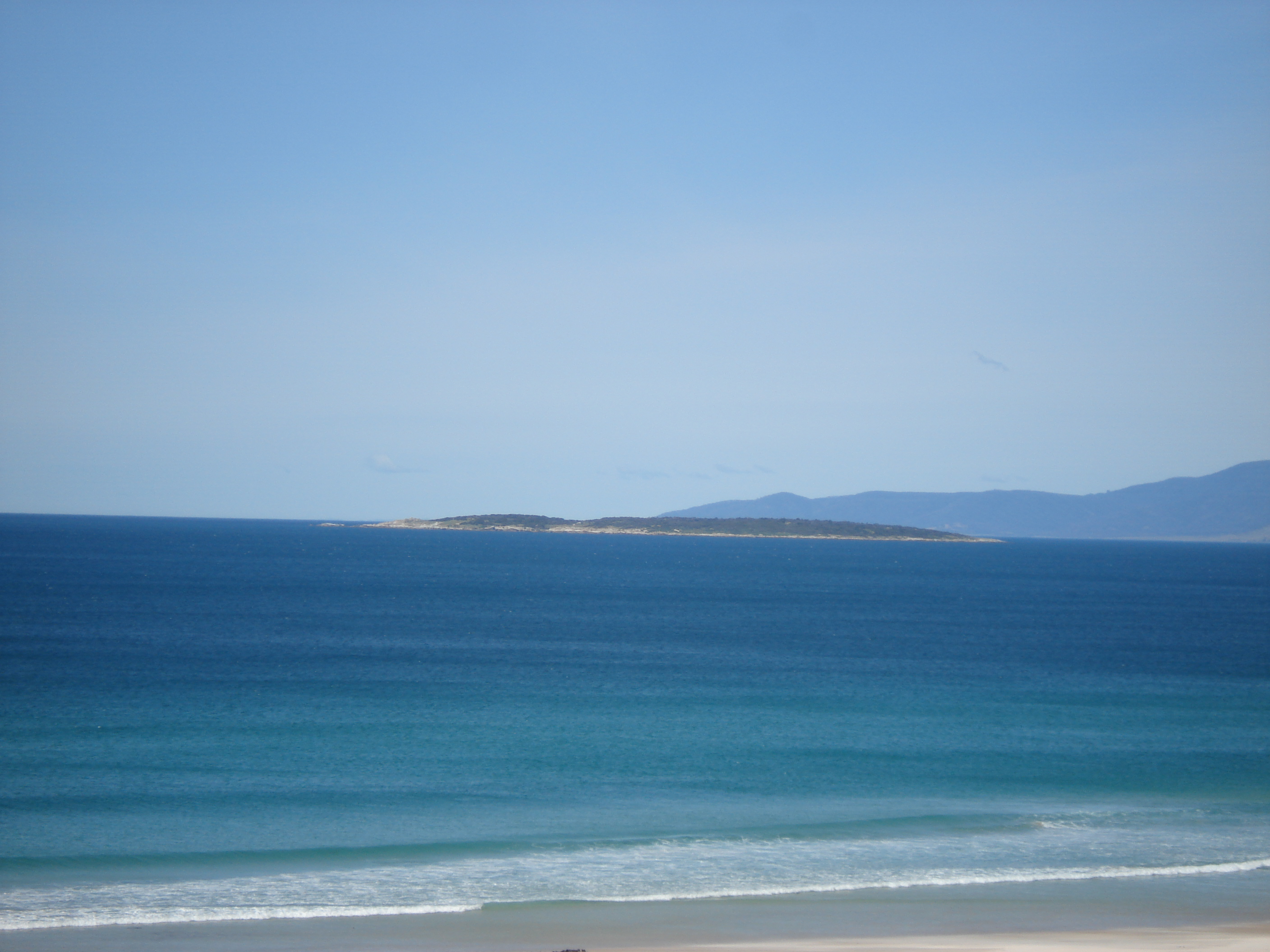
View of St Helens Island

The island is a conservation area, though it has been burnt in the past and is still subject to severe rabbit grazing. The island forms part of the St Helens Important Bird Area, identified as such by BirdLife International because of its importance as a breeding site for seabirds and waders.

Recorded breeding seabird species are little penguin, short-tailed shearwater, common diving-petrel, white-faced storm-petrel, Pacific gull and silver gull. European rabbits have been introduced. The metallic skink is present.

== See also ==
- List of islands of Tasmania
