= Bird Rock (Tasmania) =

Island in Tasmania, Australia

- Location within Tasmania

Geography
- Location: Banks Strait, Bass Strait
- Coordinates: 40°55′S 148°19′E
- Archipelago: Waterhouse Island Group
- Area: 1 ha (2.5 acres)

Administration
- Australia
- State: Tasmania

Demographics
- Population: uninhabited

The Bird Rock, part of the Waterhouse Island Group, is an uninhabited 1-hectare (2.5-acre) granite islet situated in Banks Strait, part of Bass Strait, lying close to the north-eastern coast of Tasmania, Australia.

Other islands in the Waterhouse Group include Ninth, Tenth, Waterhouse, Little Waterhouse, Maclean, Baynes, Cygnet, Swan, Foster, Little Swan, St Helens and Paddys islands and George Rocks islet.

== Fauna ==
Recorded breeding seabird species are little penguin, common diving-petrel, Pacific gull and Caspian tern.

== See also ==
- List of islands of Tasmania
