= Swan Island (Tasmania) =

Island in Bass Strait, Tasmania

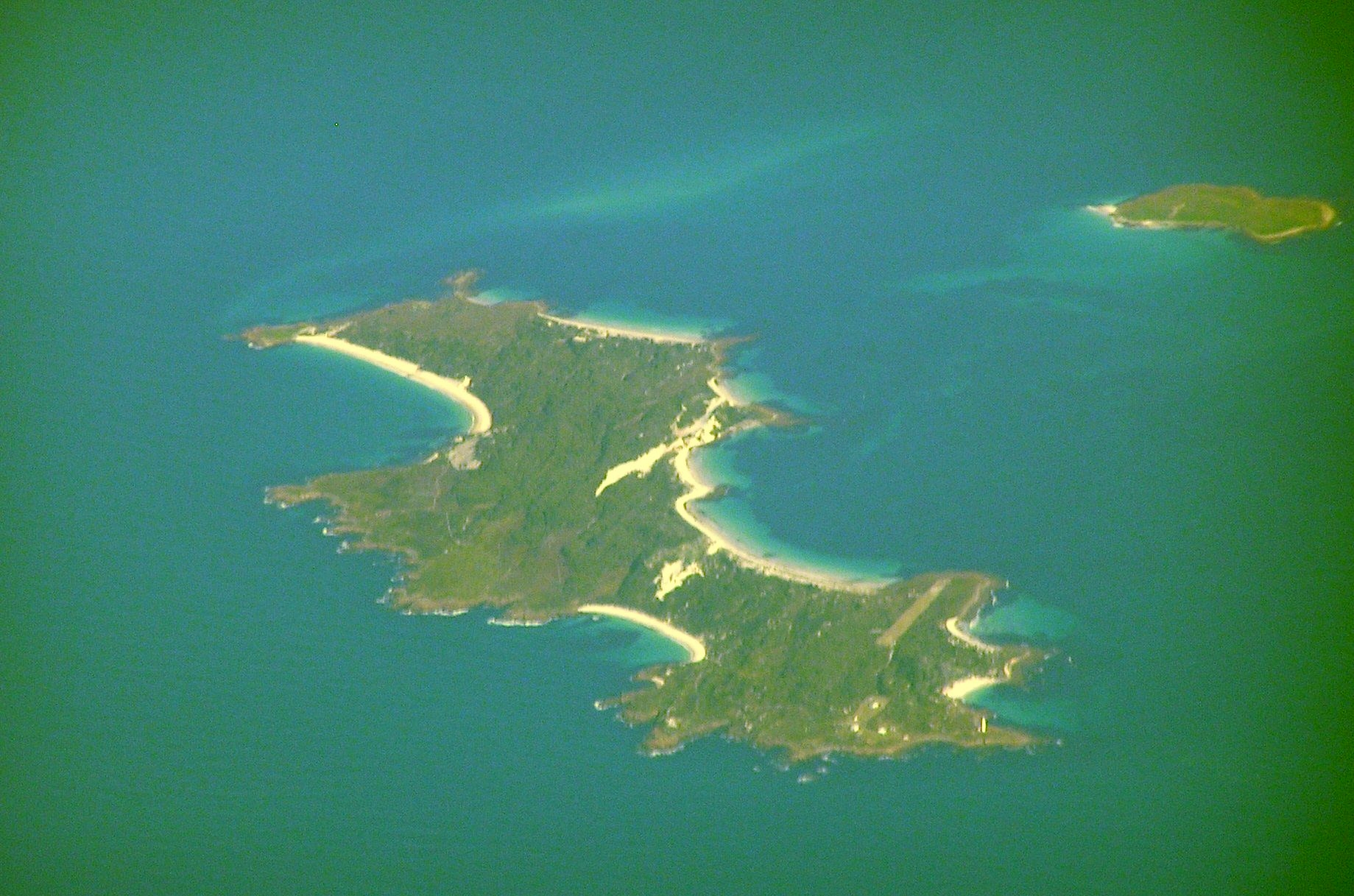
- Swan Island, viewed from the east.

- Location within Tasmania

Geography
- Location: Banks Strait, Bass Strait
- Coordinates: 40°44′S 148°06′E
- Archipelago: Waterhouse Island Group
- Area: 239 ha (590 acres)

Administration
- Australia
- State: Tasmania

Swan Island, part of the Waterhouse Island Group, is a 239-hectare (590-acre) granite island situated in Banks Strait, part of Bass Strait, lying close to the north-eastern coast of Tasmania, Australia.

Part of the island is privately owned and it contains an automated lighthouse, several houses and an airstrip. It has previously been subject to grazing by livestock. Several shipwrecks have been recorded here of vessels passing through Banks Strait; Brenda (1832), Mystery (1850), Union (1852).

Other islands in the Waterhouse Group include the Ninth, Tenth, Waterhouse, Little Waterhouse, Maclean, Baynes, Cygnet, Foster, Little Swan, Bird Rock, George Rocks, St Helens, and Paddys islands.

== History ==
Seal hunting took place here from at least 1805 when a sealing party of nine men were put ashore from the British whaler Ceres (Captain Thompson).

== Geography and Environment ==
=== Climate ===
Swan Island experiences an oceanic climate (Köppen: Cfb) with tepid, drier summers and quite mild, slightly wetter winters. The wettest recorded day was 24 March 2011 with 121.2 mm (4.77 in) of rainfall. Extreme temperatures ranged from 31.9 °C (89.4 °F) on 29 January 2009 to 2.2 °C (36.0 °F) on 21 August 2013.

Climate data for Swan Island (40.73°S 148.13°E) (15 m (49 ft) AMSL) (2001-2025)
Month	Jan	Feb	Mar	Apr	May	Jun	Jul	Aug	Sep	Oct	Nov	Dec	Year
Record high °C (°F)	31.9 (89.4)	30.3 (86.5)	29.7 (85.5)	24.5 (76.1)	21.6 (70.9)	18.0 (64.4)	17.6 (63.7)	18.1 (64.6)	21.4 (70.5)	23.0 (73.4)	29.7 (85.5)	28.4 (83.1)	31.9 (89.4)
Mean daily maximum °C (°F)	21.2 (70.2)	21.3 (70.3)	20.6 (69.1)	18.3 (64.9)	16.0 (60.8)	14.1 (57.4)	13.3 (55.9)	13.6 (56.5)	14.7 (58.5)	16.1 (61.0)	17.8 (64.0)	19.5 (67.1)	17.2 (63.0)
Mean daily minimum °C (°F)	15.2 (59.4)	15.5 (59.9)	14.6 (58.3)	12.9 (55.2)	10.8 (51.4)	9.2 (48.6)	8.5 (47.3)	8.5 (47.3)	9.2 (48.6)	10.4 (50.7)	12.0 (53.6)	13.4 (56.1)	11.7 (53.0)
Record low °C (°F)	8.6 (47.5)	8.7 (47.7)	6.8 (44.2)	6.1 (43.0)	4.3 (39.7)	2.8 (37.0)	3.1 (37.6)	2.2 (36.0)	3.1 (37.6)	3.8 (38.8)	4.6 (40.3)	6.7 (44.1)	2.2 (36.0)
Average precipitation mm (inches)	42.0 (1.65)	38.9 (1.53)	53.2 (2.09)	45.2 (1.78)	52.8 (2.08)	57.4 (2.26)	62.6 (2.46)	55.6 (2.19)	50.5 (1.99)	50.8 (2.00)	56.0 (2.20)	43.4 (1.71)	607.4 (23.91)
Average precipitation days (≥ 0.2 mm)	7.7	8.0	9.2	12.6	14.4	16.5	17.3	16.4	13.4	11.9	11.3	9.3	148
Source: Bureau of Meteorology (2001-2025)

=== Fauna ===
Swan Island forms part of the Cape Portland Important Bird Area. Recorded breeding seabird and wader species are little penguin, short-tailed shearwater, Pacific gull, silver gull, sooty oystercatcher, pied oystercatcher, hooded plover, Caspian tern and crested tern. Cape Barren geese also nest on the island. Reptiles present include the metallic skink, White's skink, Bougainville's skink and tiger snake. European rabbits and house mice are present.

== See also ==
- List of islands of Tasmania
