= George Rocks =

Islands in Tasmania, Australia

- Location within Tasmania

Geography
- Location: Banks Strait, Bass Strait
- Coordinates: 40°55′S 148°19′E
- Archipelago: Waterhouse Island Group
- Area: 7 ha (17 acres)

Administration
- Australia
- State: Tasmania

Demographics
- Population: uninhabited

The George Rocks, also historically known as King George's Rocks, is part of the Waterhouse Island Group, a group of three adjacent uninhabited granite islets and associated reefs with a combined area of 7 hectares (17 acres), situated in Banks Strait, part of Bass Strait, lying close to the north-eastern coast of Tasmania, Australia.

== History ==
Northeastern Tasmanian was spoken in the George Rocks area by Tasmanian Aborigines but became extinct during the 19th century.

Seal hunting took place early in the 19th century. Captain James Kelly took seals there in 1816, and Thomas Tucker is recorded sealing on the rocks in 1827. Captain Kelly applied for a lease to establish a bay whaling station at a small sandy beach on the west side of the largest of the rocks in 1841

== Geography ==
Other islands in the Waterhouse Group include Ninth, Tenth, Waterhouse, Little Waterhouse, Maclean, Baynes, Gygnet, Swan, Foster, Little Swan, St Helens and Paddys islands and Bird Rock islet.

== Fauna ==
Recorded breeding seabird species are little penguin, short-tailed shearwater, white-faced storm-petrel, silver gull, black-faced cormorant and crested tern. Introduced mammals are rabbits and rats (it was announced in February 2021 that all the rats had been eradicated). The metallic skink is present.

== See also ==
- List of islands of Tasmania
