= Little Swan Island =

Island in Tasmania, Australia

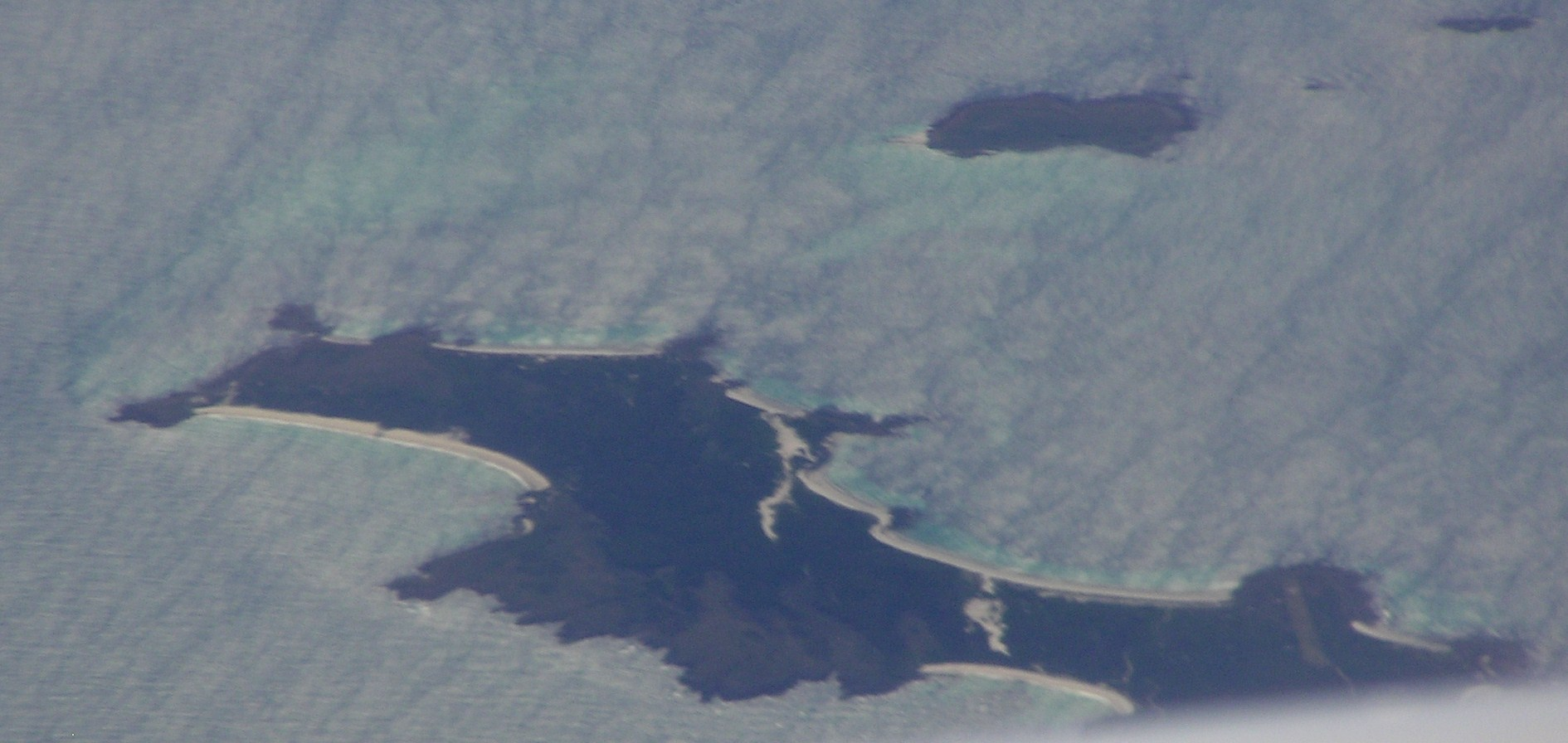
- Little Swan Island lies behind Swan Island in this aerial photo.

- Location within Tasmania

Geography
- Location: Banks Strait, Bass Strait
- Coordinates: 40°43′S 148°04′E
- Archipelago: Waterhouse Island Group
- Area: 12.64 ha (31.2 acres)

Administration
- Australia
- State: Tasmania

Demographics
- Population: uninhabited

The Little Swan Island, part of the Waterhouse Island Group, is a 12.64-hectare (31.2-acre) uninhabited granite island situated in Banks Strait, part of Bass Strait, lying close to the north-eastern coast of Tasmania, Australia.

Other islands in the Waterhouse Group include the Ninth, Tenth, Waterhouse, Little Waterhouse, Maclean, Baynes, Cygnet, Foster, Swan, Bird Rock, George Rocks, St Helens, and Paddys islands.

== Fauna ==
Recorded breeding seabird and wader species are little penguin, short-tailed shearwater, common diving-petrel, white-faced storm-petrel, Pacific gull, sooty oystercatcher and Australian pelican. The pelican colony is the southernmost in Australia. The metallic skink is present.

== See also ==
- List of islands of Tasmania
