= St Helens Important Bird Area =

Important Bird Area in Tasmania, Australia

Coordinates: 41°18′23″S 148°18′23″E

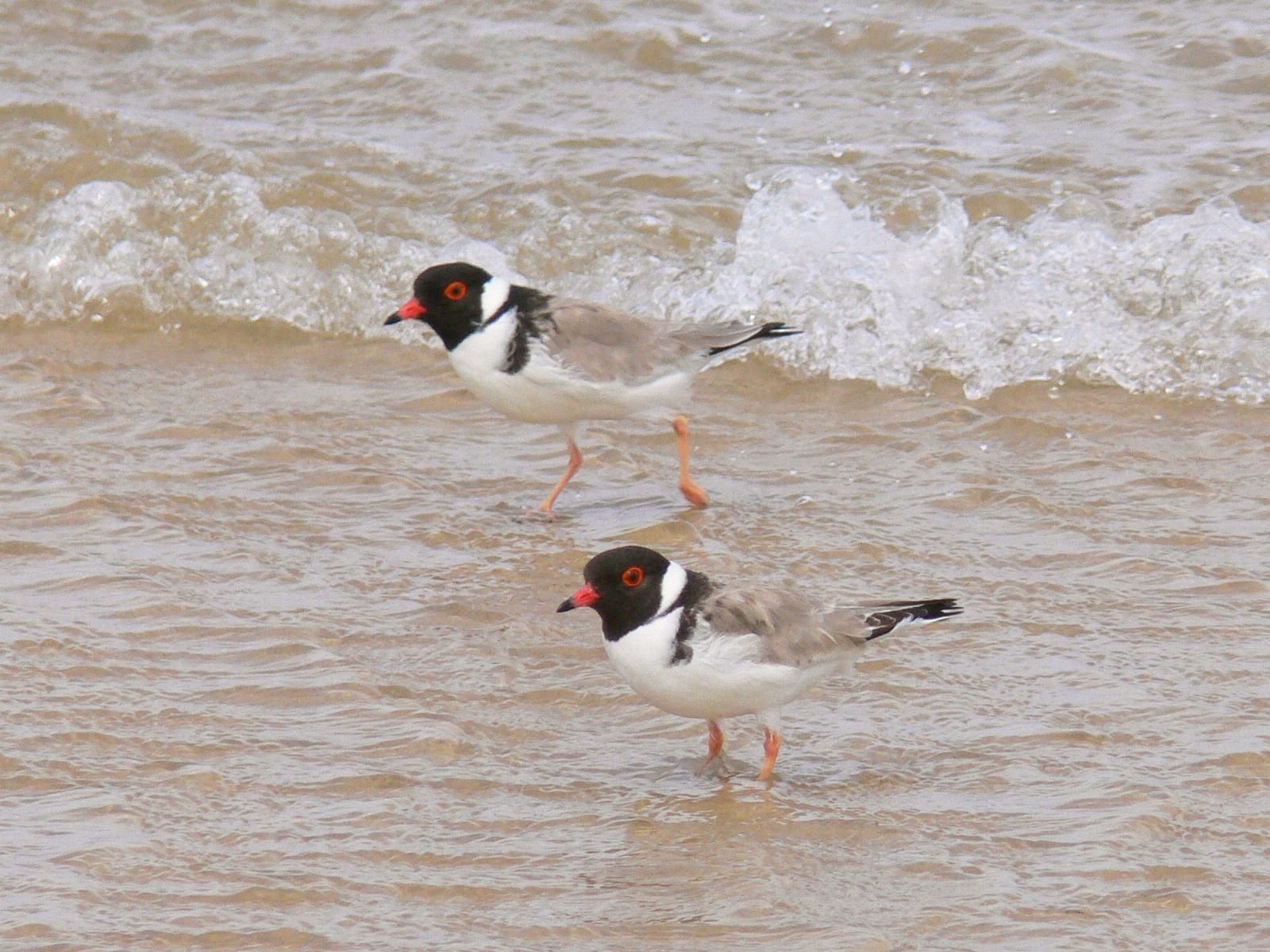
The IBA is an important area for hooded plovers

St Helens Important Bird Area comprises four separate sites, with a collective total area of 24 km^{2}, in the vicinity of the town of St Helens on the northern part of the east coast of Tasmania, south-eastern Australia.

== Description ==
The sites constituting the Important Bird Area (IBA) are Paddys and St Helens Islands, the 9 km Maurouard Beach on the adjacent coast, with the Peron Dunes backing the beach, and the inner parts of Georges Bay. The islands are granitic with rocky shorelines and are home to seabird colonies. The beach is sandy and exposed to the ocean. The bay has intertidal flats that provide feeding habitat for waders, or shorebirds.

== Birds ==
The set of sites has been identified by BirdLife International as an IBA because it supports over 1% of the world populations of Pacific gulls (Paddys Island), little penguins (with up to 15,000 breeding pairs on St Helens Island), pied oystercatchers (Georges Bay) and significant numbers of fairy terns and hooded plovers (Maurouard Beach and Peron Dunes). Other seabirds breeding on the islands include 10,000 pairs of white-faced storm-petrels, 2350 pairs of short-tailed shearwaters and 10 pairs of common diving-petrels on St Helens Island, as well as small numbers of Caspian terns and kelp gulls on Paddys Island.

== See also ==
St Helens, Tasmania
