= Maclean Island =

Island in Tasmania, Australia

- Location within Tasmania

Geography
- Location: Bass Strait
- Coordinates: 40°45′S 147°56′E
- Archipelago: Waterhouse Island Group
- Area: 1.11 ha (2.7 acres)

Administration
- Australia
- State: Tasmania

Demographics
- Population: uninhabited

The Maclean Island, part of the Waterhouse Island Group, is a 1.11-hectare (2.7-acre) uninhabited granite islet, situated in Banks Strait, part of Bass Strait, lying close to the north-eastern coast of Tasmania, Australia.

Other islands in the Waterhouse Group include Ninth, Tenth, Waterhouse, Little Waterhouse, Baynes, St Helens, Foster, Swan, Little Swan, Cygnet and Paddys islands and Bird Rock and George Rocks islets.

== Fauna ==
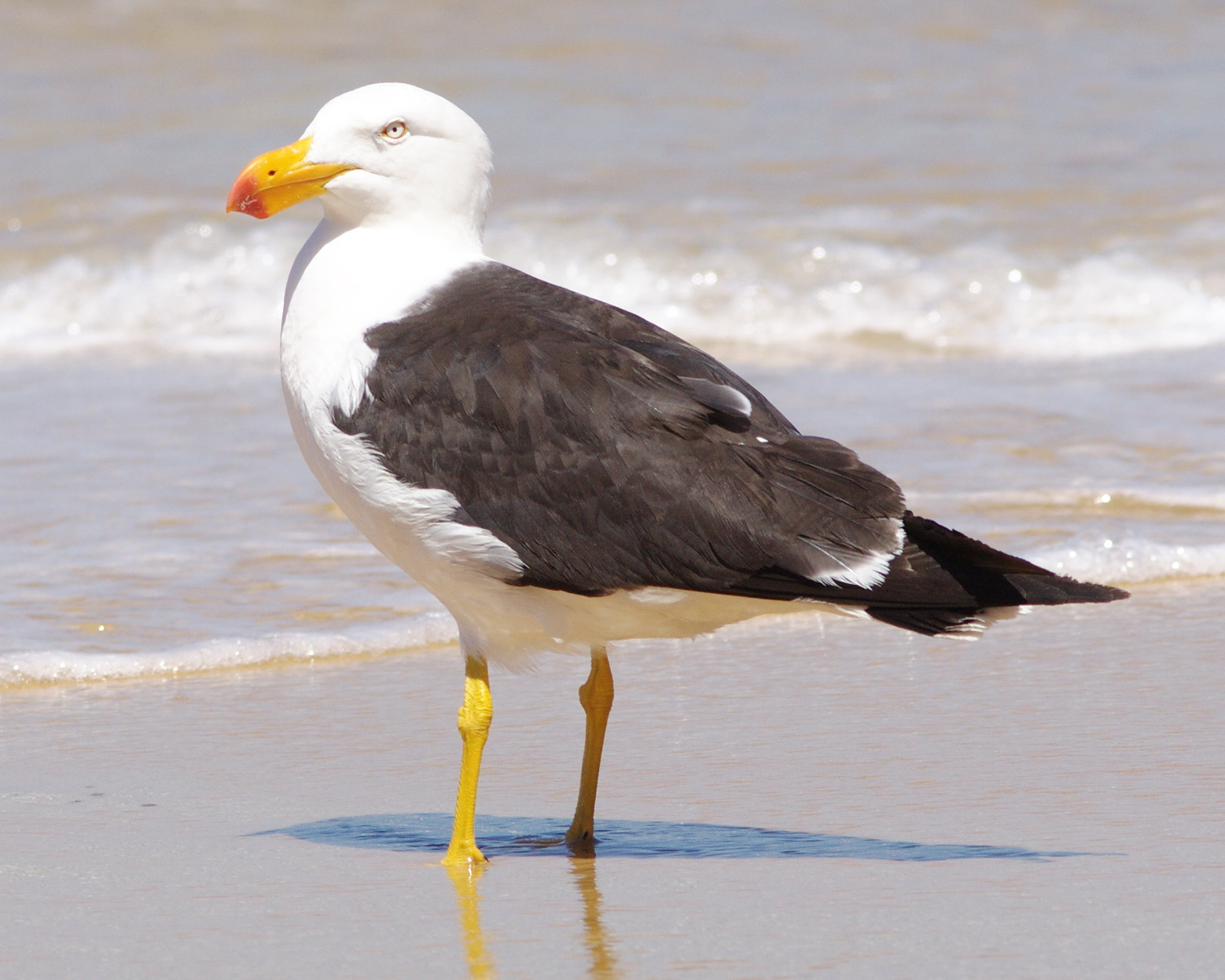
Pacific gulls nest on the island

Recorded breeding seabird species are the little penguin and Pacific gull. The Cape Barren goose has also nested on the island.

== See also ==
- List of islands of Tasmania
