= Outer Sister Island =

Island in Tasmania, Australia

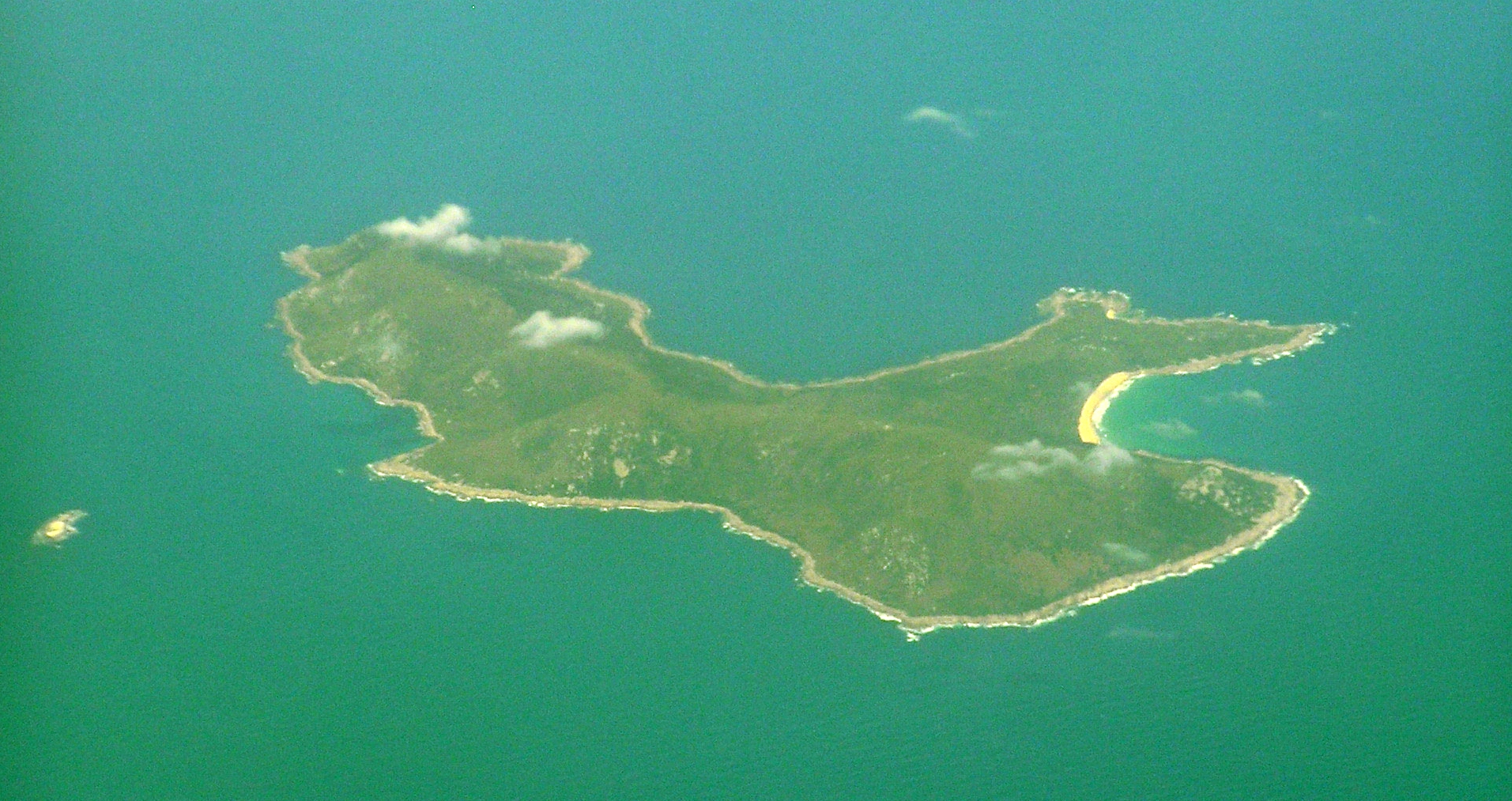
- View of Outer Sister Island, looking west

- Location within Tasmania

Geography
- Location: Bass Strait
- Coordinates: 39°39′S 147°59′E
- Archipelago: Furneaux Group
- Area: 5.45 km^{2} (2.10 sq mi)

Administration
- Australia
- State: Tasmania

Outer Sister Island, part of the Sister Islands Conservation Area, is a granite and dolerite island, with an area of 545 hectares (2.10 mi^{2}), located in Bass Strait, Tasmania, Australia.

== Location and features ==
The Outer Sister Island is located north of Flinders Island in the Furneaux Group. The island is grazed by sheep and annual muttonbirding takes place.

Seabirds and waders recorded as breeding on the island include little penguin, short-tailed shearwater, silver gull, Pacific gull and sooty oystercatcher. Resident reptiles are the metallic skink, White's skink, white-lipped snake, lowland copperhead and tiger snake. Apart from the sheep, mammals present on the island include the Tasmanian pademelon and the introduced house mouse, as well as feral cats.

== See also ==
- List of islands of Tasmania
- Inner Sister Island
- Shag Reef
