= Waterhouse Island (Tasmania) =

Island in Tasmania, Australia

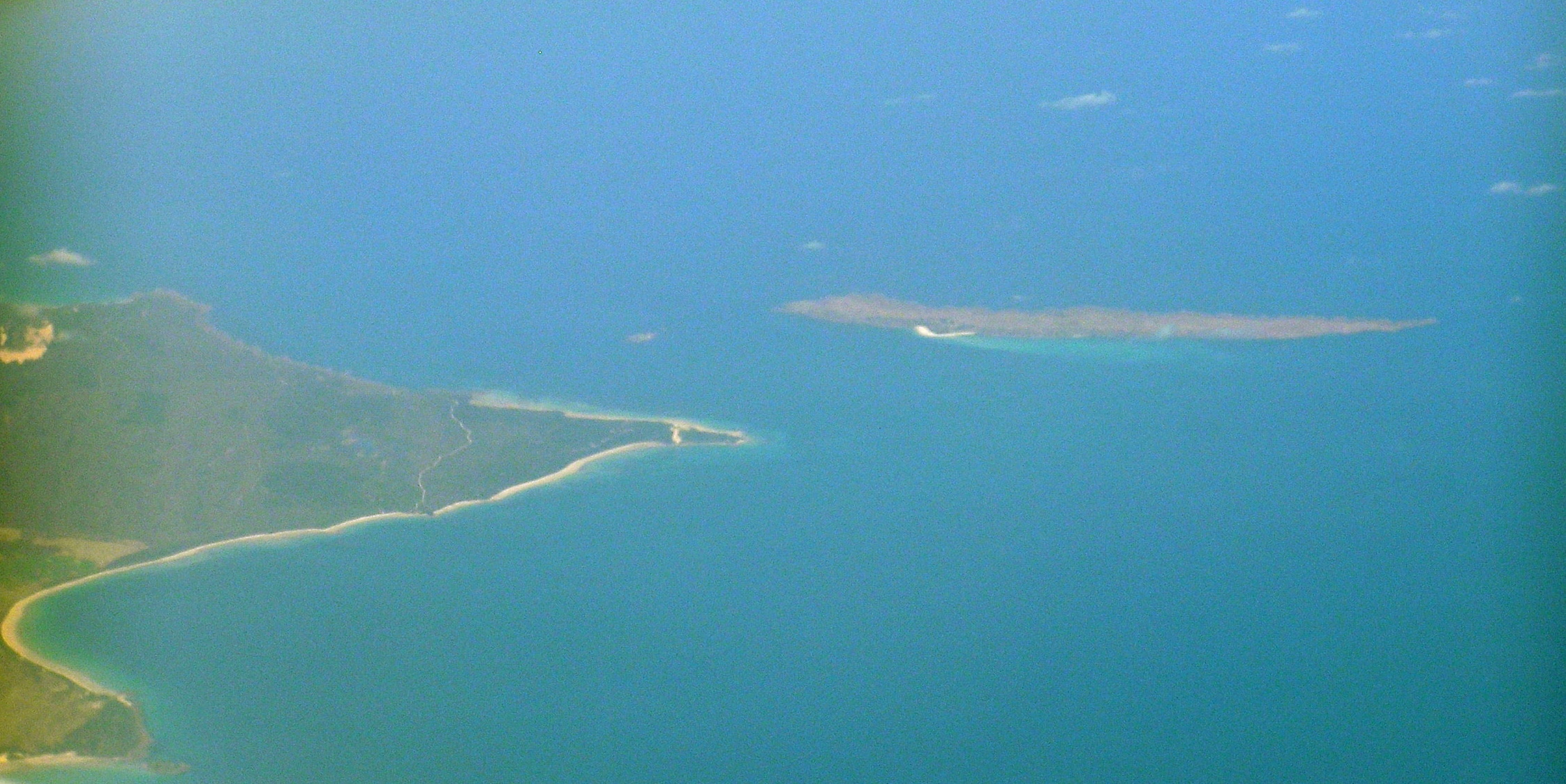
- Waterhouse Island is on the right side of Waterhouse Point.

- Location within Tasmania
- Etymology: Captain Henry Waterhouse

Geography
- Location: Banks Strait, Bass Strait
- Coordinates: 40°48′S 147°37′E
- Archipelago: Waterhouse Island Group
- Total islands: 12
- Area: 287 ha (710 acres)

Administration
- Australia
- State: Tasmania

Waterhouse Island, part of the Waterhouse Island Group, is a 287-hectare (710-acre) granite island situated in Banks Strait, part of Bass Strait, lying close to the north-eastern coast of Tasmania, Australia.

The Waterhouse Island Group includes the Waterhouse, Little Waterhouse, Swan, Little Swan, Cygnet, Foster, St Helens, Ninth, Tenth, Paddys, Maclean, and Baynes islands and the Bird Rock, and George Rocks islets with their associated reefs.

== Location and features ==
The large inland portion of Waterhouse Island is privately owned under freehold tenure. On 28 September 2011, 107 hectares (260 acres) of the island was proclaimed as the Waterhouse Island Conservation Area. This conservation area surrounds almost all of the island from the low-water mark to approximately 45 metres (148 ft) inshore, as well as a 35-hectare (86-acre) region at the northern tip. A small sandy spit on the eastern coastline does not appear to be encapsulated by this conservation area and the tenure of this sandy spit remains uncertain. A lighthouse is located on 266 square metres (2,860 sq ft) of crown land at the northern point of the island.

Waterhouse Island has an equable Mediterranean climate with warm summers and cooler winters. Rainfall, averaging approximately 600 millimetres (24 in) per annum, is relatively evenly spread throughout the year, however with a bias to late winter months.

Waterhouse Island has extensive white sand beaches on the eastern and south eastern shores. West and northern coasts are primarily rocky. The island is used as a haven for sheltering yachts and other small boats as they travel through Bass Strait. Surrounding waters are popular for fishing, both finfish and various shellfish.

== History and use ==
Northeastern Tasmanian was spoken on Waterhouse Island by Tasmanian Aborigines but became extinct during the 19th century.

Sealing is known to have taken place here from at least 1802.

For the past 150 years the island has mostly been farmed, with sheep grazing the most prominent pursuit. The island has a house and a cottage, a four stand wool shed and implement shed, and a machine shed. The two dwellings are located in the lee of the prevailing westerly winds, on the eastern side, above sandy beaches. The island has a working wharf and two airstrips, one east–west and the other intersecting it. Freight boats, including Bass Strait trading vessels, also can beach on protected East and southeast sand beaches. Until the 1970s, grazing activity led to some degradation of vegetation. The present owners, who have had it since that time, have fenced off vulnerable areas and have undertaken an extensive revegetation program. The grazing land vegetation primarily consists of introduced pasture grasses. Livestock grazing had previously caused erosion which had affected the shearwater colonies. These are now stabilised and the fairy penguin and the shearwater rookeries are thriving.

== Etymology ==
The island is named after Captain Henry Waterhouse of the Reliance. Nicholas Baudin stopped at the island in 1802 mistakenly thinking the name meant fresh water could be found there, which was not the case.

== Fauna ==
Recorded breeding seabird species are the little penguin and short-tailed shearwater. Introduced mammals include sheep, cats, fallow deer and house mice. Reptiles present include the metallic skink, spotted skink, three-lined skink, Bougainville's skink, White's skink and tiger snake.

== See also ==
- List of islands of Tasmania
