= Three Sisters Islands =

Three Sisters Islands may refer to:

- Three Sisters (District of Columbia), United States
- Three Sisters Islands (New York), United States
- Olu Malau Islands, Solomon Islands

== See also ==
- Three Sisters (disambiguation)
- Sisters Islands (disambiguation)
