= Inner Sister Island =

Island in Tasmania, Australia

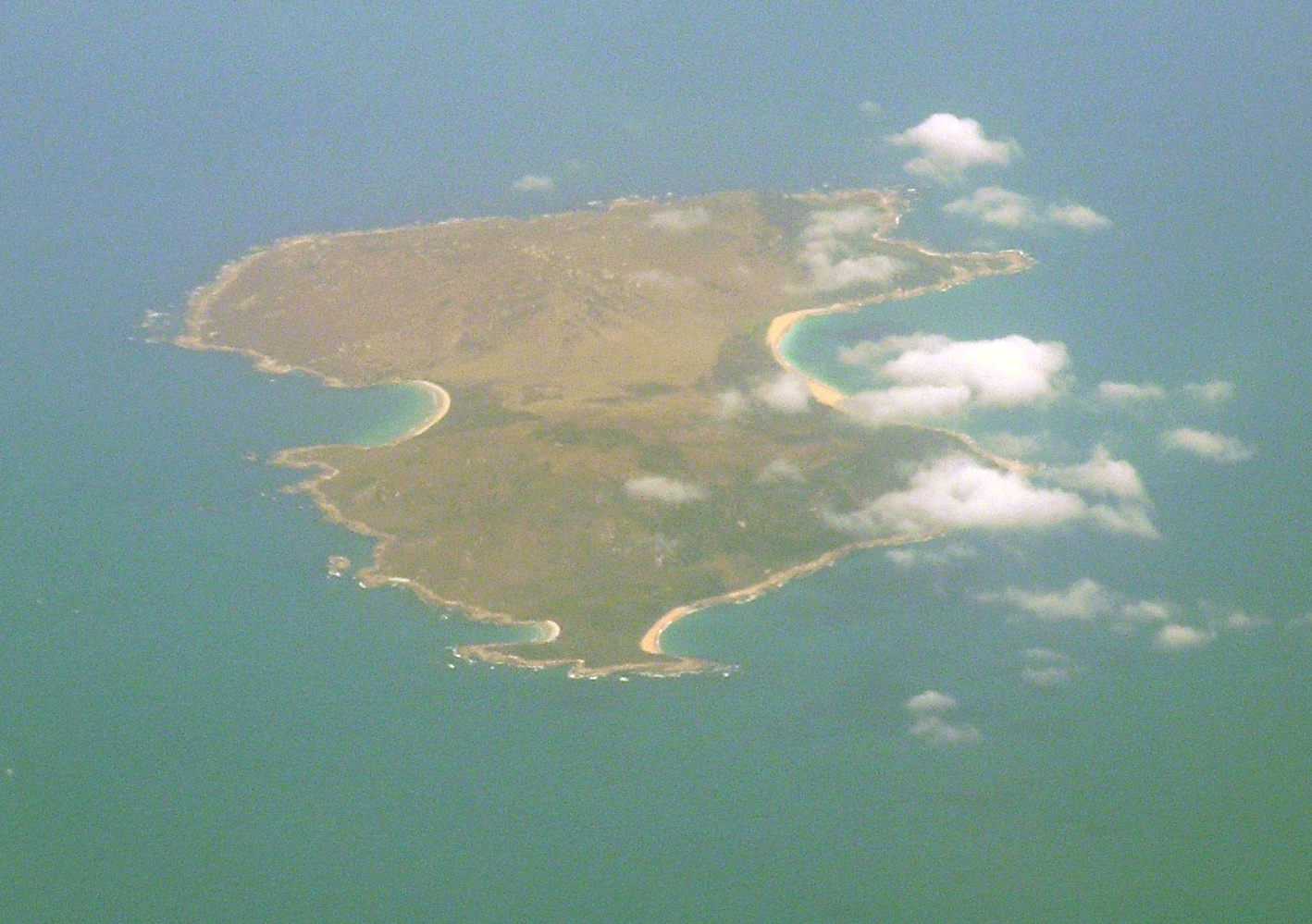
- View of Inner Sister Island, looking west

- Location within Tasmania

Geography
- Location: Bass Strait
- Coordinates: 39°41′S 147°55′E
- Archipelago: Furneaux Group
- Area: 748 ha (1,850 acres)

Administration
- Australia
- State: Tasmania

Inner Sister Island, part of the Sister Islands Conservation Area, is a granite and dolerite island, with an area of 748 hectares (2.89 mi^{2}), located in Bass Strait, Tasmania, Australia.

== Location and features ==
The Inner Sister Island is located north of Flinders Island in the Furneaux Group. The island is grazed by sheep and annual muttonbirding takes place.

Seabirds and waders recorded as breeding on the island include little penguin, short-tailed shearwater, silver gull, Pacific gull, pied oystercatcher and sooty oystercatcher. Resident reptiles are the three-lined skink, White's skink, white-lipped snake and tiger snake. Apart from the sheep, mammals present on the island include the eastern barred bandicoot, Tasmanian pademelon and the introduced European hare.

== See also ==
- List of islands of Tasmania
- Outer Sister Island
- Shag Reef
