= Sister Islands Conservation Area =

- IUCN category VI (protected area with sustainable use of natural resources)
- Location within Tasmania
- Location: Tasmania
- Nearest city: Yarram in Victoria
- Coordinates: 39°40′30″S 147°57′10″E
- Area: 1,200 ha (4.6 sq mi)

The Sister Islands Conservation Area, commonly called the Sisters Island Group, is a conservation area of approximately 1,200 hectares (3,000 acres) that comprises a group of three islands in Bass Strait, Tasmania, Australia.

== Features and location ==
The three islands within the conservation area that is located north of Flinders Island in the Furneaux Group, are the:

- Inner Sister Island, located at 39°41′42″S 147°55′1″E
- Outer Sister Island, located at 39°39′14″S 147°59′31″E
- Shag Reef, located at 39°40′19″S 147°59′42″E

== See also ==
- Kent Group National Park
