= Henry Waterhouse =

Royal Navy officer (1770–1812)

Captain Henry Waterhouse
- Born: 13 December 1770; Westminster, London, England
- Died: 27 July 1812 (aged 41); Westminster, London, England
- Burial place: St John's, Westminster
- Relatives: George Bass (brother-in-law)
- Military career
- Branch: Royal Navy
- Rank: Captain
- Commands: HMS Reliance

Captain Henry Waterhouse (13 December 1770 – 27 July 1812) was an English naval officer of the Royal Navy who became an early settler in the Colony of New South Wales, Australia. He imported to Australia the continent's first Spanish merino sheep, whose wool became one of the colony's best exports.

== Early life ==
Henry Waterhouse was the eldest son born to William and Susanna Waterhouse (née. Brewer) at Westminster, London, England, on 13 December 1770. William was a page to Prince Henry, Duke of Cumberland and Strathearn. Henry was named after the Prince, who was also named as his godfather.

In 1782, William secured his son a position in the Royal Navy with Captain James Luttrell, under whom Henry served on HMS Portland, HMS Mediator and HMS Ganges.

== New South Wales ==
In 1786, Waterhouse joined HMS Sirius as a midshipman after Cumberland House recommended him to Governor Arthur Phillip. Waterhouse sailed to Australia with the First Fleet and helped establish the settlement at Sydney Cove. On 2 October 1788, Sirius was sent to pick up supplies from Cape of Good Hope, completing a circumnavigation on its return in March 1789. When the ship's third Lieutenant George Maxwell's behaviour became increasingly erratic and bizarre, he was discharged and Waterhouse was promoted to acting third Lieutenant.

Waterhouse was a member of the crew when Sirius was wrecked off Norfolk Island. He returned to Sydney Cove on HMS Supply to become an aide to Governor Phillip. Waterhouse was present at the whale feast with Indigenous people at Manly Cove; after Phillip was speared in the shoulder, Waterhouse snapped off the shaft and helped the Governor return to the boats. In 1791, Waterhouse returned to England with the rest of the crew of the Sirius on the Waaksamheyd.

== French Revolution ==
With the rest of Sirius crew, Waterhouse was acquitted at court-martial for the loss of the ship and, with a letter of recommendation from Governor Phillip, Waterhouse's promotion to Lieutenant was confirmed July 1792. He was posted to HMS Swallow in 1792, was transferred to HMS Bellerophon in 1793 and served in the battle of the Glorious First of June in 1794.

== Return to New South Wales ==
In 1794, former Captain of Sirius John Hunter was appointed the new Governor of New South Wales. Hunter requested Waterhouse to be commander of one of the colony's new ships so on 25 July 1794, Waterhouse was promoted to commander of HMS Reliance. In February 1795, Reliance sailed with the new Governor aboard, arriving in Sydney on 7 September 1795.

Waterhouse sailed to the Cape Colony in 1796 to procure livestock for New South Wales and returned to Australia with the colony's first merino sheep. He subsequently made several voyages to Norfolk Island and in 1800 was the first person to chart the Antipodes Islands.

== Later life ==
In 1800, Waterhouse returned to Britain and was promoted to Captain on 25 October that year. He lived most of the rest of his life near Rochester, Kent. Waterhouse died at his father's home in Smith Street, Westminster, and was buried on 5 August 1812 at St John the Evangelist. He is commemorated in the name of Waterhouse Island in north-eastern Tasmania.

== Family ==
Waterhouse was witness to his sister Elizabeth's (born 14 June 1768) marriage to his friend and associate, naval surgeon George Bass. Waterhouse never married but had an illegitimate daughter Maria Waterhouse (1791–1875), who was born in Sydney to convict Elizabeth Barnes (1767–1794). With the death of Barnes and his return to New South Wales, Waterhouse arranged for Maria to be sent to live with his father in London. She was taken to England by the Lieutenant Governor William Paterson and his wife.

== See also ==
- Journals of the First Fleet
