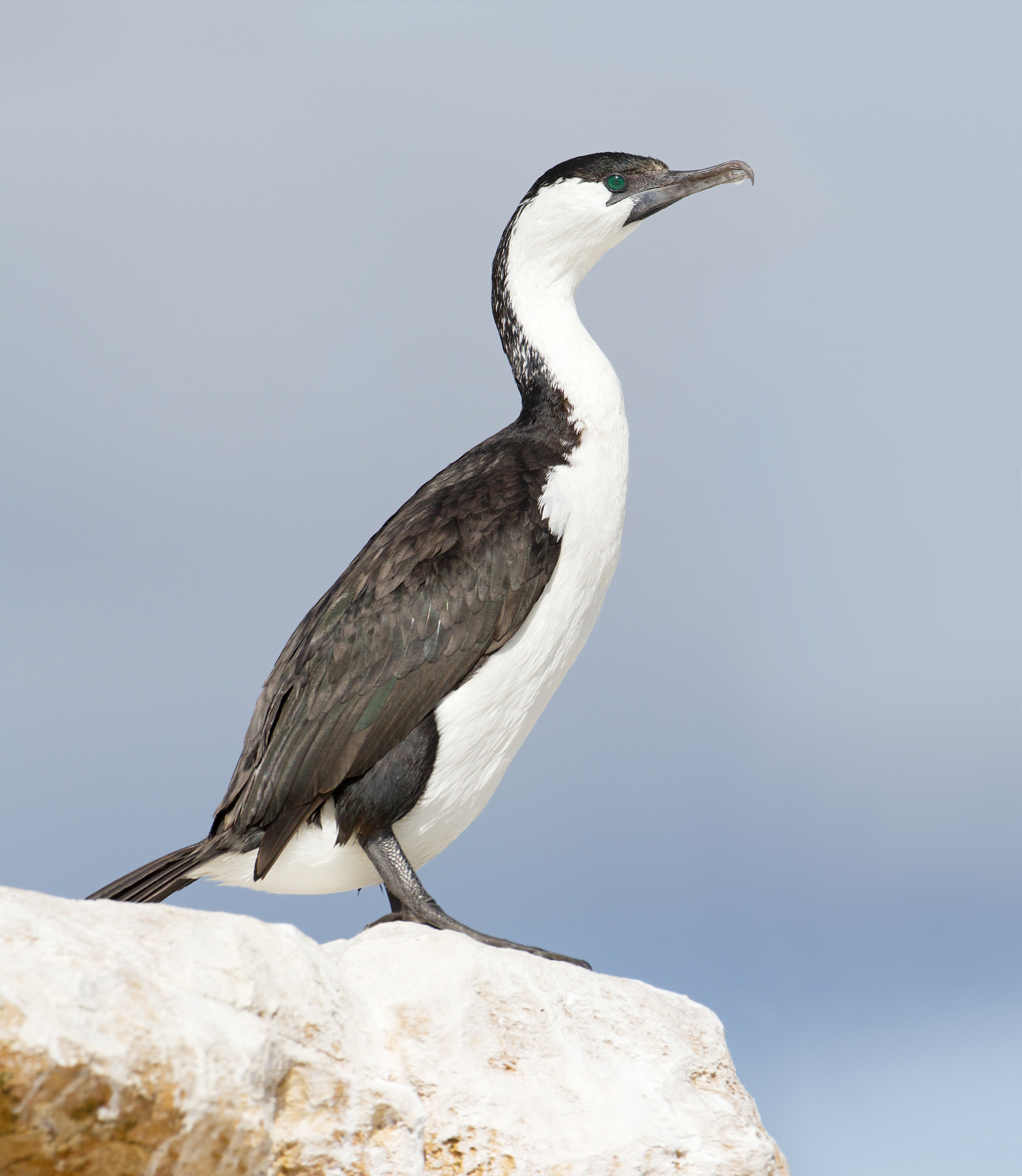

Conservation status
- Least Concern (IUCN 3.1)

Scientific classification
- Kingdom: Animalia
- Phylum: Chordata
- Class: Aves
- Order: Suliformes
- Family: Phalacrocoracidae
- Genus: Phalacrocorax
- Species: P. fuscescens

Binomial name
- Phalacrocorax fuscescens (Vieillot, 1817)
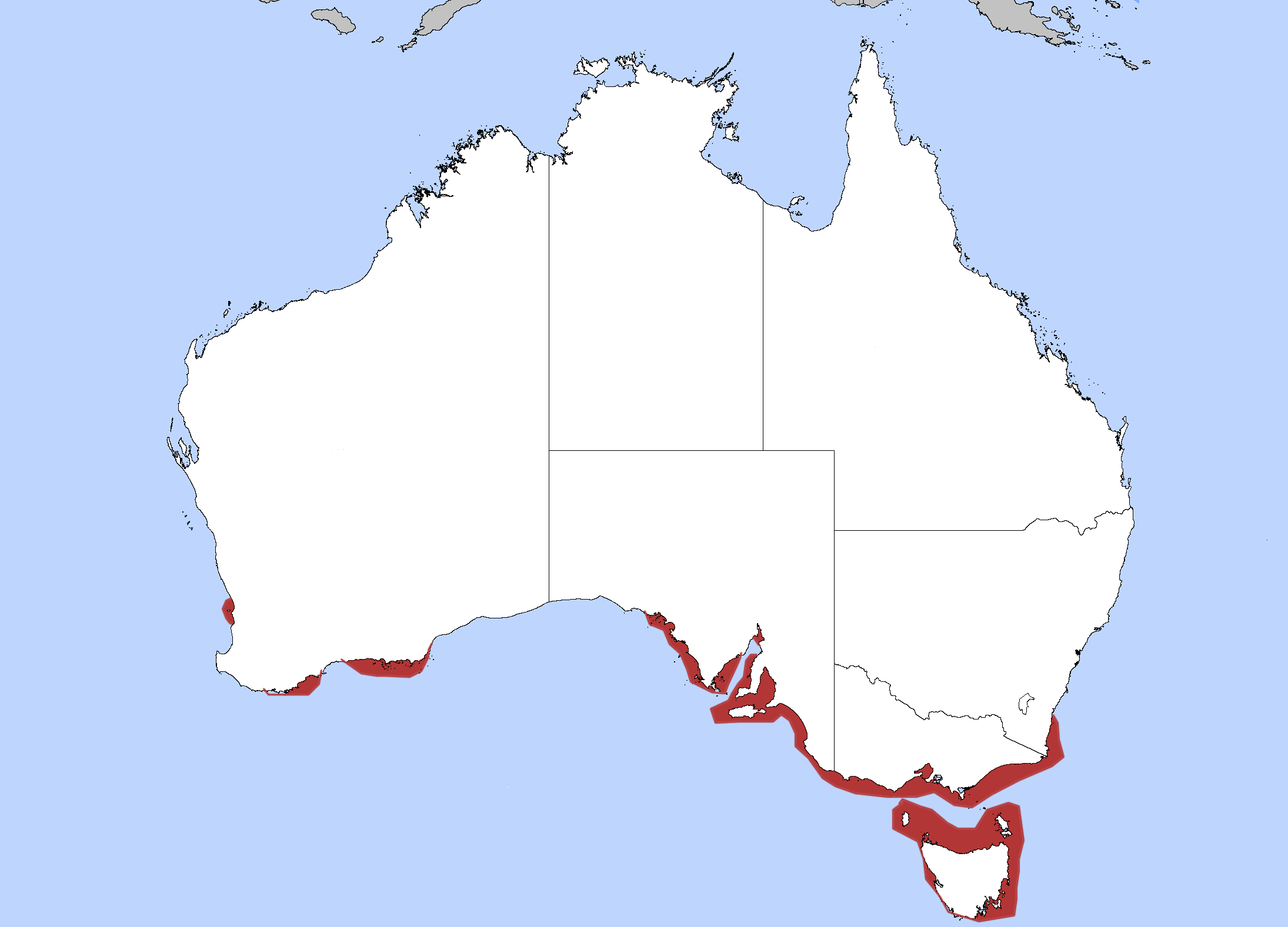
- Distribution of the black-faced cormorant

Synonyms
- Stictocarbo fuscescens

= Black-faced cormorant =

Species of bird

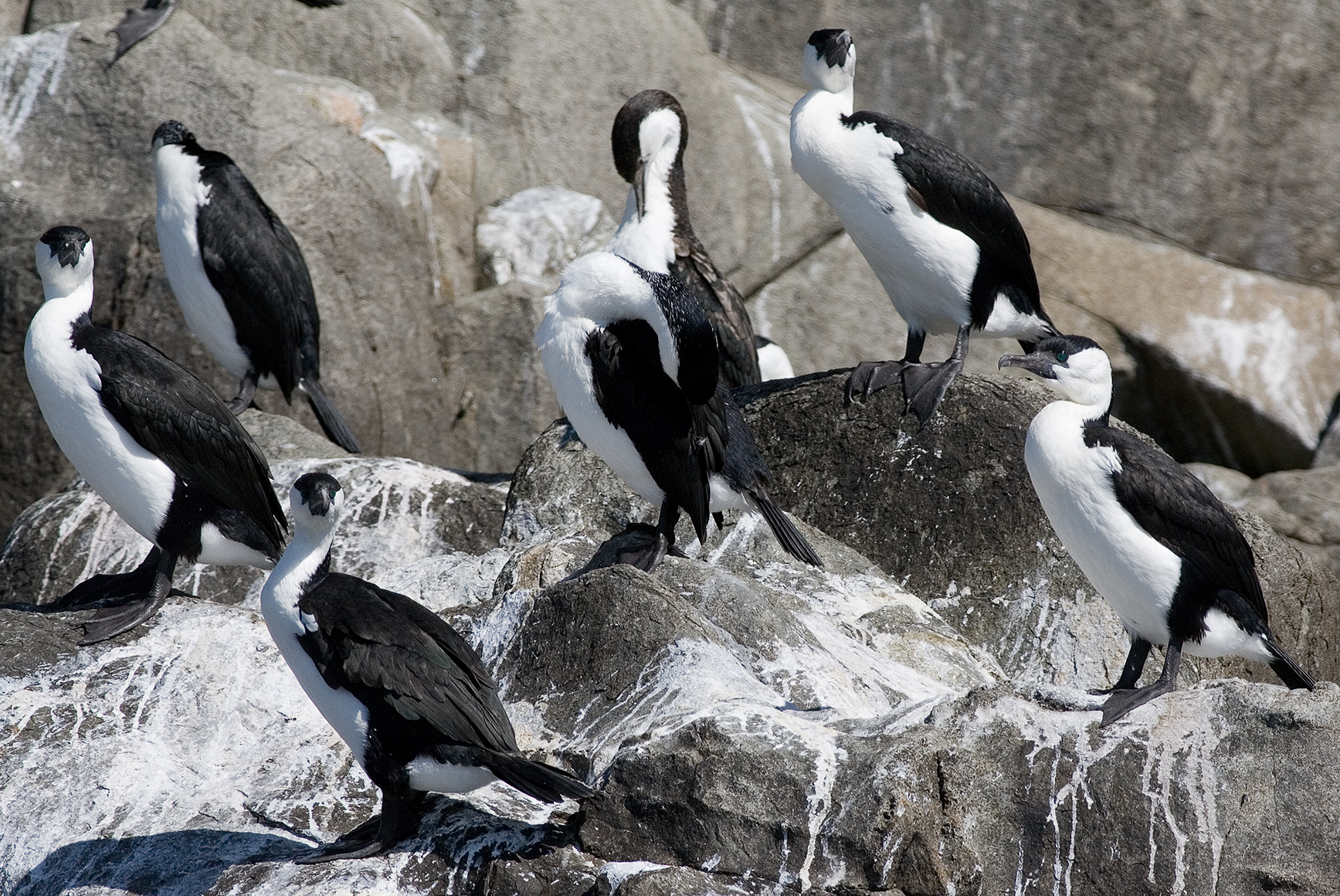
Roosting, Bruny Island

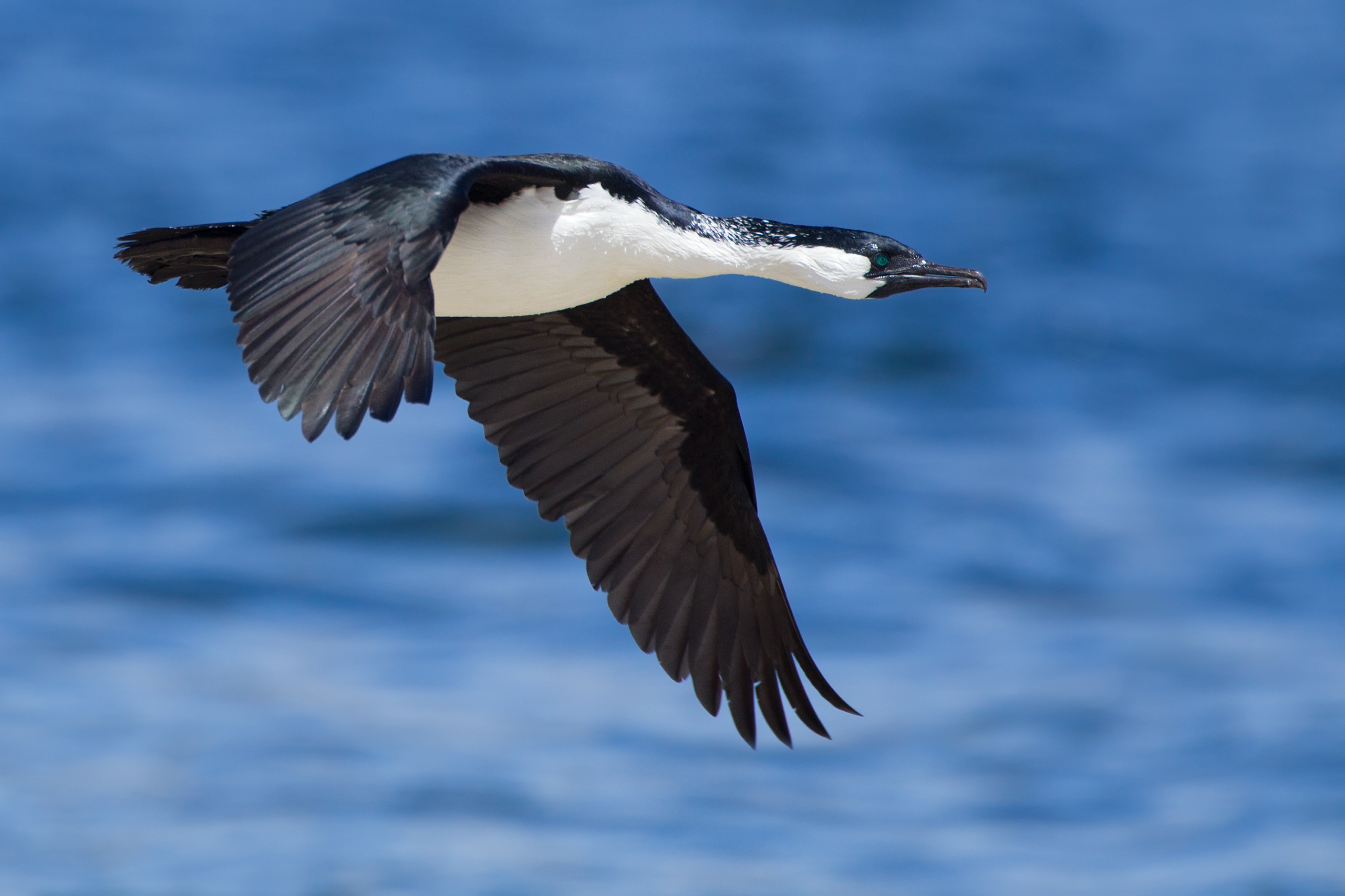
In flight

The black-faced cormorant (Phalacrocorax fuscescens), also known as the black-faced shag, is a medium-sized member of the cormorant family. Upperparts, including facial skin and bill, are black, with white underparts. It is endemic to coastal regions of southern Australia.

== Description ==
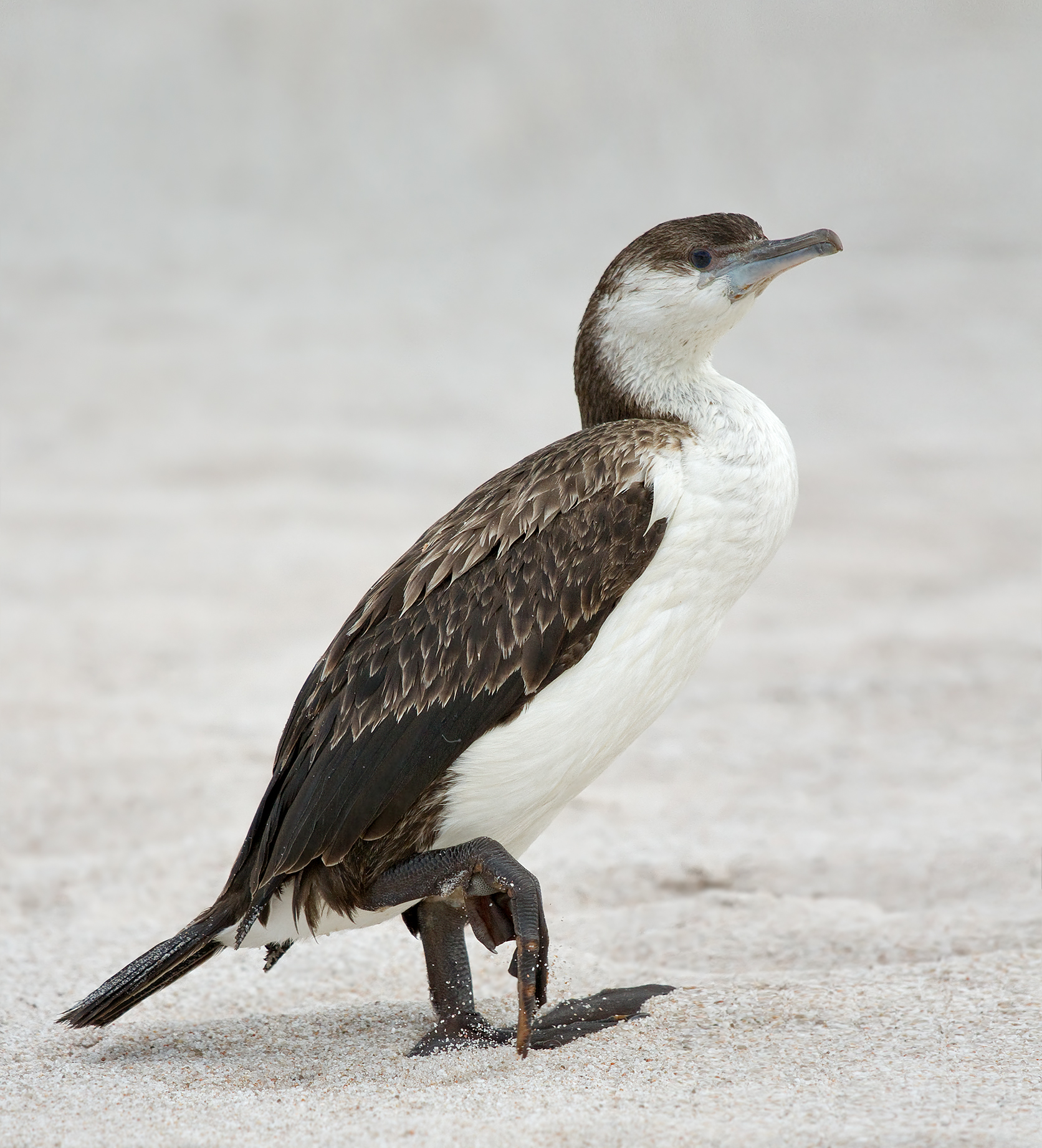
A black-faced cormorant with juvenile plummage.

Like other cormorant species, the black-faced cormorant is a large aquatic bird, with a long hooked bill, webbed feet, and monochromatic plumage. This is one of the largest cormorants found in south-western Australia and has pied plumage with the upper half of its body black and the undersides white. Its face is naked and black, hence the "black-faced" name, and the tail, feet, and thighs are also black. The back feathers are glossy, and its bill is dark grey with a prominent hook at the tip. It has blue-green eyes. When flying, it holds its head level or lower than its body and holds its wings in a cross-shape like most cormorants.

Species that are similar in appearance include the pied cormorant (slightly larger) and the little pied cormorant (slightly smaller).

=== Plumages ===
The breeding and non-breeding plumages are very similar, with the formation of fine white streaks along the neck during breeding until eggs are laid. Juveniles have dark-brown upper feathers, including dark ear coverts and a dark face, with a lighter underside streaked with brown. Following the Juvenile plumage, black-faced cormorants have immature plumage which are similar to adult plumage.

=== Sexual Dimorphism ===
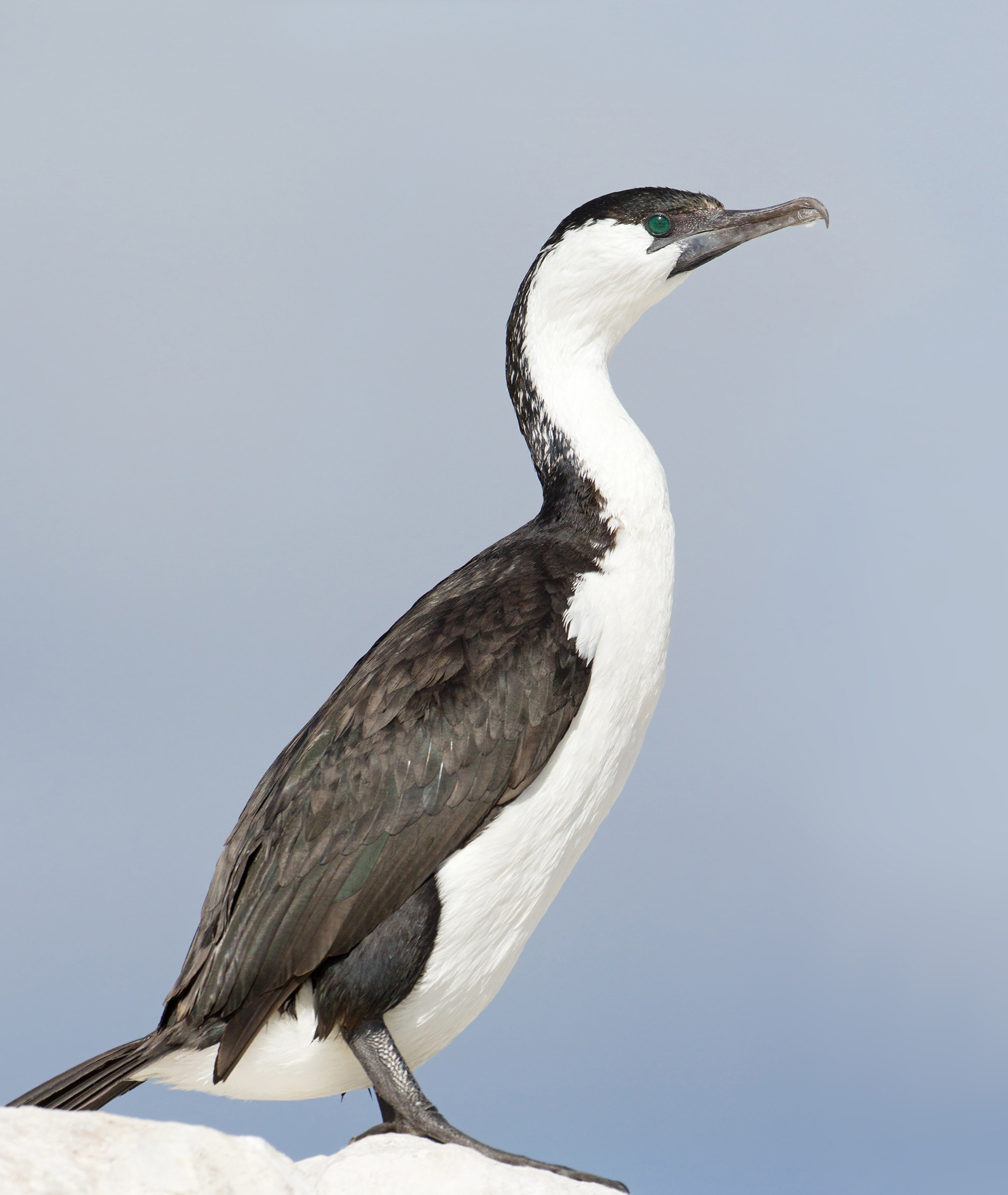
Black-faced cormorant in breeding plumage with fine white streaking on the back of the neck.

Black-faced cormorants have very subtle sexual dimorphism, making it difficult to differentiate sexes in the field. In general, males are larger and more robust than females, who are more slender in comparison. Males also have larger bills than females, with male bills measuring greater than 77 millimeters and female bills less than 76 mm.

=== Vocalization ===
Black-faced cormorants are usually silent when away from the breeding colony. However, when they are at their nests, the male will emit a loud honk or guttural croak, and the female will hiss when approached.

== Taxonomy ==
The black-faced cormorant is one of around 40 species in the cormorant and shag family Phalacrocoracidae. This family split off from the darter family Anhingadae over 40 million years ago, so it has a relatively independent evolutionary history. Of the suggested 7 genera in the cormorant family, the black-faced cormorant is part of the Old-Word cormorants Phalacrocorax. This genus diverged from its sister genus, the North-Pacific Cormorants Urile around 10 million years ago.

The closest related species to the black-faced cormorant is the pied cormorant P. varius.

== Habitat and Distribution ==
Black-faced cormorants are endemic to the coastal regions of southern Australia and Tasmania. The population is estimated to in the tens of thousands, and is distributed across Western Australia, South Australia, Victoria and Tasmania, particularly in the Bass Strait and Spencer Gulf. There are two independent populations: one on the southern coast of Western Australia, and the other on the coasts of Southern Australia, Victoria and Tasmania.

=== Habitat ===
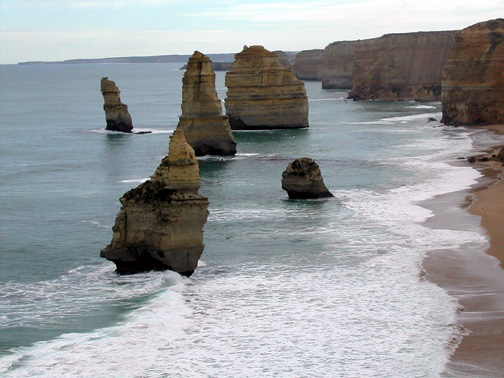
Rocky cliffs on the southern coast of Australia.

Unlike the other cormorants found around the Australian continent, the habitat of the black-faced cormorant is exclusively coastal and marine. They can be found in coastal waters, inlets, rocky shores, and offshore islands. Occasionally black-faced cormorants can be found in estuaries of rivers. Colonies are usually found on steep cliffs and rocky islands where they nest. In the winter, black-faced cormorants leave coastal waters to breed in these colonies.

== Behaviour and Ecology ==
Because the black-faced cormorant is an exclusively marine bird, its behaviours enable it to be well-adapted to its environment. It uses pursuit-diving to capture fish, and nests high on cliffs to avoid predators.

=== Diet ===
The black-faced cormorant eats fish almost exclusively. Its diet generally consists of benthic or demersal fish, as well as some cephalopods, and varies between breeding and non-breeding seasons. It forages along the coast and at the mouths of rivers, and will dive up to 12 m to catch its prey. After diving, the black-faced cormorant will spread its wings to dry its feathers in the sun. Black-faced cormorants will occasionally forage together in flocks. While breeding, its preferred prey items are wrasse and silver trevally. After the breeding season, silverbelly, wrasse, whiting and hardyheads are consumed most frequently. Prey is consumed whole, and non-digestible parts are regurgitated in pellets.

=== Reproduction ===
Breeding cormorants nest in pairs or breeding colonies on islands or cliffs. They are likely monogamous like other cormorant species. Nesting sites are on bare rocks, often close to water, and are solidly built of driftwood, seaweed, and other plants with a 35–45 cm diameter. 2 to 3 elongated oval eggs are then laid. The eggs are pale blue-green and measure 58 x 36 mm.

The breeding season for black-faced cormorants varies between populations, and has been observed to occur anywhere from June to February. In the Bass Strait, the black-faced cormorant breeds from June to September, with a peak laying date around the end of July. The reason for this may be to avoid hot summer temperatures that can affect chicks. However, colonies in western and southern Australia breed later in the year, from September to February.

== Threats ==
Black-faced cormorants are considered 'Least Concern' by the IUCN, due to their large range and populations. In Australia, they are considered 'Secure' federally as well as in South Australia, Western Australia, and Tasmania. However, in Victoria, the black-faced cormorant is considered 'Vulnerable'. Breeding colonies are very sensitive to human presences, so it is important that important breeding habitats are protected from disruption.

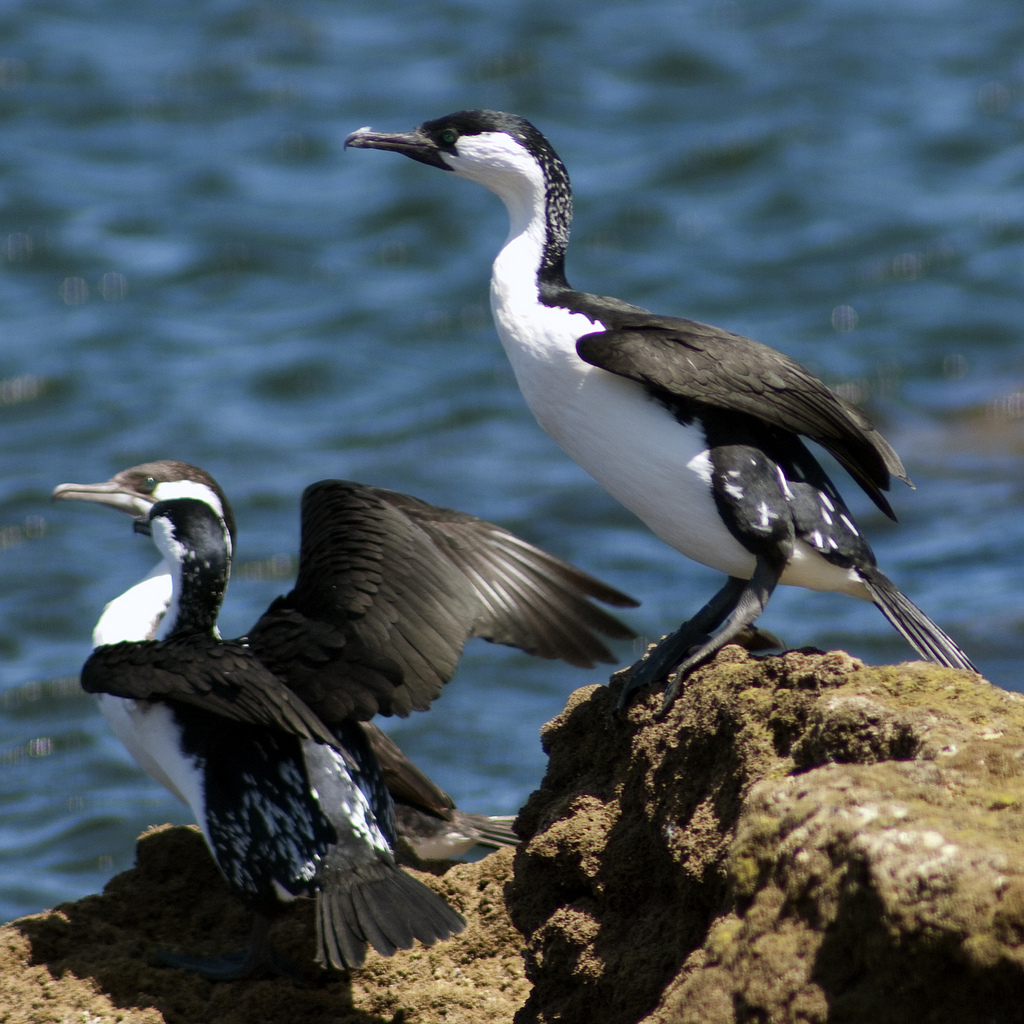
Black-faced cormorants holding wings out to dry their feathers after diving.
