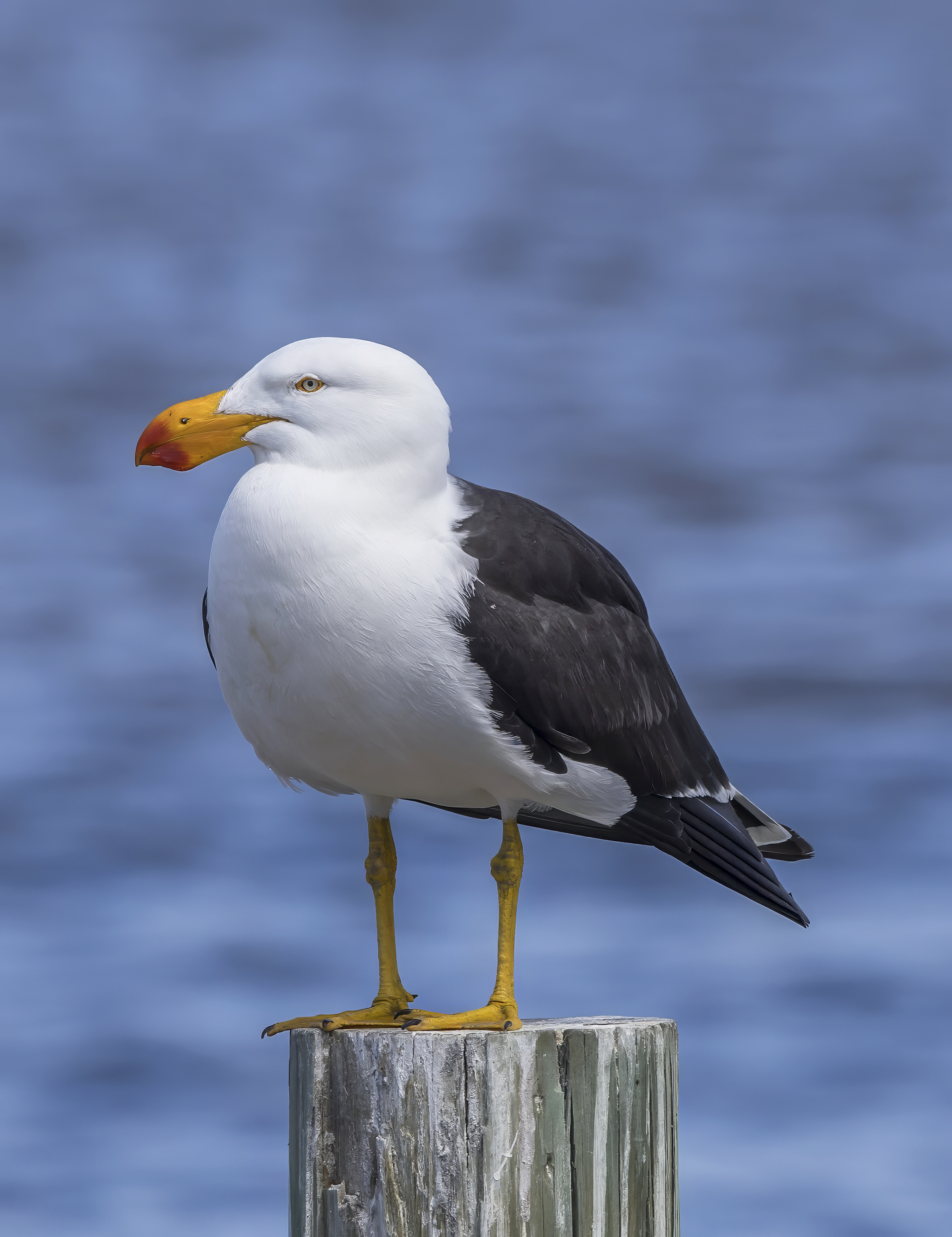
- L. p. pacificus, Freycinet Peninsula, Tasmania, Australia

Conservation status
- Least Concern (IUCN 3.1)

Scientific classification
- Kingdom: Animalia
- Phylum: Chordata
- Class: Aves
- Order: Charadriiformes
- Family: Laridae
- Genus: Larus
- Species: L. pacificus

Binomial name
- Larus pacificus Latham, 1801

Subspecies
- L. p. pacificus Latham, 1801; L. p. georgis King, 1826

= Pacific gull =

Species of bird

The Pacific gull (Larus pacificus) is a gull, native to the coasts of Australia. It is moderately common in a band along the coast between Carnarvon, Western Australia, in the west, and Sydney in the east, as well as Tasmania and other islands off the continent's southern coast. It has, however, become scarce in some parts of the south-east, as a result of competition from the kelp gull.

Much larger than the ubiquitous silver gull, and much less common, Pacific gulls are usually seen alone or in pairs, loafing around the shoreline, steadily patrolling high above the edge of the water, or sometimes flying high on the breeze to drop a shellfish or sea urchin onto rocks.

== Diet ==
The gulls' diet consists of a number of various fish species and invertebrates. They frequently consume crabs, most often the species Ovalipes australiensis and Paragrapsus gaimardii. They also commonly eat Platycephalus bassensis (sand flatheads) and cephalopods, both of which are sourced from their regular consumption of waste from fish which have been cleaned on wharves and beaches. Additionally, they may eat insects, eggs, and other seabirds.

The gulls may be found scavenging abattoirs and in rubbish tips, where they will often steal food from other birds.

== Taxonomy ==
The Pacific gull was first described by English ornithologist John Latham in 1801 from a Thomas Watling drawing, where the local name had been recorded as Troo-gad-dill. Its specific epithet refers to the Pacific Ocean.

Two subspecies are recognised:

Image	Subspecies	Distribution
	L. p. pacificus Latham, 1801	from the south-east coast and Tasmania
	L. p. georgii King, 1826	South Australia and Western Australia

== Description ==
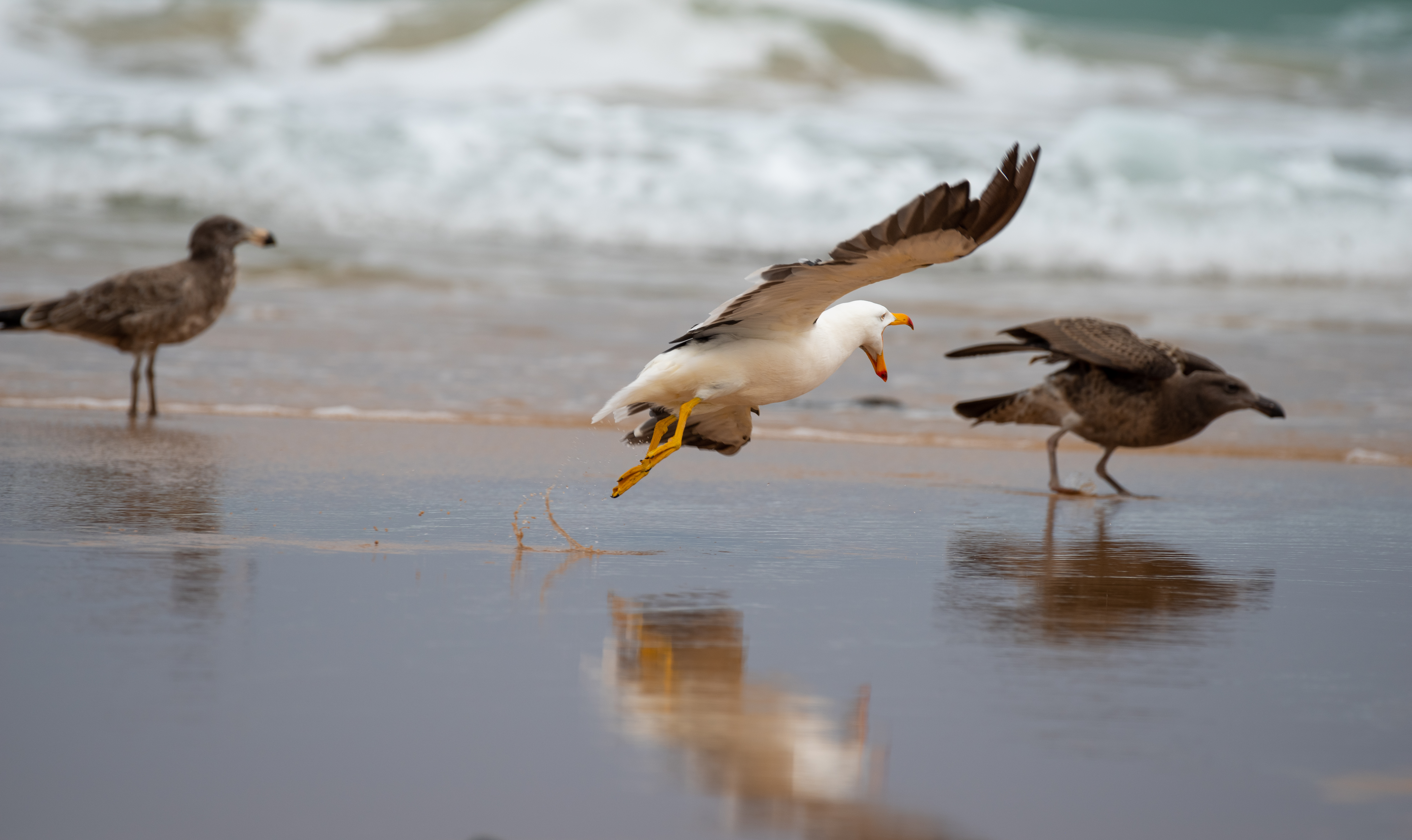
Adult and juveniles, Cape Woolamai, Victoria

Pacific gulls are the only large gulls in their range, besides the occasional kelp gull. This species can range in length from 58 to 66 cm (23 to 26 in) and span 137 to 157 cm (54 to 62 in) across the wings. They typically weigh from 900 to 1,180 g (1.98 to 2.60 lb). This species is mostly white, with dark wings and back, and a very thick (when compared to other gull species), powerful, red-tipped yellow bill. They have salt glands that secrete salty water through the nostrils. Young birds are mottled-brown all over, and attain their adult plumage only gradually; by its fourth year, a young Pacific gull has usually become difficult to tell apart from an adult bird.

Of the two subspecies, the nominate eastern race prefers sheltered beaches, and the western race L. p. georgii is commonly found even on exposed shores. Both subspecies nest in pairs or loose colonies on offshore islands, making a cup of grasses and sticks in an exposed position, and laying two or three mottled brown eggs.

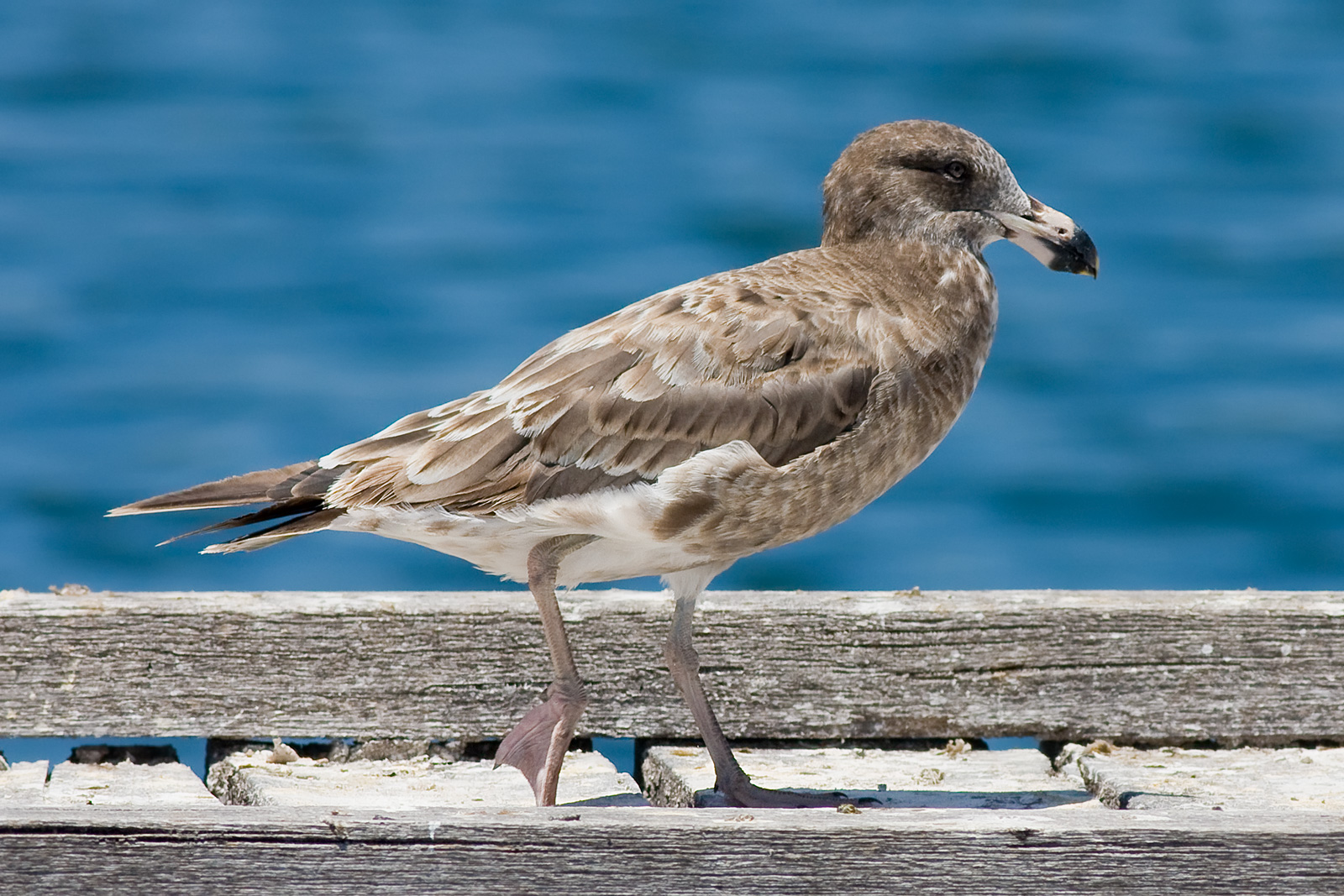
Juvenile

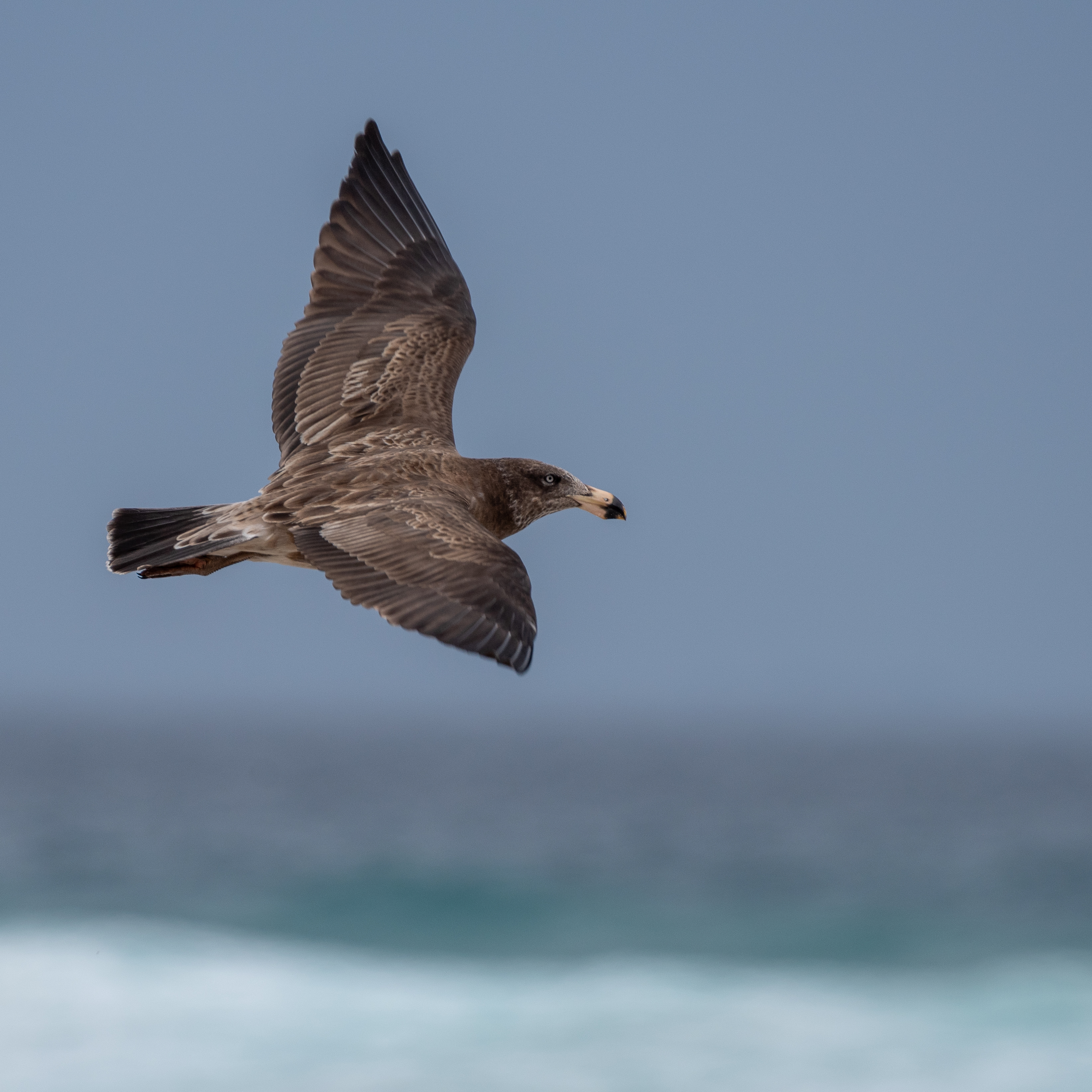
Juvenile, Cape Woolamai, Victoria

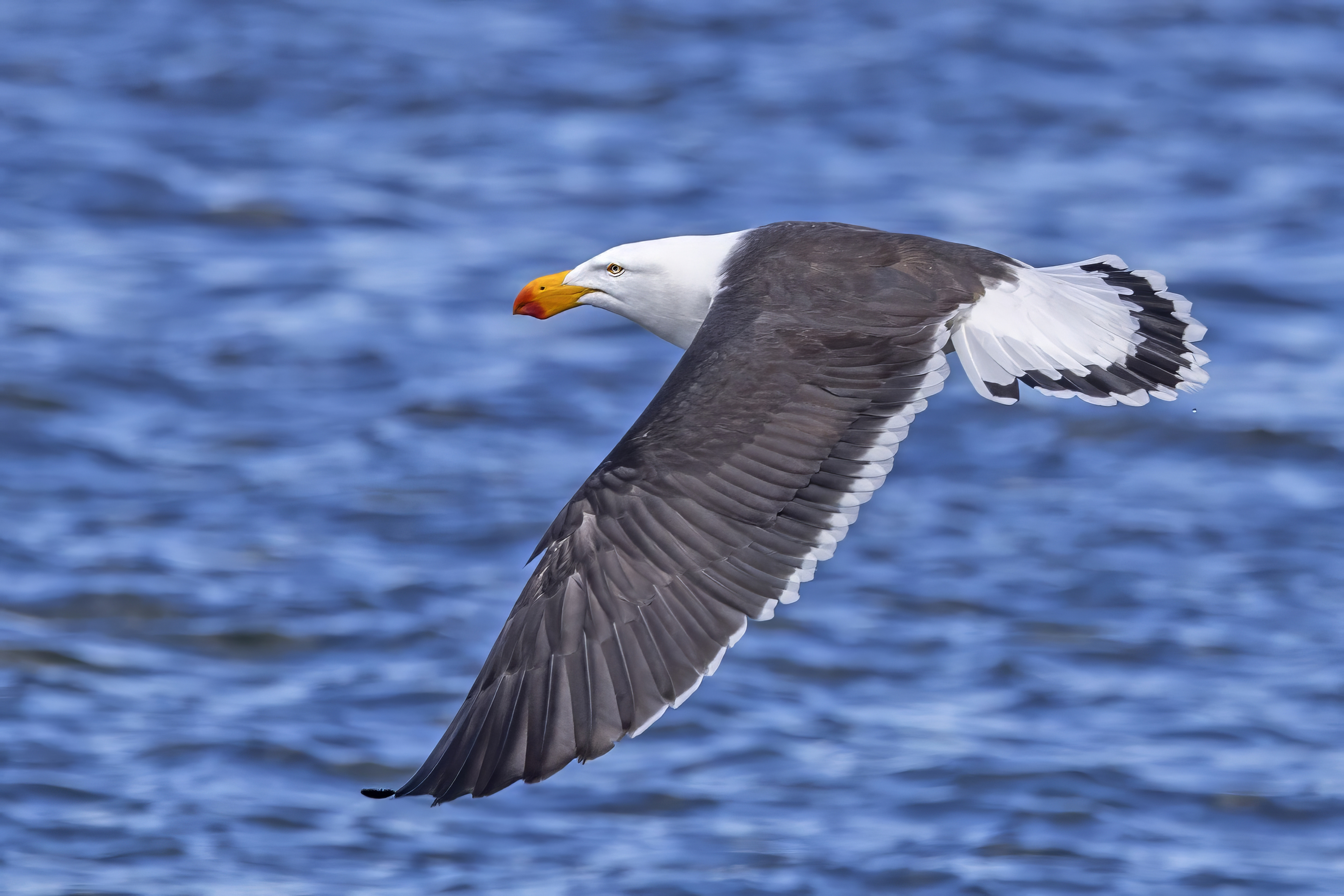
Adult, Freycinet, Tasmania
