= Puncheon =

Puncheon may refer to:

- Puncheon (barrel), a container for wine and/or spirits
- Puncheon or plank road, a road built with split logs or heavy slab timbers with one face smoothed, also used for flooring or other construction
- Puncheon rum, a type of Caribbean rum
- Puncheon (unit), a unit of volume

== People with the surname ==
- Jason Puncheon (born 1986), English footballer

== See also ==
- Puncheon Island, Tasmania, Australia
- Puncheon Islets, Tasmania, Australia
- Puncheon Run Connector, unnumbered limited access highway in Delaware, USA
