= Spences Reefs =

Islets in Tasmania, Australia

Coordinates: 40°13′S 148°14′E

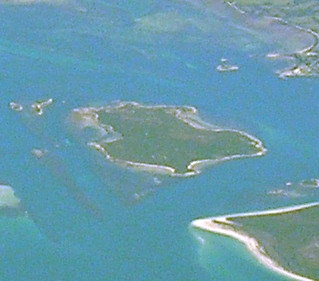
Spences Reefs appear to the top left of Little Green Island

Spences Reefs is a pair of reefs consisting of two islets, with a combined area of 0.65 ha, in Tasmania, Australia.

They are close to the south-east corner of Little Green Island and part of the Great Dog Island Group, lying in eastern Bass Strait between Flinders and Cape Barren Islands in the Furneaux Group. The islets are part of the Franklin Sound Islands Important Bird Area, identified as such by BirdLife International because it holds over 1% of the world populations of six bird species.

== Fauna ==
Recorded breeding seabird and wader species are little penguin, white-faced storm-petrel, sooty oystercatcher, pied oystercatcher and Caspian tern. Rats are present, with evidence that they prey on the storm-petrels.
