= Fisher Island Reef =

Small island in Tasmania, Australia

Coordinates: 40°13′S 148°14′E

Fisher Island Reef is a small granite island, with an area of 1,000 square metres, in south-eastern Australia. It is part of Tasmania’s Great Dog Island Group, lying in eastern Bass Strait between Flinders and Cape Barren Islands in the Furneaux Group, and is close to Fisher Island.

== Flora and fauna ==
The island is almost completely covered by the succulent round-leaf pigface. Recorded breeding seabird and wader species are Pacific gull, Caspian tern and sooty oystercatcher.
