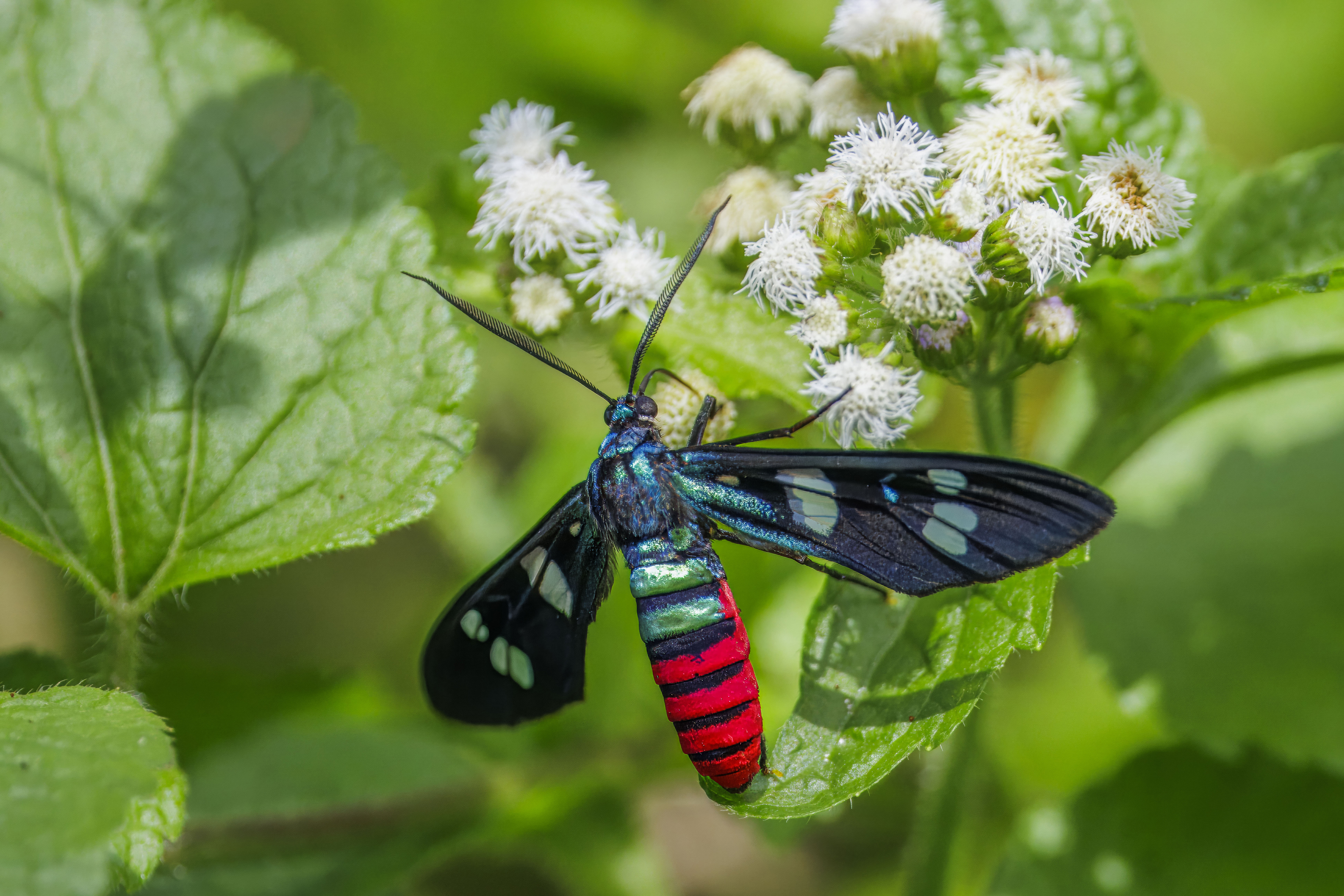
- male, Taveuni, Fiji

Scientific classification
- Kingdom: Animalia
- Phylum: Arthropoda
- Class: Insecta
- Order: Lepidoptera
- Superfamily: Noctuoidea
- Family: Erebidae
- Subfamily: Arctiinae
- Genus: Euchromia
- Species: E. creusa

Binomial name
- Euchromia creusa (Linnaeus, 1758)

Synonyms
- Sphinx creusa Linnaeus, 1758; Sphinx thelebas Cramer, [1777]; Sphinx irus Stoll, [1781]; Glaucopsis ganymede Doubleday, 1846; Euchromia superposita Rothschild, 1916

= Euchromia creusa =

Species of moth

Euchromia creusa is a moth of the subfamily Arctiinae. The species was first described by Carl Linnaeus in his 1758 10th edition of Systema Naturae. It is found in Australia (northern Queensland), Ceram, Key Island, New Guinea, the New Hebrides, the Solomon Islands, the Pelew Islands, Fiji and Vanuatu.

The wingspan is about 50 mm (2.0 in). Adults are wasp mimics.
