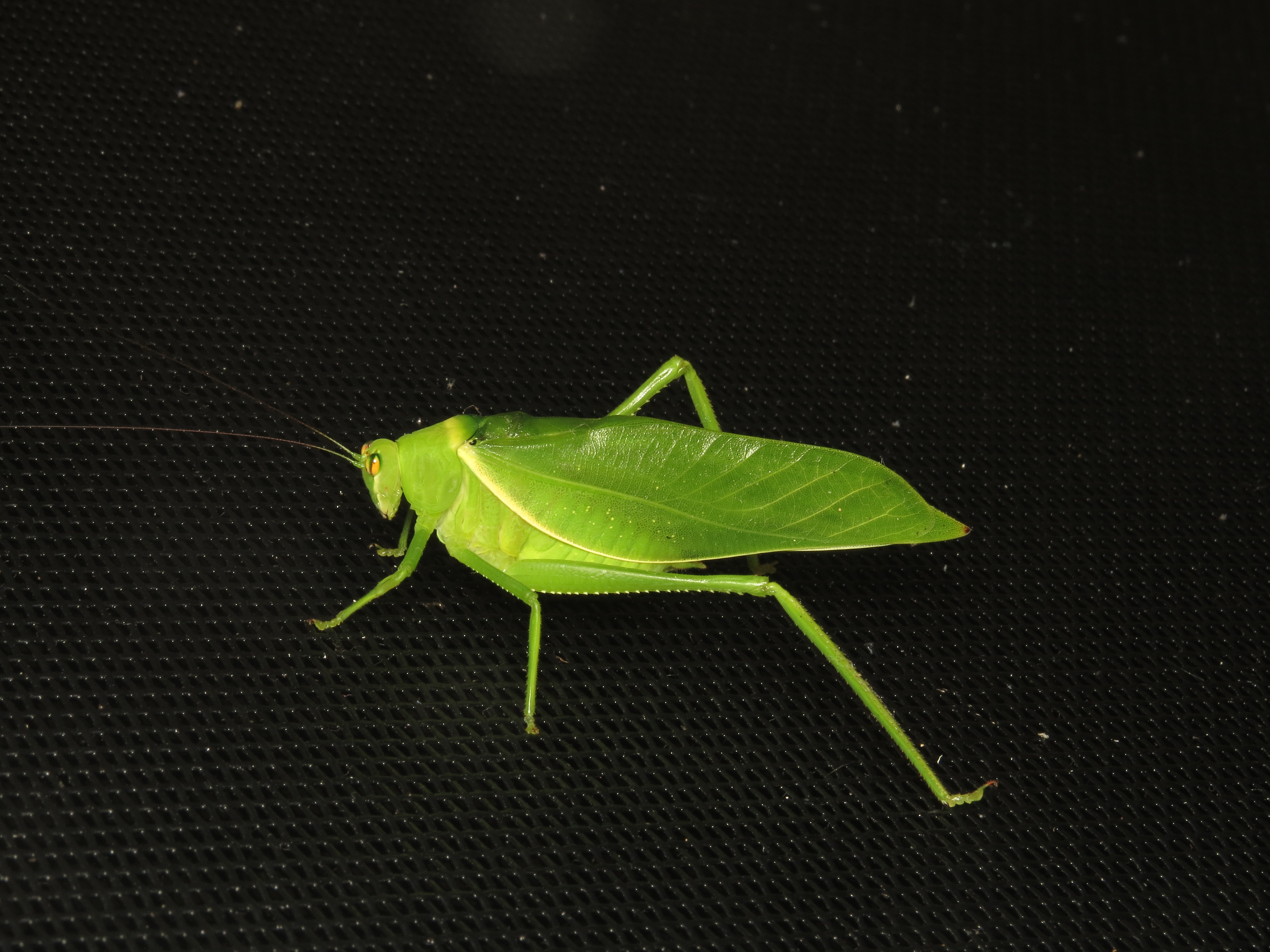
- Paracaedicia serrata

Scientific classification
- Domain: Eukaryota
- Kingdom: Animalia
- Phylum: Arthropoda
- Class: Insecta
- Order: Orthoptera
- Suborder: Ensifera
- Family: Tettigoniidae
- Subfamily: Phaneropterinae
- Genus: Paracaedicia; Brunner von Wattenwyl, 1891

= Paracaedicia =

Genus of cricket-like animals

Paracaedicia is a genus of bush cricket in the subfamily Phaneropterinae. Species can be found mostly in New Guinea.

== Species ==
The Orthoptera Species File and Catalogue of Life list:

- Paracaedicia centrifera Bolívar, 1902
- Paracaedicia disjuncta Karny, 1926
- Paracaedicia femorata Bolívar, 1902
- Paracaedicia melanocondylea Bolívar, 1902
- Paracaedicia nigropunctata Brunner von Wattenwyl, 1891
- Paracaedicia novata Brunner von Wattenwyl, 1898
- Paracaedicia obesa Brunner von Wattenwyl, 1891
- Paracaedicia planicollis Brunner von Wattenwyl, 1891
- Paracaedicia proxima Bolívar, 1902
- Paracaedicia raroramosa Brunner von Wattenwyl, 1891
- Paracaedicia serrata Brunner von Wattenwyl, 1891
- Paracaedicia spinosa Brunner von Wattenwyl, 1891
- Paracaedicia tibialis Brunner von Wattenwyl, 1891 - type species (locality Key Island, New Guinea)
- Paracaedicia verrucosa Brunner von Wattenwyl, 1891
