= Boxen =

Boxen may refer to:

- Boxen (C. S. Lewis), a fictional land developed by C. S. Lewis and his brother Warren Lewis in their childhood
- Boxen Island, Tasmania, Australia
- Jyske Bank Boxen, informally just called Boxen, large indoor arena in Herning, Denmark
- Boxen (album), 1998 box set by Swedish punk band Ebba Grön
