= Billy Goat Reefs =

Islands in Tasmania, Australia

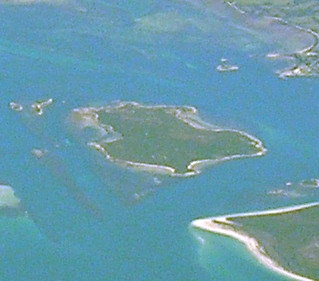
- Billy Goat Reefs appear on the right edge of this picture of Little Green Island

- Location within Tasmania

Geography
- Location: Bass Strait
- Coordinates: 40°13′12″S 148°15′36″E
- Archipelago: Great Dog Group, part of the Furneaux Group
- Total islands: 4
- Area: 1.3 ha (3.2 acres)

Administration
- Australia
- State: Tasmania

The Billy Goat Reefs, part of the Great Dog Group within the Furneaux Group, are a close group of four small islands, joined at low tide, with a combined area of 1.3 hectares (3.2 acres), located in the Bass Strait between the Flinders and Cape Barren islands, in Tasmania, in south-eastern Australia.

== Fauna ==
Recorded breeding seabird and wader species are little penguin, white-faced storm-petrel, sooty oystercatcher and Caspian tern. Reptiles present include the metallic skink, White's skink and white-lipped snake.

== See also ==
- List of islands of Tasmania
