= Samphire (disambiguation) =

Samphire is a name given to several unrelated, edible plants that grow in coastal areas.

Samphire may also refer to:

- Samphire Hoe, Kent, England
- Samphire Island, Tasmania, Australia
- HMS Samphire (K128), a ship
