= Gossys Reef =

Small island in Tasmania, Australia

Coordinates: 39°45′S 147°50′E

Gossys Reef is a small granite island, with an area of 1.5 ha, in south-eastern Australia. It is part of Tasmania’s Sentinel Island Group, lying in eastern Bass Strait off the north-west coast of Flinders Island in the Furneaux Group.

== Fauna ==
Seabirds and waders recorded as breeding on the island include silver gull, Caspian tern and sooty oystercatcher. The metallic skink is also present.
