= South East Great Dog Islet =

Islet in Tasmania, Australia

Coordinates: 40°15′S 148°16′E

South East Great Dog Islet is a small granite island, with an area of 0.6 ha, in south-eastern Australia. It is part of Tasmania’s Great Dog Island Group, lying in eastern Bass Strait between Flinders and Cape Barren Islands in the Furneaux Group. It is very close to the south-eastern end of Great Dog Island.

== Fauna ==
Recorded breeding seabird and wader species are little penguin, white-faced storm-petrel, Pacific gull and sooty oystercatcher.
