= Puncheon Islets =

Coordinates: 40°18′S 148°18′E

Puncheon Islets is a small island, comprising two rocks which are joined at low tide, with an area of less than a hectare, in south-eastern Australia. It is part of Tasmania’s Vansittart Island Group, lying in eastern Bass Strait between Flinders and Cape Barren Islands in the Furneaux Group. It is close to Puncheon Island.

== Fauna ==
Recorded breeding seabird and wader species are Pacific gull, Caspian tern and sooty oystercatcher. Reptiles present are the metallic skink and eastern blue-tongued lizard.
