= Euchromia hampsoni =

Scientific classification
- Domain: Eukaryota
- Kingdom: Animalia
- Phylum: Arthropoda
- Class: Insecta
- Order: Lepidoptera
- Superfamily: Noctuoidea
- Family: Erebidae
- Subfamily: Arctiinae
- Genus: Euchromia
- Species: E. hampsoni

Binomial name
- Euchromia hampsoni Seitz, 1926

Species of moth

Euchromia hampsoni is a species of moth in the subfamily Arctiinae. It is found in Ghana and Sierra Leone.
