= Wright Rock =

Island in Tasmania, Australia

Coordinates: 39°35′S 147°33′E

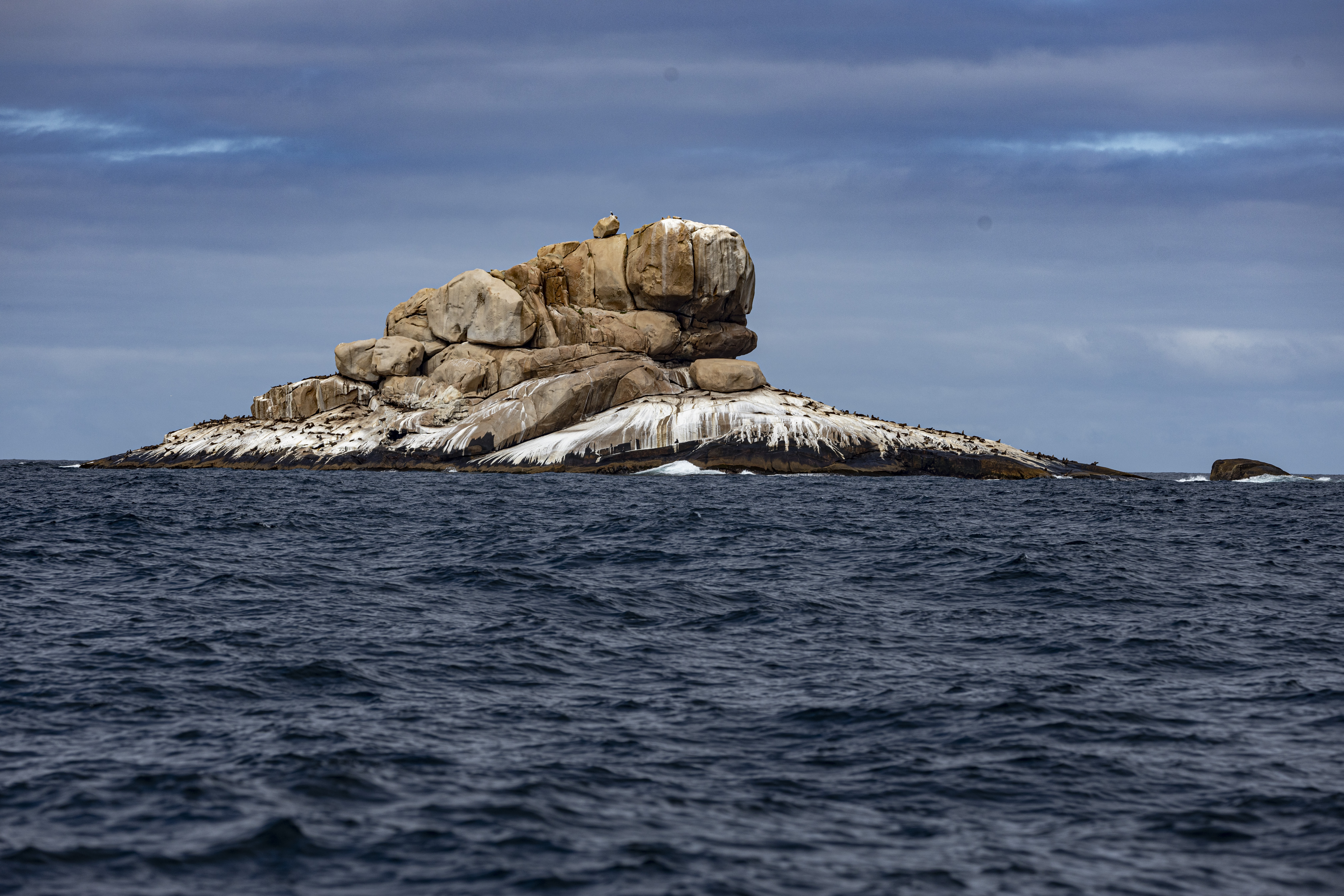

Wright Rock is a small, steep-sided granite island, with an area of 9.36 ha, in south-eastern Australia. It is part of Tasmania’s Bass Pyramid Group, lying in northern Bass Strait between Flinders Island and the Kent Group. It has been a nature reserve since 5 April 1978.

== Fauna ==
Recorded breeding seabird species include Pacific gull and silver gull. It is also an important haul-out site for Australian fur seals, with pups being born there occasionally.

== See also ==
- List of islands of Tasmania
