= Storehouse Island =

Granite island in Tasmania, Australia

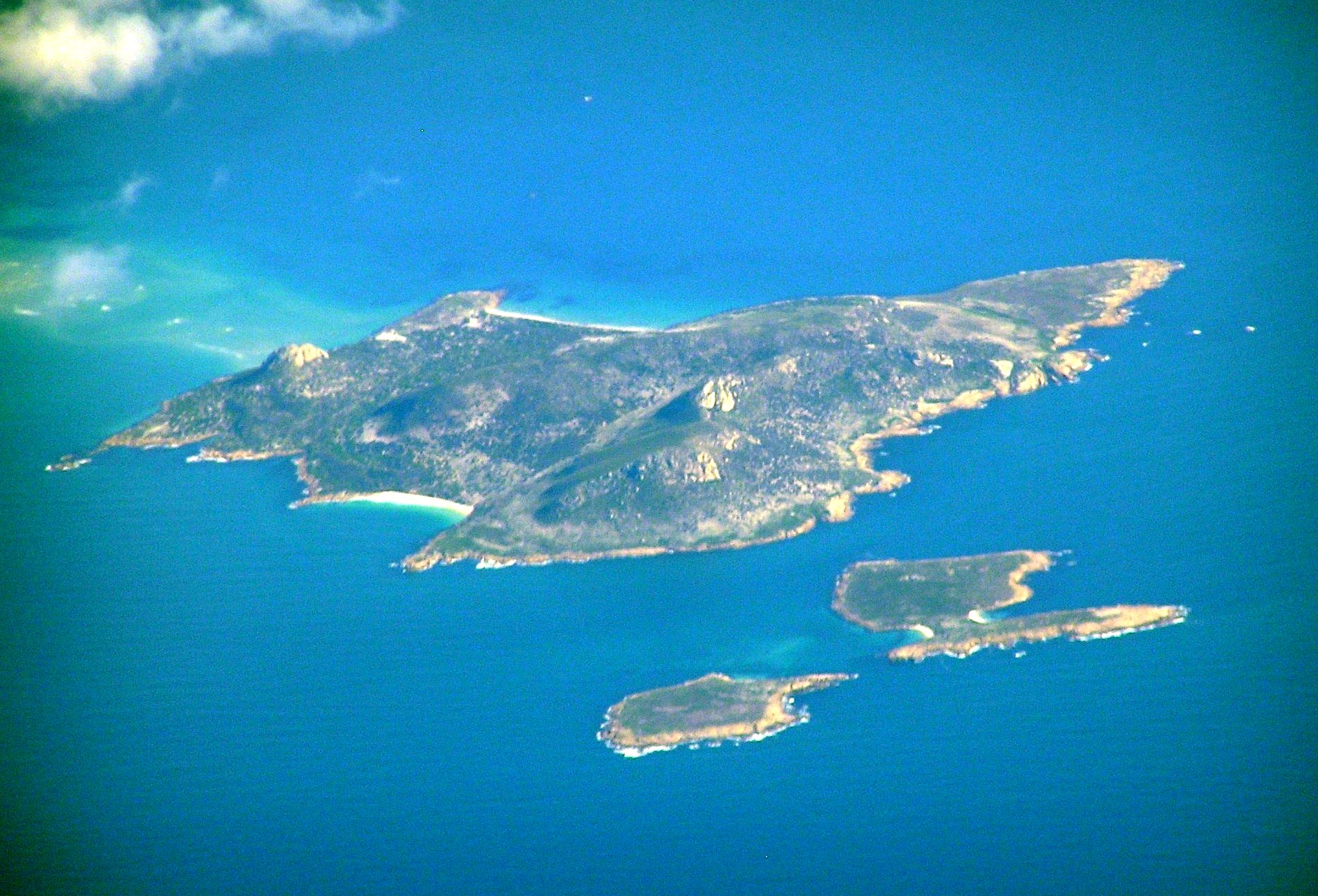
- An aerial photo of Storehouse Island, bottom centre; with the much larger Babel Island pictured in the background. Cat Island is pictured bottom right.

- Location within Tasmania

Geography
- Location: Bass Strait
- Coordinates: 39°57′00″S 148°21′36″E
- Archipelago: Babel Group, part of the Furneaux Group
- Area: 20 ha (49 acres)

Administration
- Australia
- State: Tasmania

Demographics
- Population: unpopulated

The Storehouse Island, part of the Babel Group within the Furneaux Group, is a 20-hectare (49-acre) unpopulated granite island, located in Bass Strait, lying off the east coast of Flinders Island, Tasmania, south of Victoria, in south-eastern Australia.

The Storehouse Island forms part of the Babel Island Group Important Bird Area.

== Fauna ==
Seabirds and waders recorded as breeding on the island include little penguin, short-tailed shearwater, silver gull, Pacific gull and sooty oystercatcher. Resident reptiles include metallic skink and tiger snake. The rakali is thought to visit the island.

== See also ==
- List of islands of Tasmania
