= Euchromia isis =

Scientific classification
- Kingdom: Animalia
- Phylum: Arthropoda
- Clade: Pancrustacea
- Class: Insecta
- Order: Lepidoptera
- Superfamily: Noctuoidea
- Family: Erebidae
- Subfamily: Arctiinae
- Genus: Euchromia
- Species: E. isis

Binomial name
- Euchromia isis (Boisduval, 1832)

Synonyms
- Glaucopis isis Boisduval, 1832; Euchromia rubrilinea Hulstaert, 1924

Species of moth

Euchromia isis is a moth of the subfamily Arctiinae. It was described by Jean Baptiste Boisduval in 1832. It is found on the Duke of York Islands in Papua New Guinea.
