= Euchromia lurlina =

Scientific classification
- Domain: Eukaryota
- Kingdom: Animalia
- Phylum: Arthropoda
- Class: Insecta
- Order: Lepidoptera
- Superfamily: Noctuoidea
- Family: Erebidae
- Subfamily: Arctiinae
- Genus: Euchromia
- Species: E. lurlina

Binomial name
- Euchromia lurlina Butler, 1888

Synonyms
- Euchromia lurlina Butler, 1888; Euchromia intensa Rothschild, 1916

Species of moth

Euchromia lurlina is a moth of the subfamily Arctiinae. It was described by Arthur Gardiner Butler in 1888. It is found on Thursday Island off the northern tip of Australia.
