= Euchromia bourica =

Scientific classification
- Kingdom: Animalia
- Phylum: Arthropoda
- Class: Insecta
- Order: Lepidoptera
- Superfamily: Noctuoidea
- Family: Erebidae
- Subfamily: Arctiinae
- Genus: Euchromia
- Species: E. bourica

Binomial name
- Euchromia bourica (Boisduval, 1832)

Synonyms
- Glaucopis bourica Boisduval, 1832; Hira coelipennis Walker, [1865]; Glaucopis pagenstecheri Röber, 1887

Species of moth

Euchromia bourica is a moth of the subfamily Arctiinae. It was described by Jean Baptiste Boisduval in 1832. It is found in Indonesia on Ambon Island, Seram Island and Buru.
