= Euchromia schoutedeni =

Scientific classification
- Kingdom: Animalia
- Phylum: Arthropoda
- Class: Insecta
- Order: Lepidoptera
- Superfamily: Noctuoidea
- Family: Erebidae
- Subfamily: Arctiinae
- Genus: Euchromia
- Species: E. schoutedeni

Binomial name
- Euchromia schoutedeni Debauche, 1936

Species of moth

Euchromia schoutedeni is a species of moth in the subfamily Arctiinae. It is found in the Democratic Republic of Congo.
