= Marriott Reef =

Reef in Australia

Coordinates: 39°55′S 147°51′E

Marriott Reef is a small group of granite islets, with a combined area of 3.4 ha, in south-eastern Australia. It forms part of Tasmania’s Pasco Island Group, lying in eastern Bass Strait off the north-west coast of Flinders Island in the Furneaux Group.

== Fauna ==
Seabirds and waders recorded as breeding on the island include little penguin, short-tailed shearwater, Pacific gull and sooty oystercatcher.

== See also ==
- List of islands of Tasmania
