= Euchromia oenone =

Scientific classification
- Domain: Eukaryota
- Kingdom: Animalia
- Phylum: Arthropoda
- Class: Insecta
- Order: Lepidoptera
- Superfamily: Noctuoidea
- Family: Erebidae
- Subfamily: Arctiinae
- Genus: Euchromia
- Species: E. oenone

Binomial name
- Euchromia oenone Butler, 1876

Species of moth

Euchromia oenone is a moth of the subfamily Arctiinae. It was described by Arthur Gardiner Butler in 1876. It is found in the Solomon Islands.
