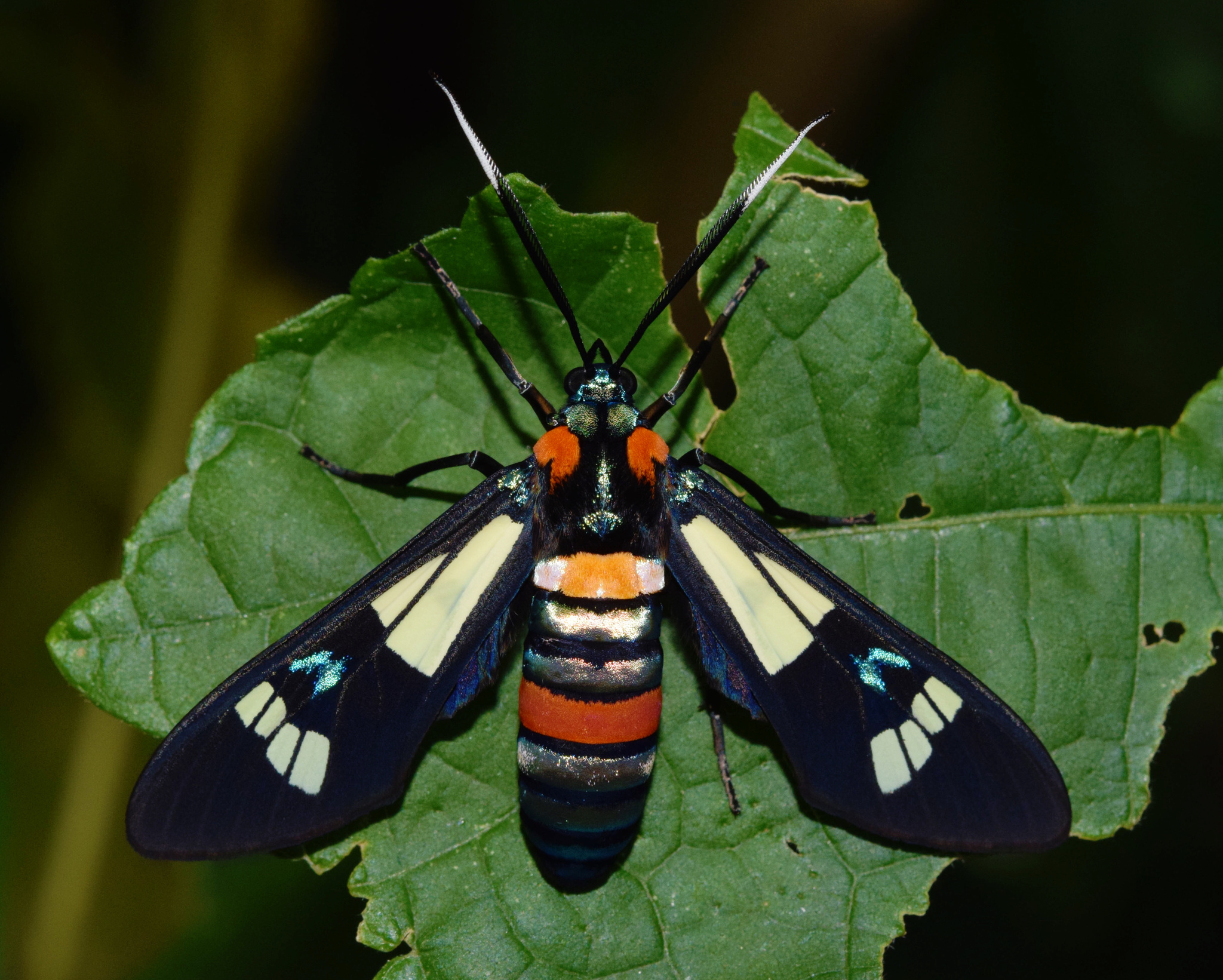

Scientific classification
- Kingdom: Animalia
- Phylum: Arthropoda
- Clade: Pancrustacea
- Class: Insecta
- Order: Lepidoptera
- Superfamily: Noctuoidea
- Family: Erebidae
- Subfamily: Arctiinae
- Genus: Euchromia
- Species: E. folletii

Binomial name
- Euchromia folletii (Guérin-Méneville, 1832)

Synonyms
- Glaucopis folletii Guérin-Méneville, 1832; Glaucopis formosa Boisduval, 1833; Euchromia formosa

= Euchromia folletii =

Species of moth

Euchromia folletii, the South African day-flying moth, is a species of moth of the subfamily Arctiinae. It was described by Félix Édouard Guérin-Méneville in 1832. It is found on the Comoros and Seychelles, as well as in Ethiopia, Kenya, Madagascar, Mozambique, Senegal, Sierra Leone, South Africa and Tanzania and as of recent times some parts of Nigeria too.
