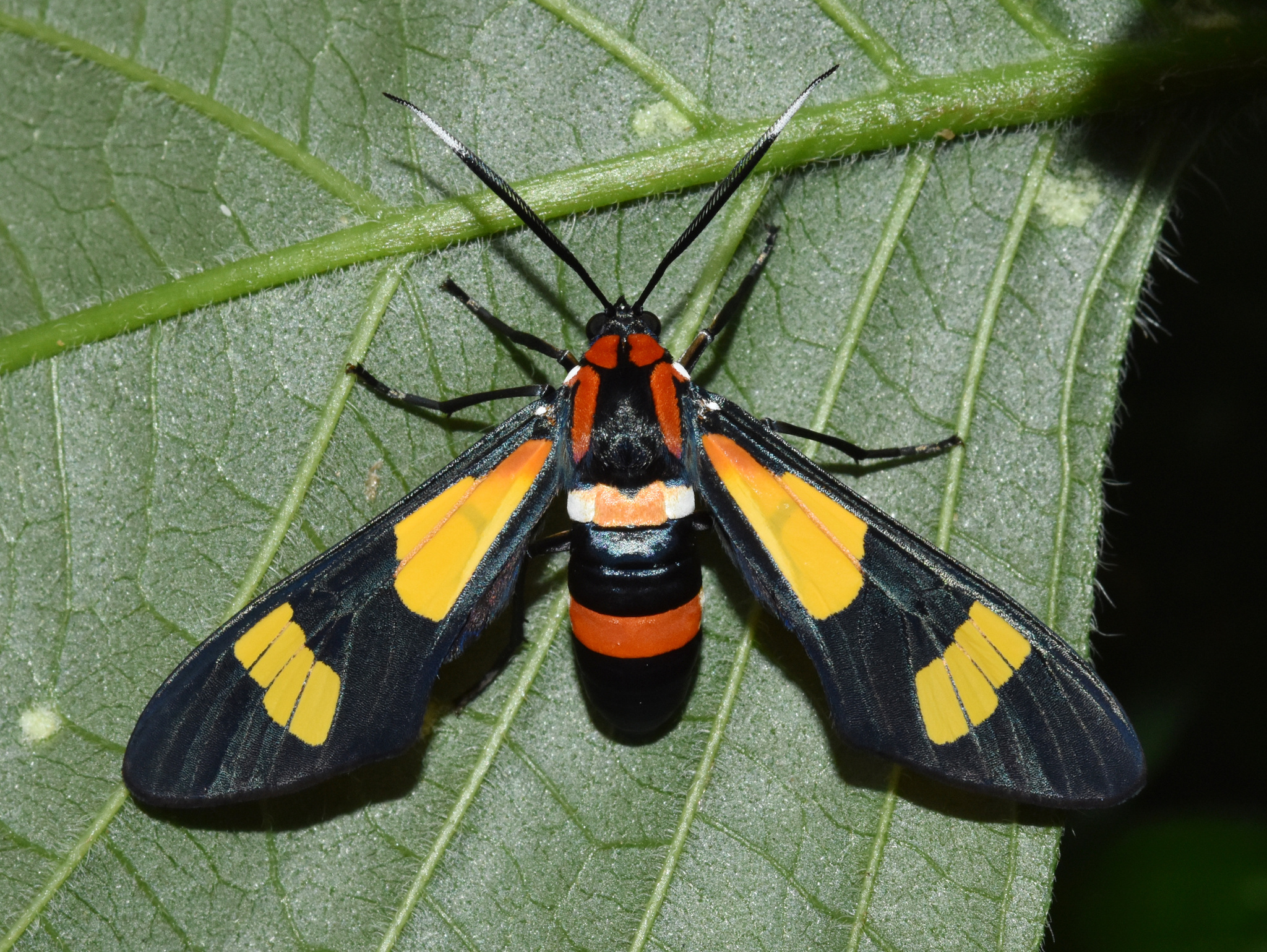

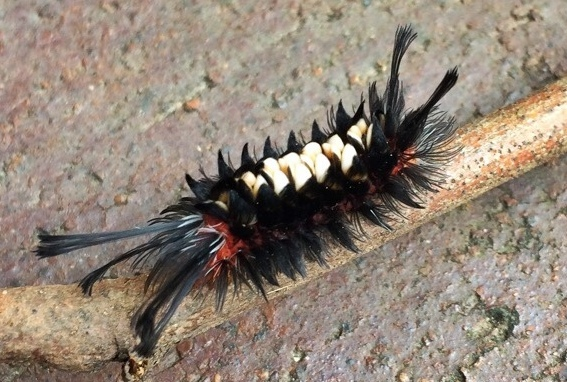
- Adult (top), larva (bottom)

Scientific classification
- Kingdom: Animalia
- Phylum: Arthropoda
- Class: Insecta
- Order: Lepidoptera
- Superfamily: Noctuoidea
- Family: Erebidae
- Subfamily: Arctiinae
- Genus: Euchromia
- Species: E. amoena

Binomial name
- Euchromia amoena (Möschler, 1872)

Synonyms
- Phalanna amoena Möschler, 1872; Euchromia africana Butler, 1876

= Euchromia amoena =

Species of moth

Euchromia amoena, the pleasant hornet moth, is a moth of the subfamily Arctiinae. It was described by Heinrich Benno Möschler in 1872.

== Description ==
Euchromia amoena has a wingspan of about 44–52 millimetres (1.7–2.0 in). Forewings are black, with a golden-yellow basal half, red at the base, with black veins and a golden-yellow postmedian band. Hindwings are golden yellow with a broad black apical border. On the abdomen there are two pale yellow bands.

The larvae feed on Carissa macrocarpa, Ipomoea, Secamone gerrardi and Stictocardia tiliifolia.

== Distribution ==
It is found in Bangladesh, Kenya, Madagascar, Mozambique, South Africa and Tanzania.
