= Euchromia auranticincta =

Scientific classification
- Kingdom: Animalia
- Phylum: Arthropoda
- Class: Insecta
- Order: Lepidoptera
- Superfamily: Noctuoidea
- Family: Erebidae
- Subfamily: Arctiinae
- Genus: Euchromia
- Species: E. auranticincta

Binomial name
- Euchromia auranticincta Hampson, 1898

Species of moth

Euchromia auranticincta is a moth of the subfamily Arctiinae. It was described by George Hampson in 1898. It is found on New Guinea.
