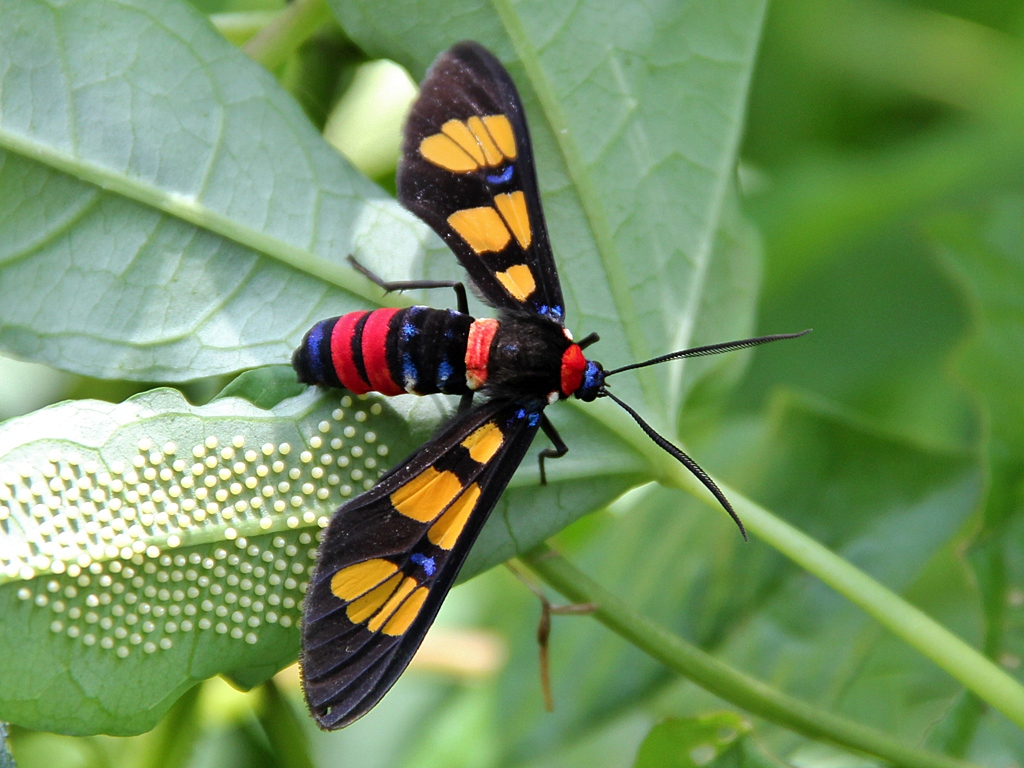
- Euchromia polymena laying eggs

Scientific classification
- Kingdom: Animalia
- Phylum: Arthropoda
- Clade: Pancrustacea
- Class: Insecta
- Order: Lepidoptera
- Superfamily: Noctuoidea
- Family: Erebidae
- Subfamily: Arctiinae
- Subtribe: Euchromiina
- Genus: Euchromia; Hübner, [1819]

Synonyms
- Phalanna Walker, 1854; Hira Walker, 1854

= Euchromia =

Genus of moths

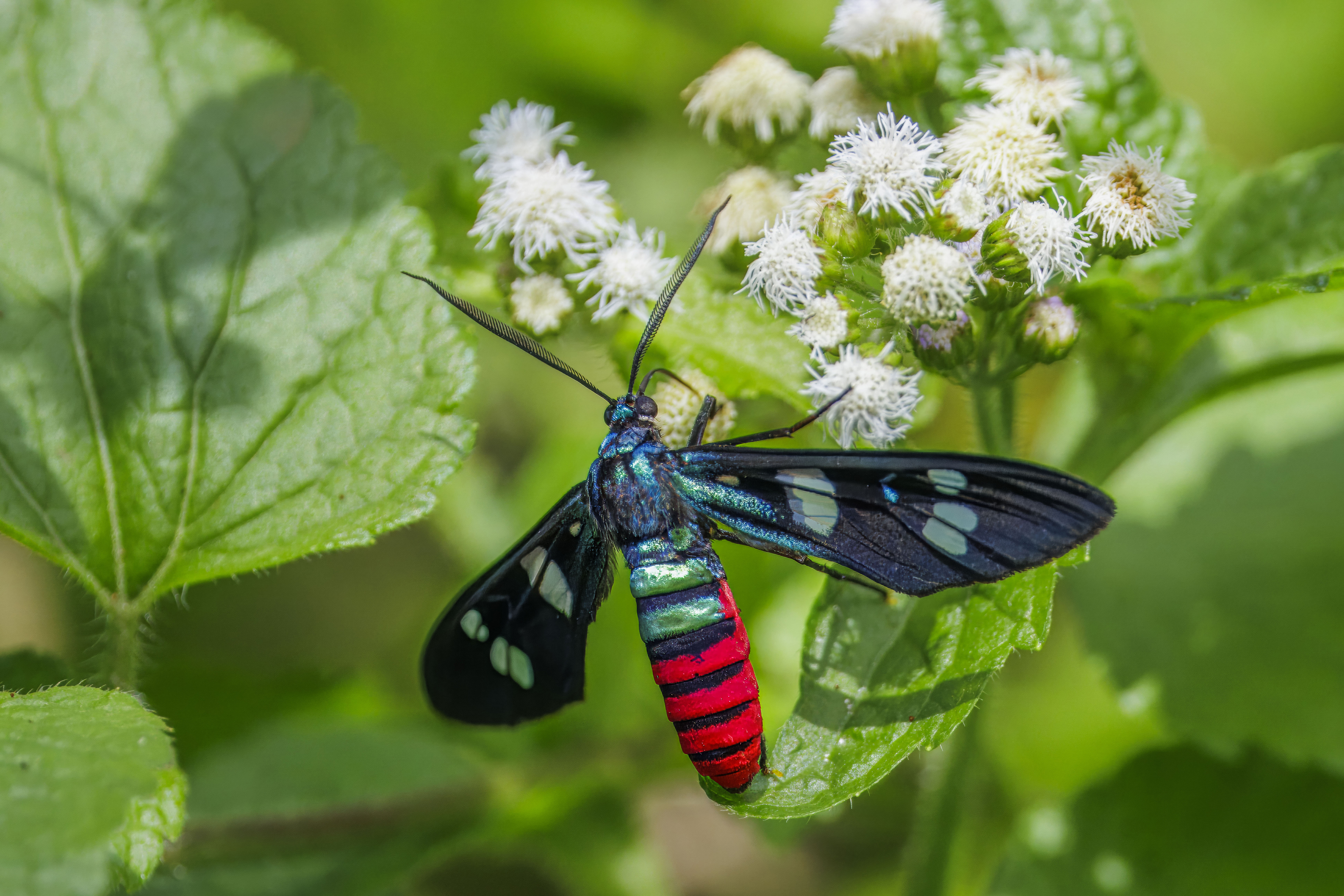
E. creusa, Fiji

Euchromia is a genus of moths in the subfamily Arctiinae. The genus was erected by Jacob Hübner in 1819. The genus Euchromia, established by Jacob Hübner in 1819, comprises some of the most vividly colored tropical burnet moths within the subfamily Arctiinae of the family Erebidae. These moths are renowned for their brilliant hues and striking patterns, often resembling wasps—a form of Batesian mimicry that serves as a defense mechanism against predators.

In his 1888 paper, entomologist Arthur G. Butler provided a comprehensive review of the Euchromia species housed in the British Museum (Natural History), describing 26 species and highlighting their distinct characteristics and geographical distributions.

Also, a paper by A. G. Butler, presented to the Entomological Society, new species of the Euchromia genus were discussed, along with descriptions of these species in the British Museum's collection. This contribution is significant in understanding the diversity and taxonomy of Euchromia. Butler's work, published in the Proceedings of the Entomological Society (date unknown), adds to the knowledge of Euchromia by formally documenting new species and enriching the scientific understanding of the genus.

== Species ==
- Euchromia aemulina Butler, 1877
- Euchromia amboinica Hampson, 1898
- Euchromia amoena (Möschler, 1872)
- Euchromia auranticincta Hampson, 1898
- Euchromia bourica (Boisduval, 1832)
- Euchromia cincta (Montrouzier, 1864)
- Euchromia creusa (Linnaeus, 1758)
- Euchromia cyanitis Meyrick, 1889
- Euchromia dubia (Röber, 1887)
- Euchromia folletii (Guérin-Méneville, 1832)
- Euchromia gemmata Butler, 1887
- Euchromia guineensis (Fabricius, 1775)
- Euchromia hampsoni Seitz, 1926
- Euchromia horsfieldi (Moore, 1859)
- Euchromia irius (Boisduval, 1832)
- Euchromia isis (Boisduval, 1832)
- Euchromia jacksoni Bethune-Baker, 1911
- Euchromia lethe (Fabricius, 1775)
- Euchromia lurlina Butler, 1888
- Euchromia madagascariensis (Boisduval, 1833)
- Euchromia magna (Swinhoe, 1891)
- Euchromia mathewi Butler, 1888
- Euchromia oenone Butler, 1876
- Euchromia paula (Röber, 1887)
- Euchromia polymena (Linnaeus, 1758)
- Euchromia rubricollis (Walker, [1865])
- Euchromia schoutedeni Debauche, 1936
- Euchromia walkeri Hampson, 1898
