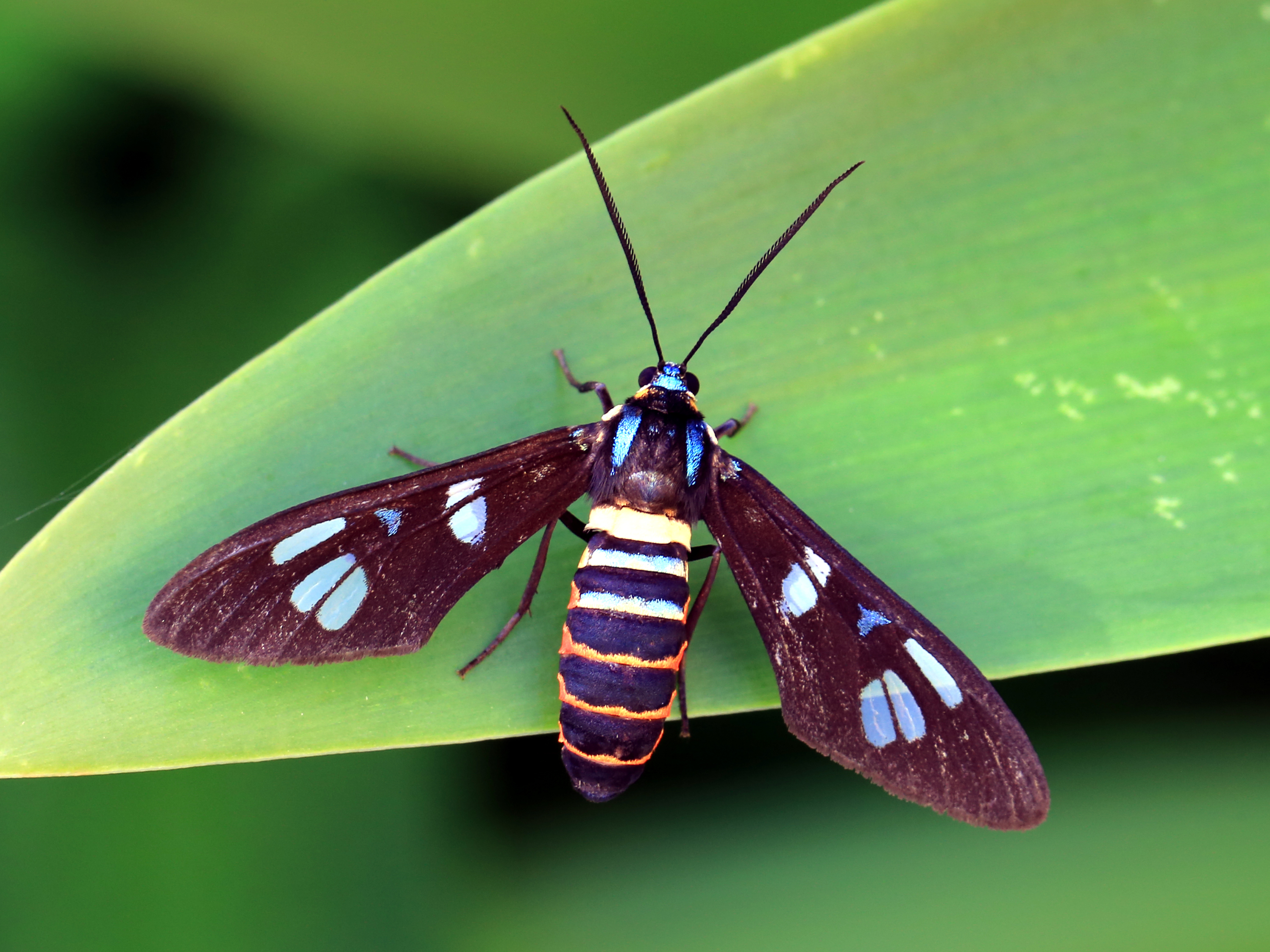
- Cairns, Queensland, Australia.

Scientific classification
- Domain: Eukaryota
- Kingdom: Animalia
- Phylum: Arthropoda
- Class: Insecta
- Order: Lepidoptera
- Superfamily: Noctuoidea
- Family: Erebidae
- Subfamily: Arctiinae
- Genus: Euchromia
- Species: E. aemulina

Binomial name
- Euchromia aemulina Butler, 1877

Synonyms
- Euchromia minuta Rothschild, 1916

= Euchromia aemulina =

Species of moth

Euchromia aemulina is a moth of the subfamily Arctiinae. It was described by Arthur Gardiner Butler in 1877. It is found in New Guinea and more recently in Australia.
