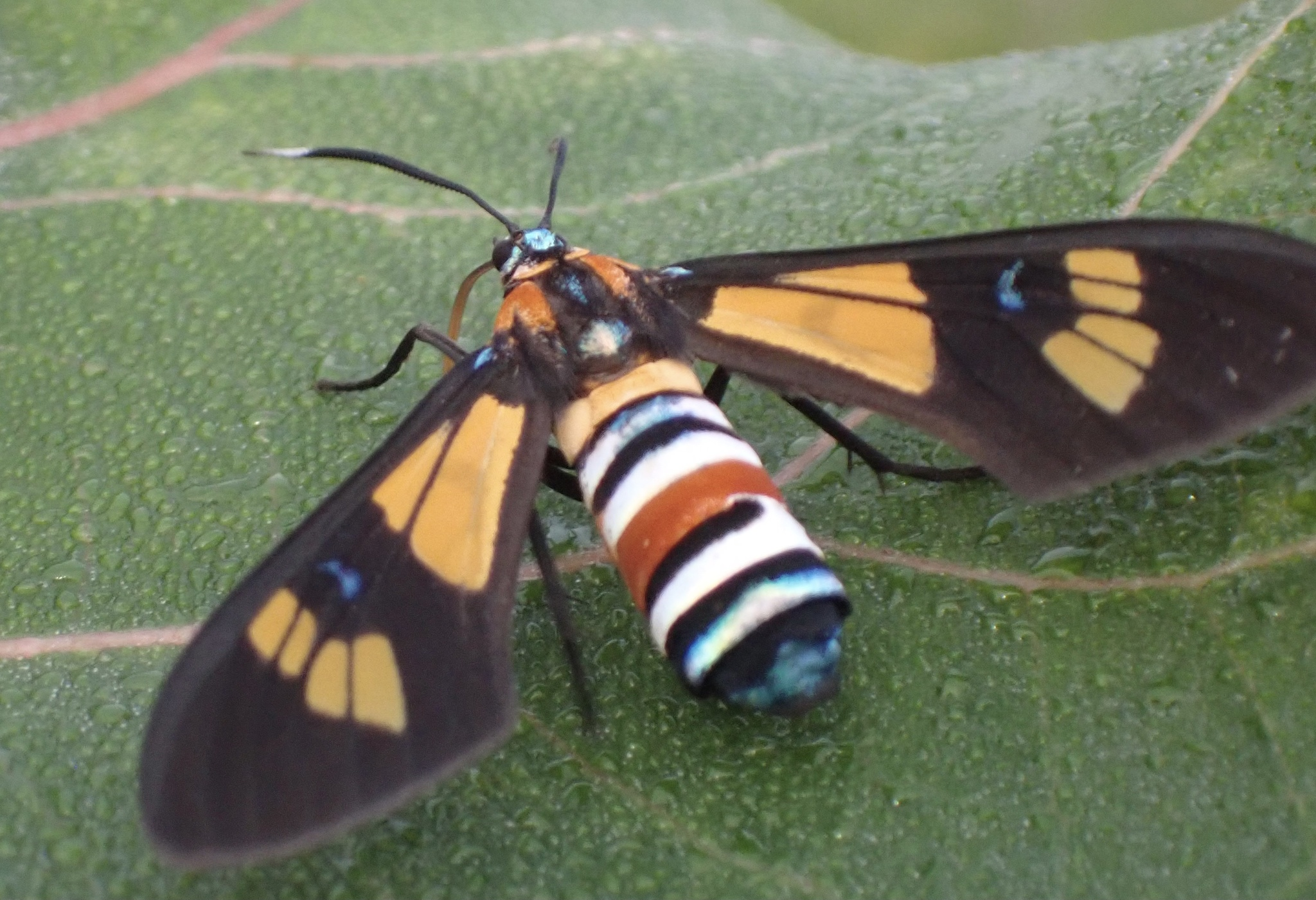

Scientific classification
- Domain: Eukaryota
- Kingdom: Animalia
- Phylum: Arthropoda
- Class: Insecta
- Order: Lepidoptera
- Superfamily: Noctuoidea
- Family: Erebidae
- Subfamily: Arctiinae
- Genus: Euchromia
- Species: E. lethe

Binomial name
- Euchromia lethe (Fabricius, 1775)

Synonyms
- Zygaena lethe Fabricius, 1775; Sphinx eumolphus Cramer, [1779]; Euchromia fulvida Butler, 1888; Euchromia nigricincta Joicey & Talbot, 1926

= Euchromia lethe =

Species of moth

Euchromia lethe is a moth of the subfamily Arctiinae. It was described by Johan Christian Fabricius in 1775. It is found in Angola, Cameroon, the Republic of the Congo, the Democratic Republic of the Congo, Equatorial Guinea, Guinea-Bissau, Madagascar, Niger, Nigeria, Senegal, Sierra Leone, South Africa, São Tomé and Principe, the Gambia, Ghana and Uganda.

The larvae feed on Ipomoea batatas.
