= Euchromia gemmata =

Scientific classification
- Domain: Eukaryota
- Kingdom: Animalia
- Phylum: Arthropoda
- Class: Insecta
- Order: Lepidoptera
- Superfamily: Noctuoidea
- Family: Erebidae
- Subfamily: Arctiinae
- Genus: Euchromia
- Species: E. gemmata

Binomial name
- Euchromia gemmata Butler, 1887

Species of moth

Euchromia gemmata is a moth of the subfamily Arctiinae. It was described by Arthur Gardiner Butler in 1887. It is found on the Solomon Islands.
