= Babel Island =

Island in Tasmania, Australia

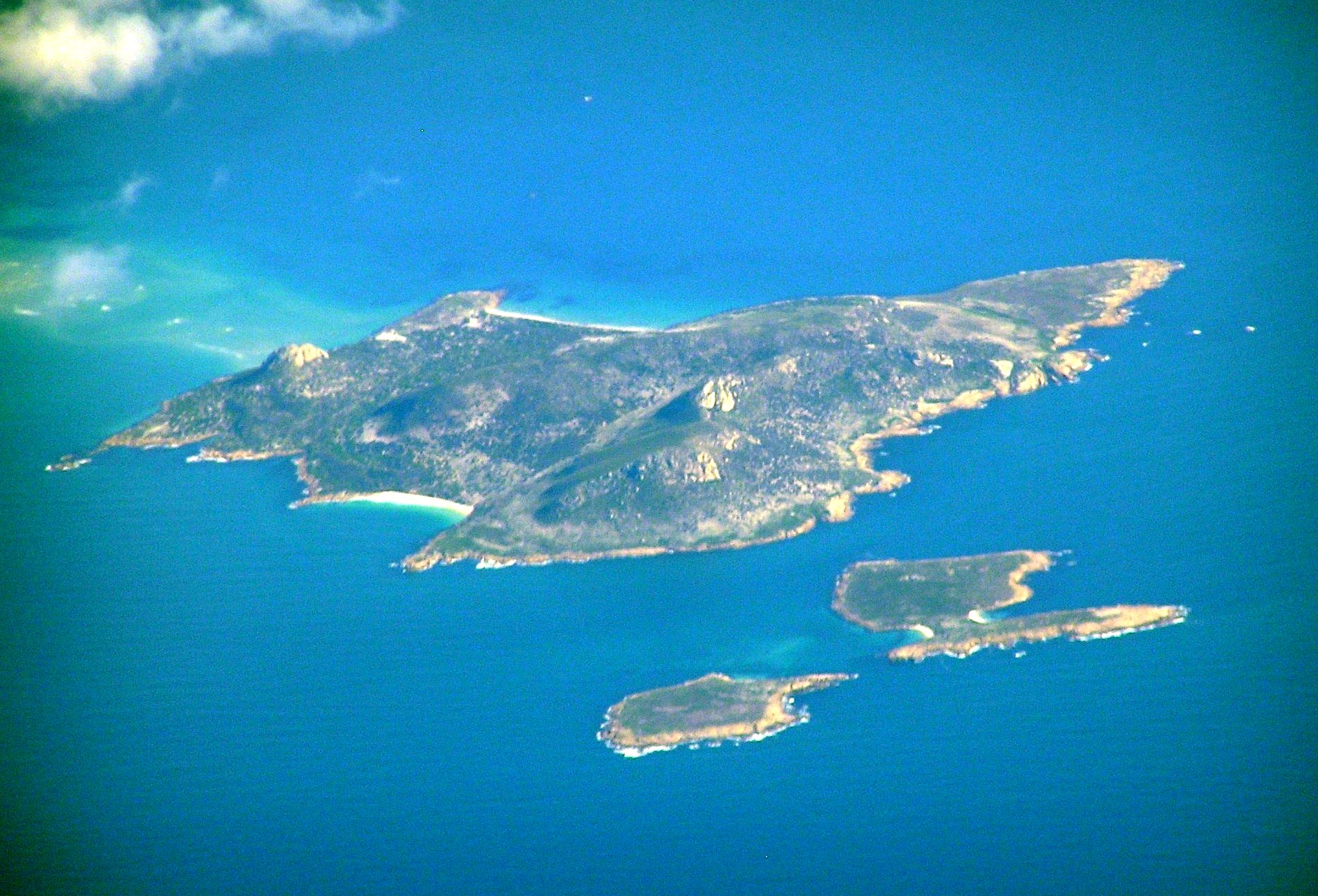
- An aerial photo of Babel Island, with the smaller Cat and Storehouse islands, as viewed from the south east.

- Location within Tasmania

Geography
- Location: Bass Strait
- Coordinates: 39°56′24″S 148°19′48″E
- Archipelago: Furneaux Group
- Area: 440 ha (1,100 acres)
- Length: 3 km (1.9 mi)
- Width: 2.8 km (1.74 mi)
- Highest elevation: 197 m (646 ft)

Administration
- Australia
- State: Tasmania

The Babel Island, part of the Babel Group within the Furneaux Group, is a 440-hectare (1,100-acre) granite island, located in Bass Strait, lying off the east coast of Flinders Island, Tasmania, south of Victoria, Australia. The privately owned island was named by Matthew Flinders from the noises made by the seabirds there.

In 1995 freehold title to Babel Island was vested in the Aboriginal Land Council of Tasmania, on behalf of the Tasmanian Aboriginal community, under the Aboriginal Lands Act 1995 (Tas).

Besides Babel Island, other islands as part of the Babel Group include the Cat and Storehouse islands and Fifty Foot Rock.

== Fauna ==
Many seals were reported here in 1817. The Babel Island group is classified as an Important Bird Area. Babel island is home to the largest colony of short-tailed shearwaters in the world, with an estimated 2.8 million pairs, or about 12% of the whole population of this species, and is subject to annual muttonbirding. It also has a major colony of little penguins, with 20,000 pairs. As well as the shearwaters and penguins, other seabirds and waders recorded as breeding on the island include silver gull, Pacific gull, sooty oystercatcher and crested tern. White-bellied sea-eagles breed on the island and peregrine falcons nest on the eastern cliffs.

Mammals found there are the red-necked wallaby and Tasmanian pademelon as well as the introduced house mouse and Tasmanian devil. Resident reptiles include the metallic skink, three-lined skink, White's skink, eastern blue-tongued lizard and tiger snake.
