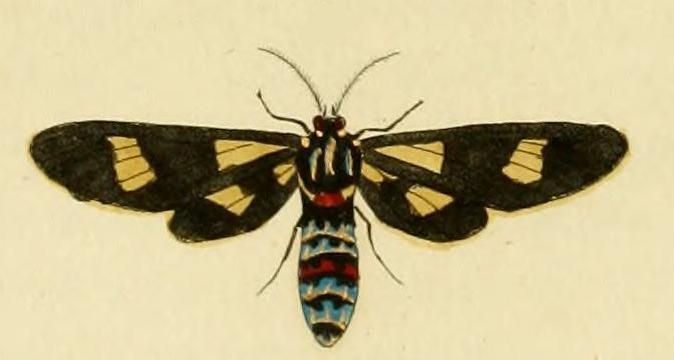

Scientific classification
- Domain: Eukaryota
- Kingdom: Animalia
- Phylum: Arthropoda
- Class: Insecta
- Order: Lepidoptera
- Superfamily: Noctuoidea
- Family: Erebidae
- Subfamily: Arctiinae
- Genus: Euchromia
- Species: E. guineensis

Binomial name
- Euchromia guineensis (Fabricius, 1775)

Synonyms
- Zygaeena guineensis Fabricius, 1775; Sphinx sperchius Cramer, [1777]; Euchromia interstans Walker, 1854; Euchromia leonis Butler, 1876; Euchromia bellula Mabille, 1890; Euchromia guineensis splendens Butler, 1888; Euchromia guineensis ab. discifera Zerny, 1912; Euchromia guineensis var. jullieni Debauche, 1936

= Euchromia guineensis =

Species of moth

Euchromia guineensis is a moth of the subfamily Arctiinae first described by Johan Christian Fabricius in 1775. It is found in Angola, Cameroon, the Republic of the Congo, the Democratic Republic of the Congo, Equatorial Guinea, Gabon, Ghana, Nigeria, Sierra Leone, the Gambia and Uganda.
