= Euchromia paula =

Scientific classification
- Domain: Eukaryota
- Kingdom: Animalia
- Phylum: Arthropoda
- Class: Insecta
- Order: Lepidoptera
- Superfamily: Noctuoidea
- Family: Erebidae
- Subfamily: Arctiinae
- Genus: Euchromia
- Species: E. paula

Binomial name
- Euchromia paula (Röber, 1887)

Synonyms
- Glaucopis paula Röber, 1887; Glaucopis roberi Röber, 1887

Species of moth

Euchromia paula is a moth of the subfamily Arctiinae. It was described by Röber in 1887. It is found on Sulawesi in Indonesia.
