= Little Island (Tasmania) =

Island in Tasmania, Australia

Coordinates: 39°49′S 147°49′E

Little Island is a granite island, with an area of 3 ha, in south-eastern Australia. It is part of Tasmania’s Sentinel Island Group, lying in eastern Bass Strait off the north-west coast of Flinders Island in the Furneaux Group.

== Fauna ==
Seabirds and waders recorded as breeding on the island include little penguin, short-tailed shearwater, white-faced storm-petrel, Pacific gull, Caspian tern and sooty oystercatcher.
