= Big Black Reef =

Unpopulated island off the coast of Tasmania

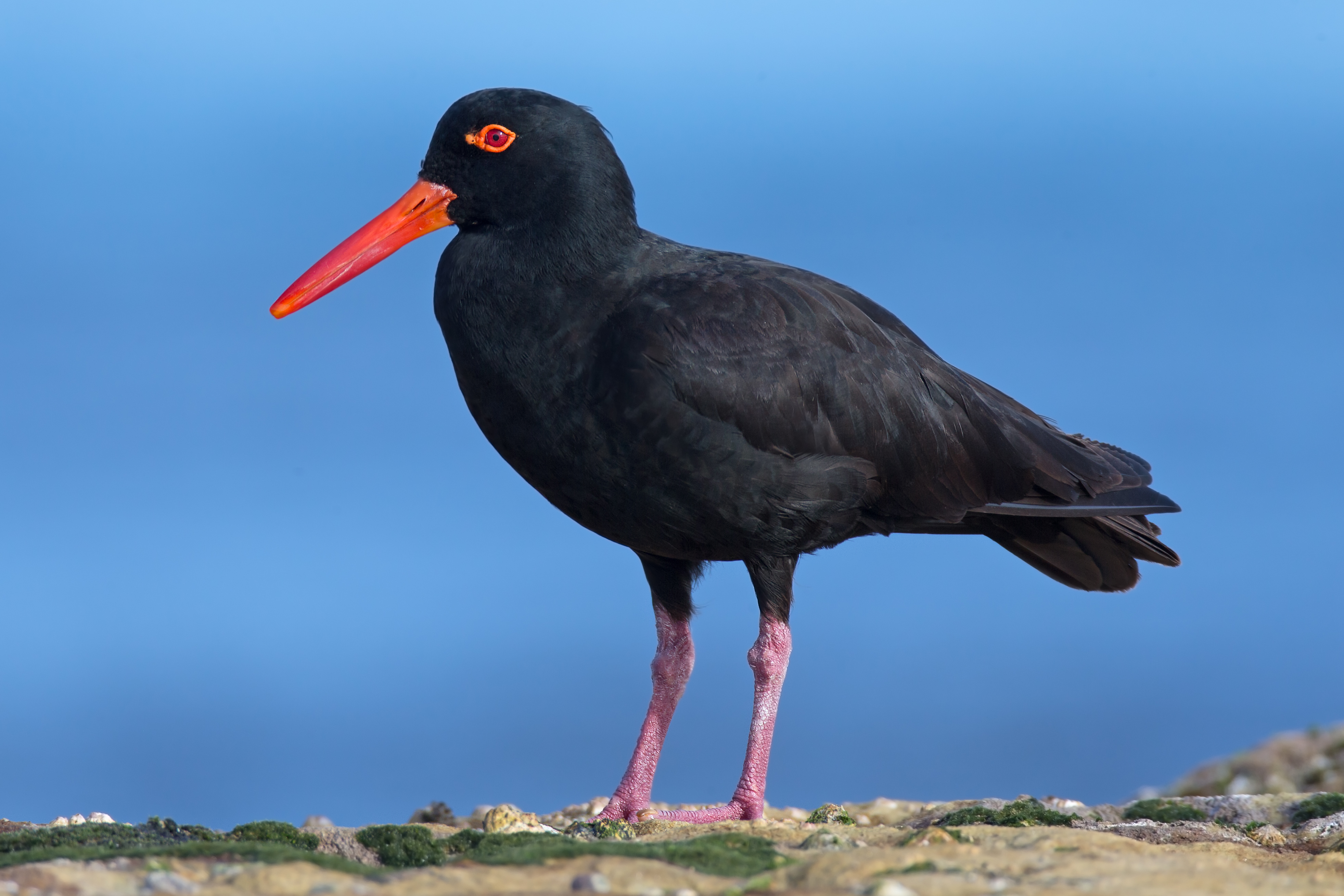
- Sooty oystercatchers breed on Big Black Reef

- Location within Tasmania

Geography
- Location: Bass Strait
- Coordinates: 40°23′24″S 147°57′00″E
- Archipelago: Long Island Group, part of the Furneaux Group
- Area: 0.54 ha (1.3 acres)

Administration
- Australia
- State: Tasmania

The Big Black Reef, part of the Long Island Group within the Furneaux Group, is a 0.54-hectare (1.3-acre) unpopulated small, flat dolerite island, located in Bass Strait, lying west of Cape Barren Island, Tasmania, in south-eastern Australia.

Together with the nearby Boxen Island, Big Black Reef is classified by BirdLife International as an Important Bird Area because it has been recorded as supporting 288 breeding pairs of black-faced cormorants.

== Flora and fauna ==
As well as black-faced cormorant, recorded breeding seabird and wader species include little penguin, Pacific gull, sooty oystercatcher and Caspian tern.

== See also ==
- List of islands of Tasmania
