= Bird Island (Prime Seal Group) =

Island in northeast Tasmania, Australia

Coordinates: 40°00′S 147°51′E

Bird Island is a small granite island with an area of 1.5 ha, in south-eastern Australia. It is part of Tasmania’s Prime Seal Island Group, lying in eastern Bass Strait west of Flinders in the Furneaux Group. It is joined to Flinders Island at low tide.

== Fauna ==
Recorded breeding seabird and wader species are short-tailed shearwater and sooty oystercatcher.

== See also ==
- List of islands of Tasmania
