= Cat Island (Tasmania) =

Island in Tasmania, Australia

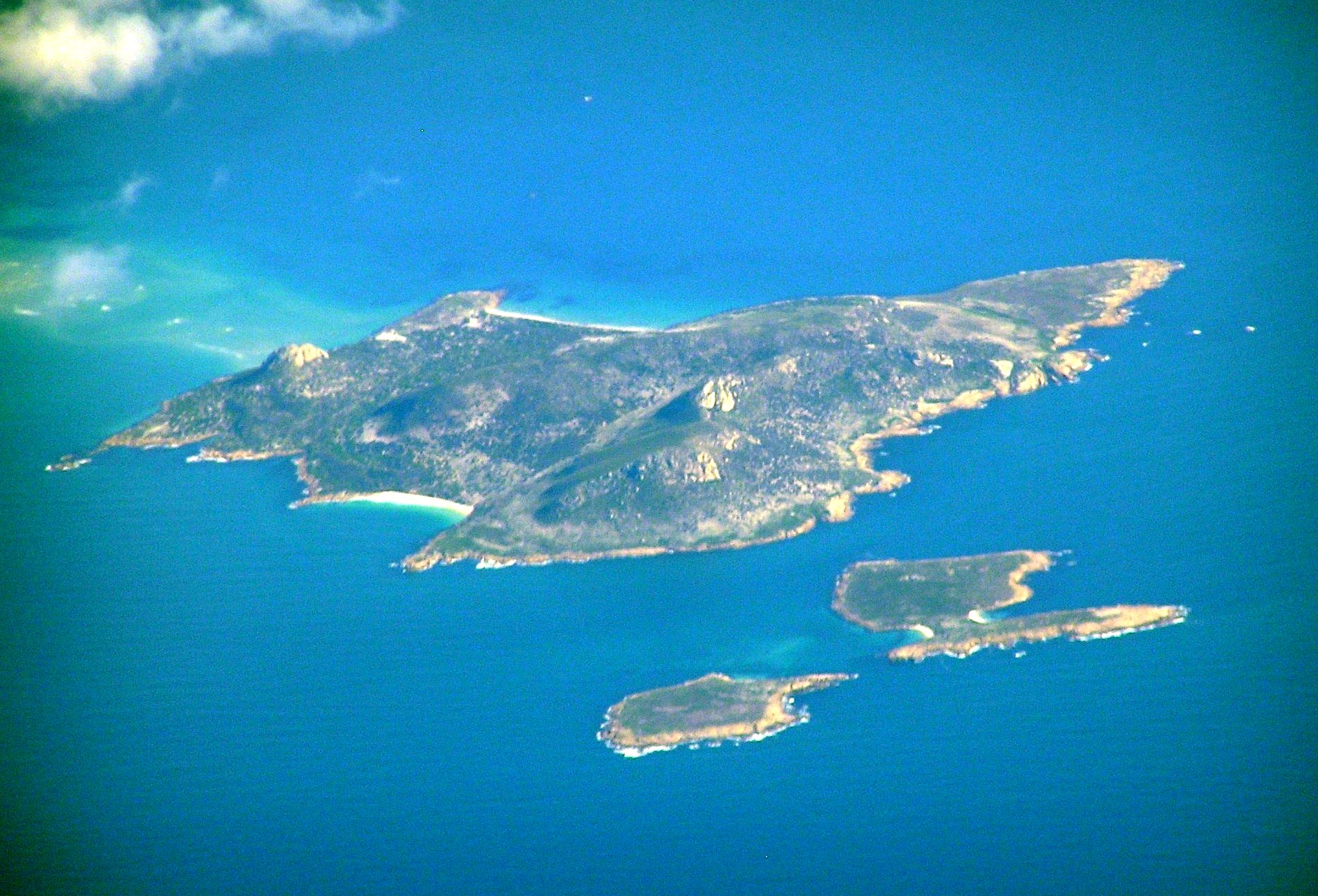
- An aerial photo of Cat Island, bottom right; with the much larger Babel Island pictured in the background. Storehouse Island is pictured bottom centre.

- Location within Tasmania

Geography
- Location: Bass Strait
- Coordinates: 39°57′S 148°21′E
- Archipelago: Babel Group, part of the Furneaux Group
- Area: 39 ha (96 acres)

Administration
- Australia
- State: Tasmania

Demographics
- Population: unpopulated

The Cat Island, part of the Babel Group within the Furneaux Group, is a 39-hectare (96-acre) unpopulated granite island, located in Bass Strait, lying off the east coast of Flinders Island, Tasmania, south of Victoria, in south-eastern Australia.

Cat Island is part of the Babel Island Group Important Bird Area.

== Fauna ==
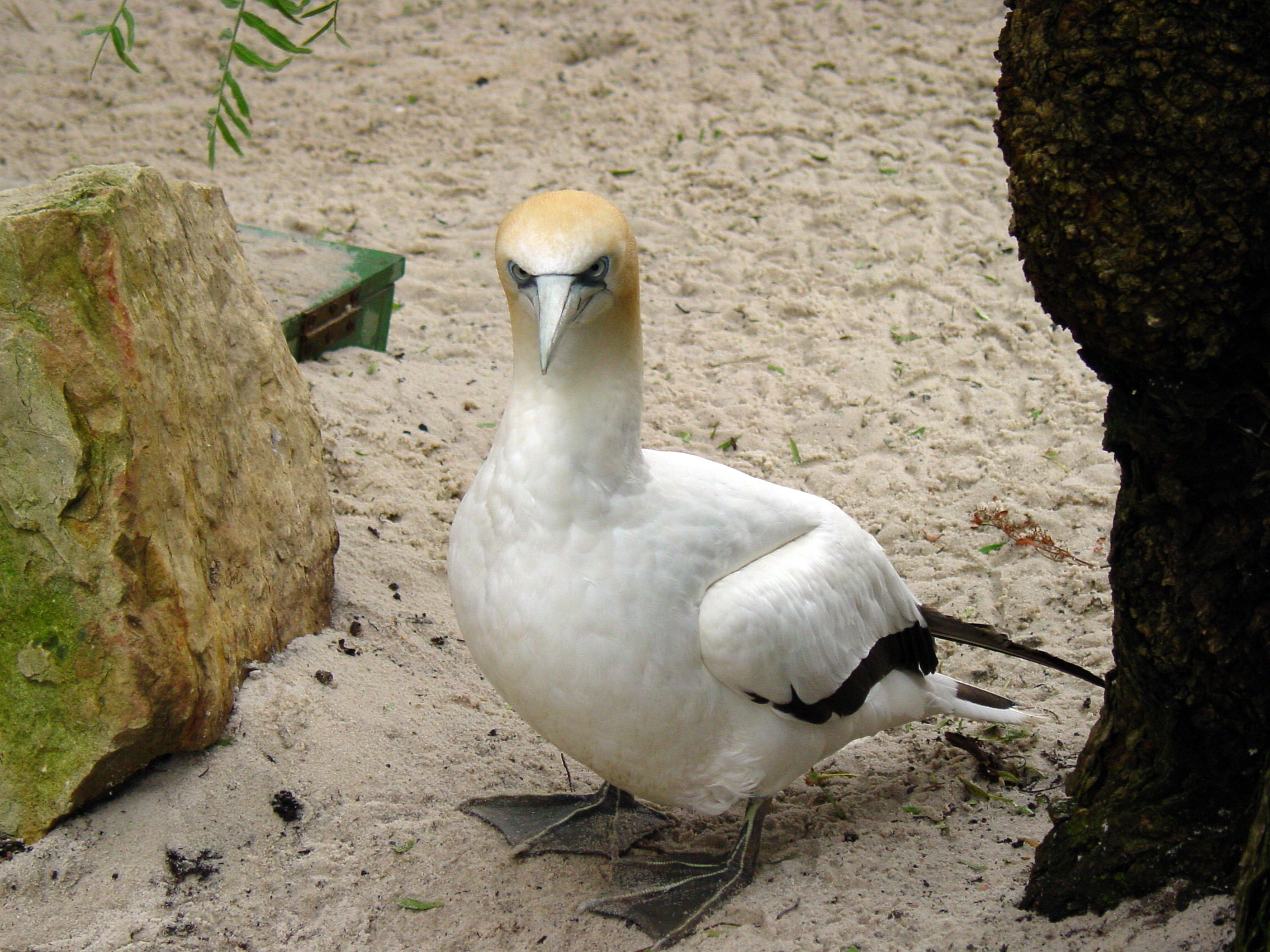
Cat Island used to be an important breeding site for Australasian gannets.

Seabirds and waders recorded as breeding on the island include little penguin, short-tailed shearwater, silver gull, Pacific gull, crested tern, sooty oystercatcher, pied oystercatcher and Australasian gannet. Resident reptiles include White's skink and tiger snake. The rakali has also been recorded on the island.

The historically important breeding colony of Australasian gannets, with an estimated 5,000-10,000 birds at the beginning of the 20th century, declined to extinction by the mid-1980s as a result of, at first, human intrusion, followed by fires, disturbance and, finally, predation by white-bellied sea-eagles.

== See also ==
- List of islands of Tasmania
