= Middle Pasco Islands =

Islands in Tasmania, Australia

Coordinates: 39°56′S 147°46′E

The Middle Pasco Islands comprise two similarly sized adjacent granite islands, with a combined area of 8.37 ha, in south-eastern Australia. They form part of Tasmania’s Pasco Island Group, lying in eastern Bass Strait off the north-west coast of Flinders Island in the Furneaux Group.

== Fauna ==
Seabirds and waders recorded as breeding on the islands include little penguin, short-tailed shearwater, white-faced storm-petrel and sooty oystercatcher.

== See also ==
- List of islands of Tasmania
