= Euchromia walkeri =

Scientific classification
- Kingdom: Animalia
- Phylum: Arthropoda
- Class: Insecta
- Order: Lepidoptera
- Superfamily: Noctuoidea
- Family: Erebidae
- Subfamily: Arctiinae
- Genus: Euchromia
- Species: E. walkeri

Binomial name
- Euchromia walkeri Hampson, 1898

Species of moth

Euchromia walkeri is a moth of the subfamily Arctiinae. It was described by George Hampson in 1898. It is found on Ternate in Indonesia.
