= Great Dog Island (Tasmania) =

Island in Tasmania, Australia

Nickname: Big Dog Island
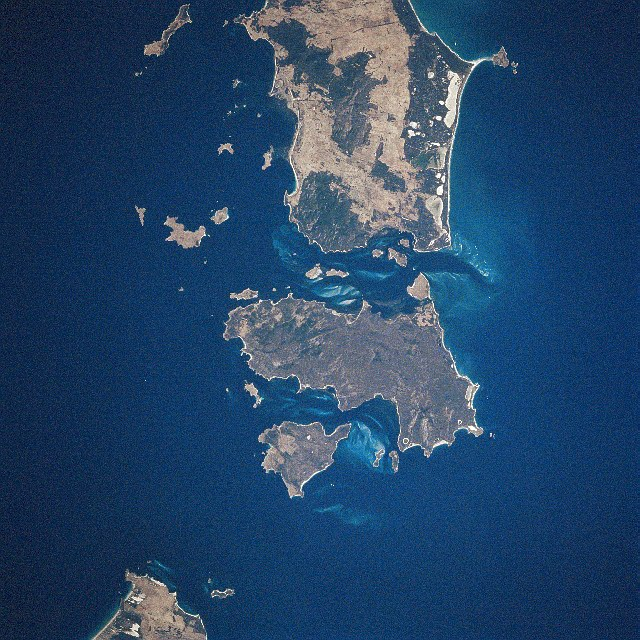
- Great Dog Island (centre) from space, January 1997

- Location within Tasmania

Geography
- Location: Bass Strait
- Coordinates: 40°14′53.3″S 148°14′52.4″E
- Archipelago: Great Dog Group, part of the Furneaux Group
- Area: 3.75 km^{2} (1.45 sq mi)

Administration
- Australia
- State: Tasmania
- LGA: Municipality of Flinders Island
- Largest settlement: Great Dog Island village (pop. 10)

Demographics
- Population: 10 (2014)
- Pop. density: 2.67/km^{2} (6.92/sq mi)

The Great Dog Island, also known as Big Dog Island, and part of the Great Dog Group within the Furneaux Group, is a 354-hectare (870-acre) granite island, located in Bass Strait, lying south of the Flinders Island and north of the Cape Barren Island, in Tasmania, in south-eastern Australia.

The island is private property and has been severely affected by grazing livestock, fire, muttonbirding and the introduction of exotic animals. The island is part of the Franklin Sound Islands Important Bird Area, identified as such by BirdLife International because it holds over 1% of the world populations of six bird species.

== History ==
George Robinson visited the island in the 1830s and records sealers taking mutton birds there in 1837.

== Great Dog Island Group ==
The Great Dog Island Group includes:

- Great Dog Island
- Little Green Island
- Billy Goat Reefs
- South East Great Dog Islet
- Little Dog Island
- Samphire Island
- Fisher Island
- Fisher Island Reef
- Briggs Islet
- Spences Reefs

== Flora and fauna ==
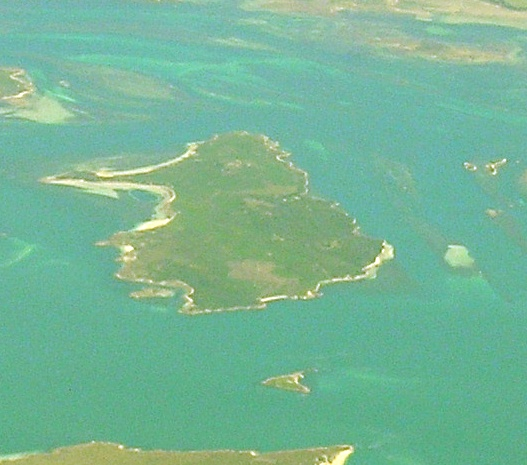
Great Dog Island viewed from the air, from the east

The island's vegetation is dominated by the grass Poa poiformis, aided by the burrowing and fertilising activities of the shearwaters in conjunction with regular burning-off. However, at the north-eastern side of the island, there is a remnant mixed forest community, rare within the Furneaux Group, of manna gum and Acacia verticillata with various species of Allocasuarina, Melaleuca and Leptospermum.

Recorded breeding seabird and wader species are short-tailed shearwater (about 300,000 pairs), white-faced storm-petrel, sooty oystercatcher and pied oystercatcher. Reptiles present include the metallic skink, spotted skink, eastern three-lined skink, eastern blue-tongued lizard, lowland copperhead and tiger snake. A native mammal recorded from the island is the rakali, along with introduced mice, rats and feral cats.

== See also ==
- List of islands of Tasmania
