= Sentinel Island (Tasmania) =

Island in Tasmania, Australia

Coordinates: 39°50′S 147°46′E

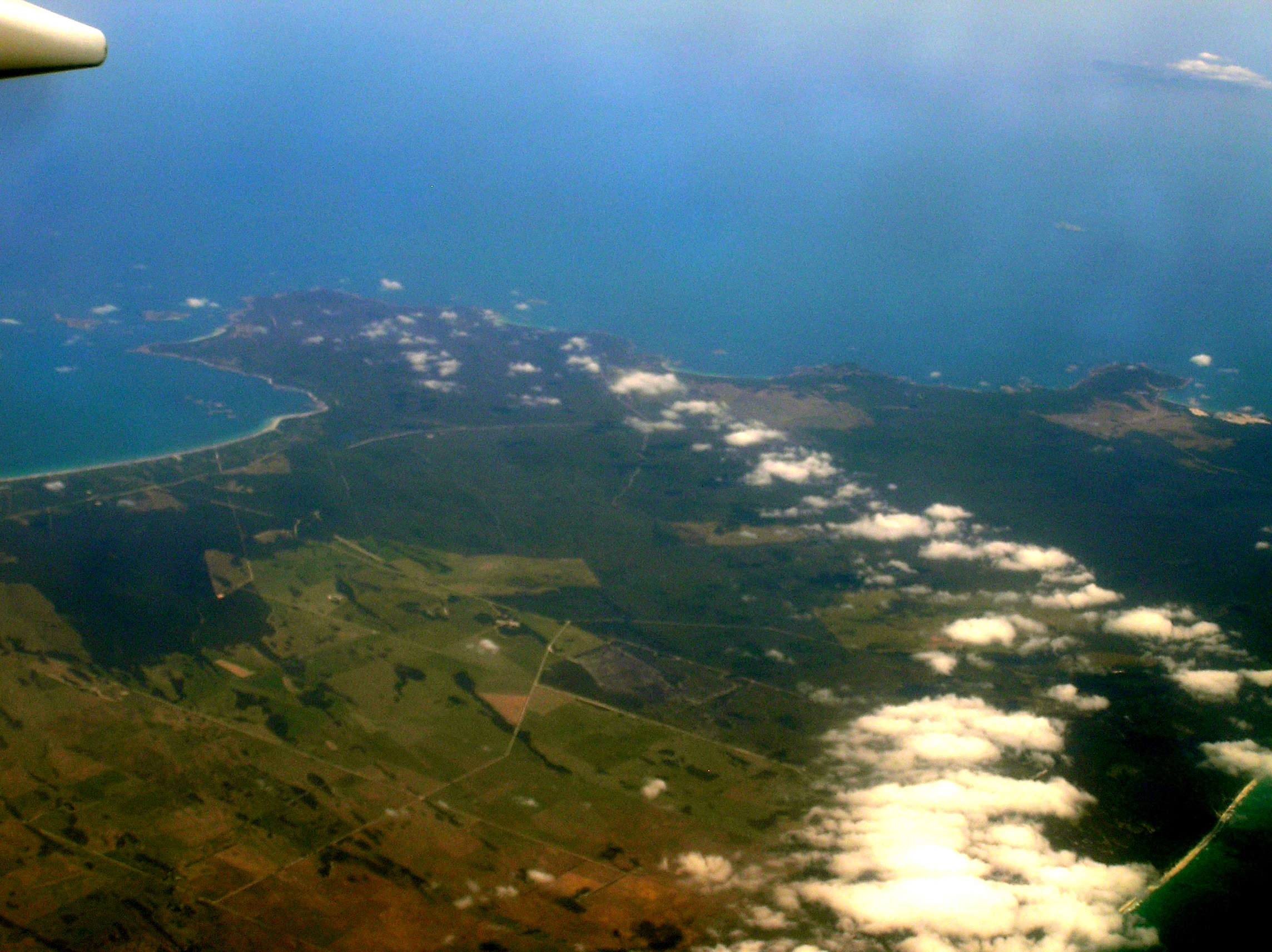
Sentinel Island is near the left edge of the top of the photo, just off the coast of Flinders Island

Sentinel Island is a granite island, with an area of 10 ha, in south-eastern Australia. It is part of Tasmania’s Sentinel Island Group, lying in eastern Bass Strait off the north-west coast of Flinders Island in the Furneaux Group. Until 1985 it was used for grazing sheep.

== Sentinel Island Group ==
The Sentinel Island Group includes:

- Sentinel Island
- Gossys Reef
- Little Island

== Fauna ==
Seabirds and waders recorded as breeding on the island include little penguin, short-tailed shearwater, common diving-petrel, white-faced storm-petrel, silver gull, Pacific gull, Caspian tern and sooty oystercatcher. The metallic skink is present.

== See also ==
- List of islands of Tasmania
