= Euchromia cincta =

Scientific classification
- Domain: Eukaryota
- Kingdom: Animalia
- Phylum: Arthropoda
- Class: Insecta
- Order: Lepidoptera
- Superfamily: Noctuoidea
- Family: Erebidae
- Subfamily: Arctiinae
- Genus: Euchromia
- Species: E. cincta

Binomial name
- Euchromia cincta (Montrouzier, 1864)

Synonyms
- Glaucopis cincta Montrouzier, 1864

Species of moth

Euchromia cincta is a moth of the subfamily Arctiinae. It was described by Xavier Montrouzier in 1864. It is found in New Caledonia east of Australia.
