= Euchromia rubricollis =

Scientific classification
- Kingdom: Animalia
- Phylum: Arthropoda
- Class: Insecta
- Order: Lepidoptera
- Superfamily: Noctuoidea
- Family: Erebidae
- Subfamily: Arctiinae
- Genus: Euchromia
- Species: E. rubricollis

Binomial name
- Euchromia rubricollis (Walker, [1865])

Synonyms
- Hira rubricollis Walker, [1865]

Species of moth

Euchromia rubricollis is a moth of the subfamily Arctiinae. It was described by Francis Walker in 1865. It is found on the New Hebrides and the Solomon Islands.
