= Euchromia cyanitis =

Scientific classification
- Kingdom: Animalia
- Phylum: Arthropoda
- Class: Insecta
- Order: Lepidoptera
- Superfamily: Noctuoidea
- Family: Erebidae
- Subfamily: Arctiinae
- Genus: Euchromia
- Species: E. cyanitis

Binomial name
- Euchromia cyanitis Meyrick, 1889

Species of moth

Euchromia cyanitis is a moth of the subfamily Arctiinae. It was described by Edward Meyrick in 1889. It is found in New Guinea.
