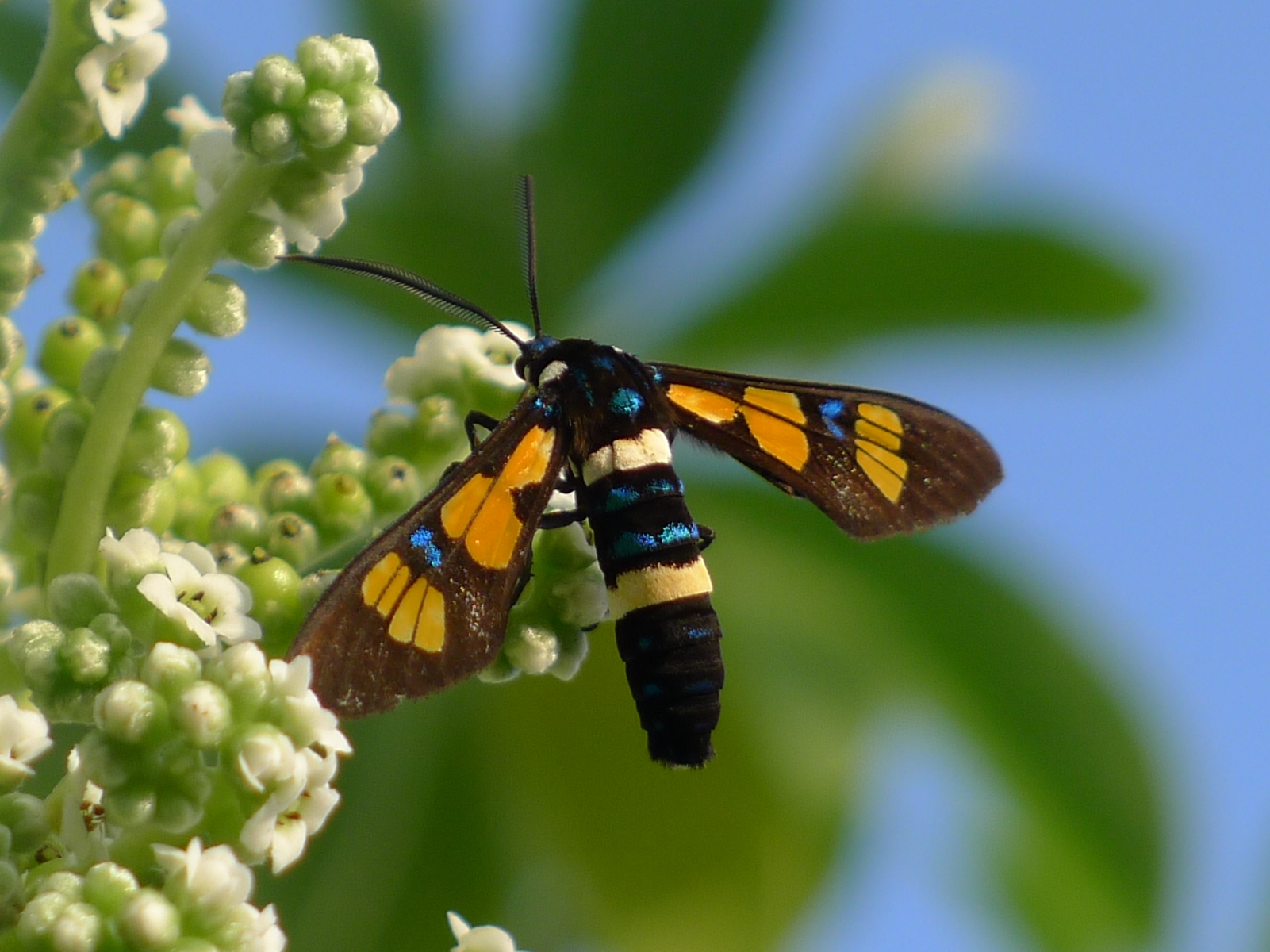

Scientific classification
- Domain: Eukaryota
- Kingdom: Animalia
- Phylum: Arthropoda
- Class: Insecta
- Order: Lepidoptera
- Superfamily: Noctuoidea
- Family: Erebidae
- Subfamily: Arctiinae
- Genus: Euchromia
- Species: E. horsfieldi

Binomial name
- Euchromia horsfieldi (Moore, 1859)

Synonyms
- Phalanna horsfieldi Moore, 1859

= Euchromia horsfieldi =

Species of moth

Euchromia horsfieldi is a species of moth in the subfamily Arctiinae first described by Frederic Moore in 1859. It is found on Java, Sumatra, Borneo, the Lesser Sunda Islands and Christmas Island.

The wingspan is 42–44 mm.

The larvae feed on Dioscorea species.
