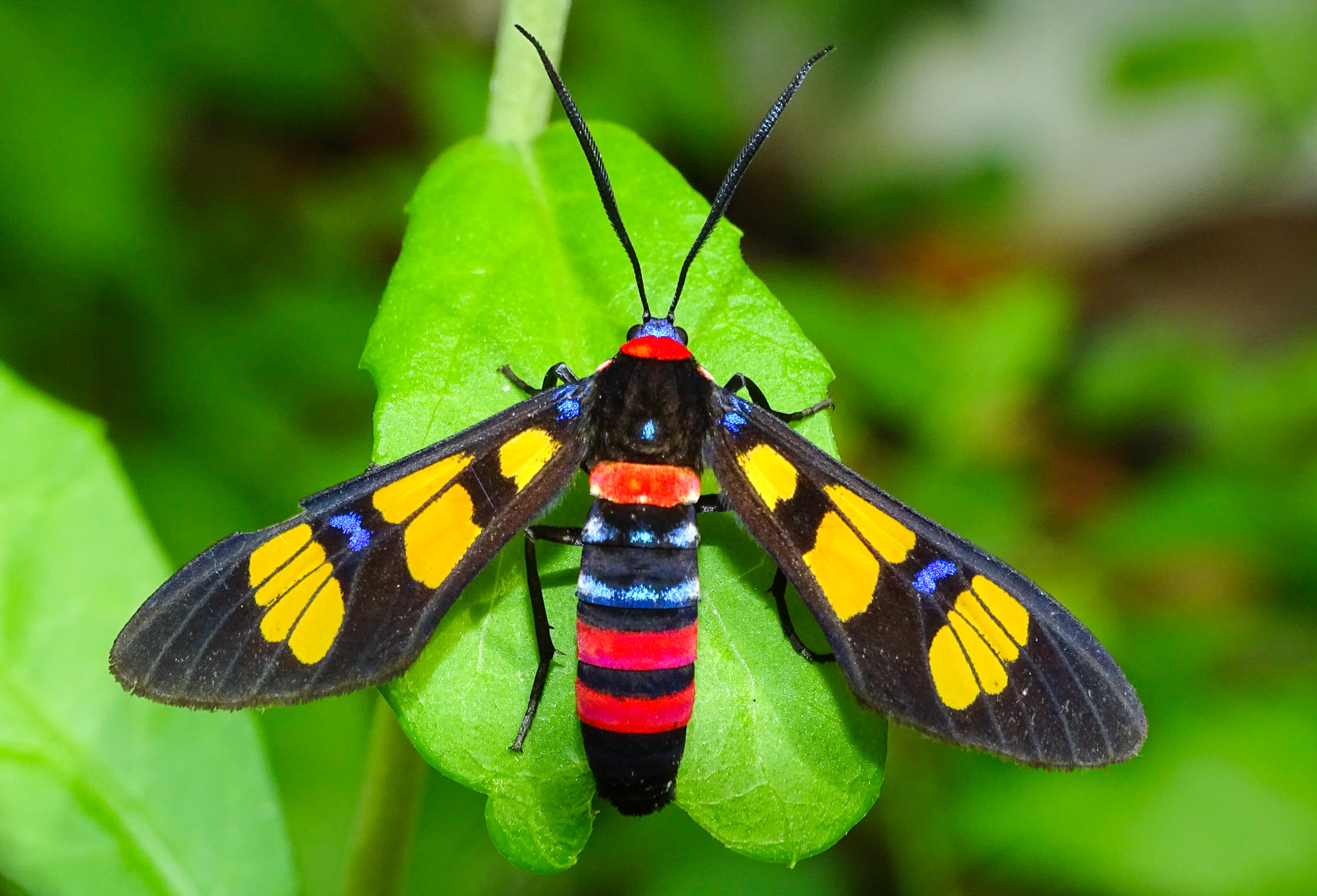

Scientific classification
- Kingdom: Animalia
- Phylum: Arthropoda
- Class: Insecta
- Order: Lepidoptera
- Superfamily: Noctuoidea
- Family: Erebidae
- Subfamily: Arctiinae
- Genus: Euchromia
- Species: E. polymena

Binomial name
- Euchromia polymena (Linnaeus, 1758)

Synonyms
- Sphinx polymena Linnaeus, 1758; Euchromia elegantissima Wallengren, 1861; Euchromia orientalis Butler, 1876; Euchromia fraterna Butler, 1876; Euchromia laura Butler, 1876; Euchromia formosana Butler, 1888; Euchromia celebensis Butler, 1876; Euchromia siamensis Butler, 1876; Glaucopis polymena var. butleri Röber, 1887; Euchromia diffusihelvola Schultze, 1908; Euchromia hainana Seitz, 1913; Euchromia egestosa Seitz, 1913

= Euchromia polymena =

Wasp Moth / Painted Handmaiden Moth

Species of moth

Euchromia polymena is a species of day flying moth of the subfamily Arctiinae. These moths are vibrantly coloured and look like wasps so known as Wasp moth or Painted handmaiden moth. It was described by Carl Linnaeus in his 1758 10th edition of Systema Naturae. It is found in India and south-eastern Asia, as well as on Sumatra, Java, Sulawesi, Peninsular Malaysia, Borneo and the Philippines. It is also present in the northern part of Western Australia and the Northern Territory.

== Description ==
Hindwings have veins 3 and 4 extending from the angle of the cell. The body is black, with a blue spot on the vertex of the head. The frons is white, and the tegulae feature a white spot. The collar and the 1st, 4th, and 5th abdominal segments are crimson, while the 2nd, 3rd, and 6th segments are edged with metallic blue. Forewings have a basal metallic-blue spot and two spots at the end of the cell. They also feature a large sub-basal spot, a bifid medial spot, and a quadrified post-medial orange spot. The hindwing displays trifid basal and quadrified post-medial orange spots. The coxa of the forelegs and three spots on the pectus are white. The larva is reddish with red tubercles. It has long anterior and posterior tufts of hair and shorter dense medial dorsal tufts. Pupa is in a hairy cocoon.

== Ecology ==
The eggs are shiny pale yellow spheres, and laid in groups under a leaf of a food plant. The larvae feed on Ipomoea species. The caterpillars live in groups until the last instar which is solitary.

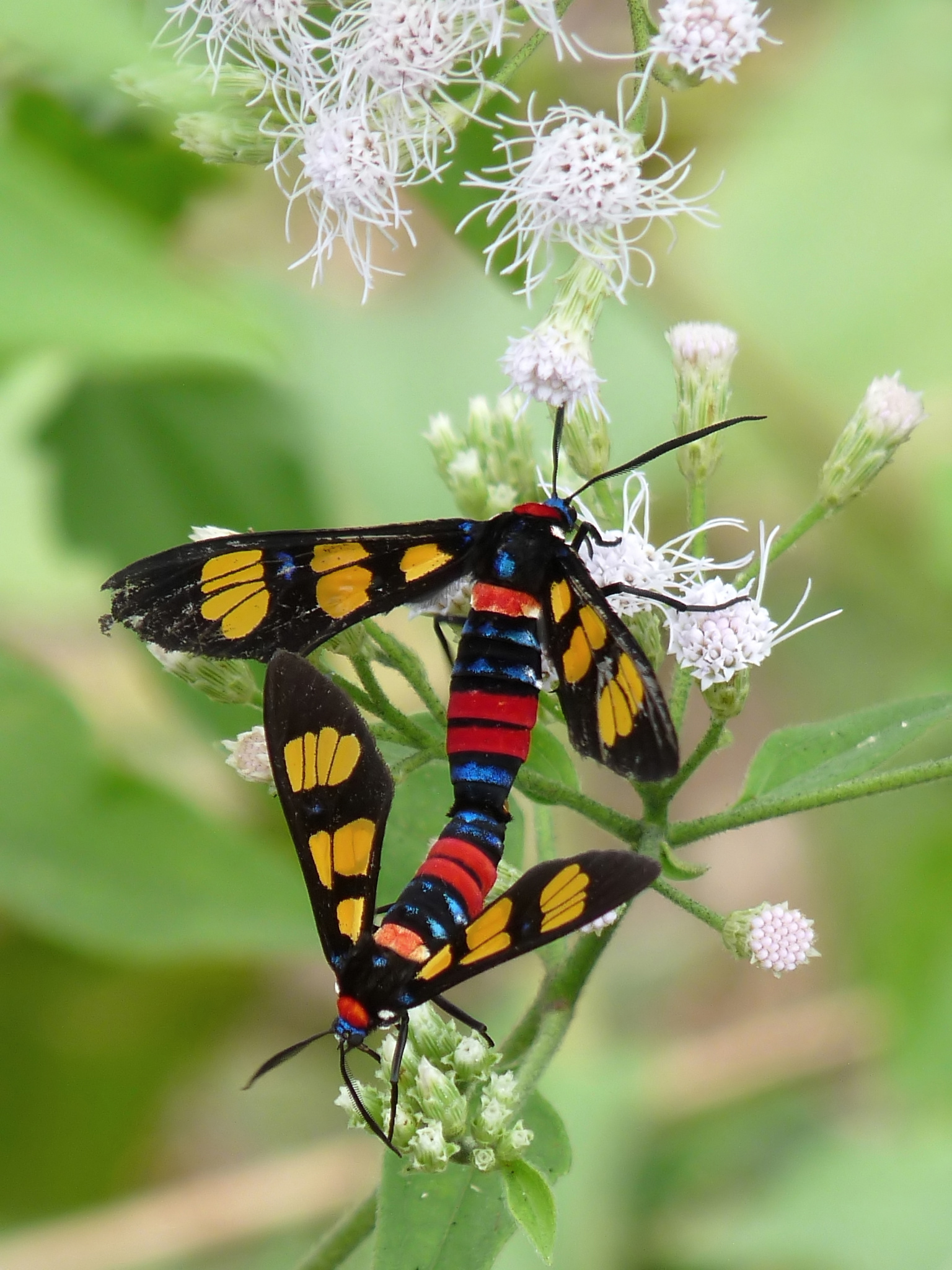
Mating

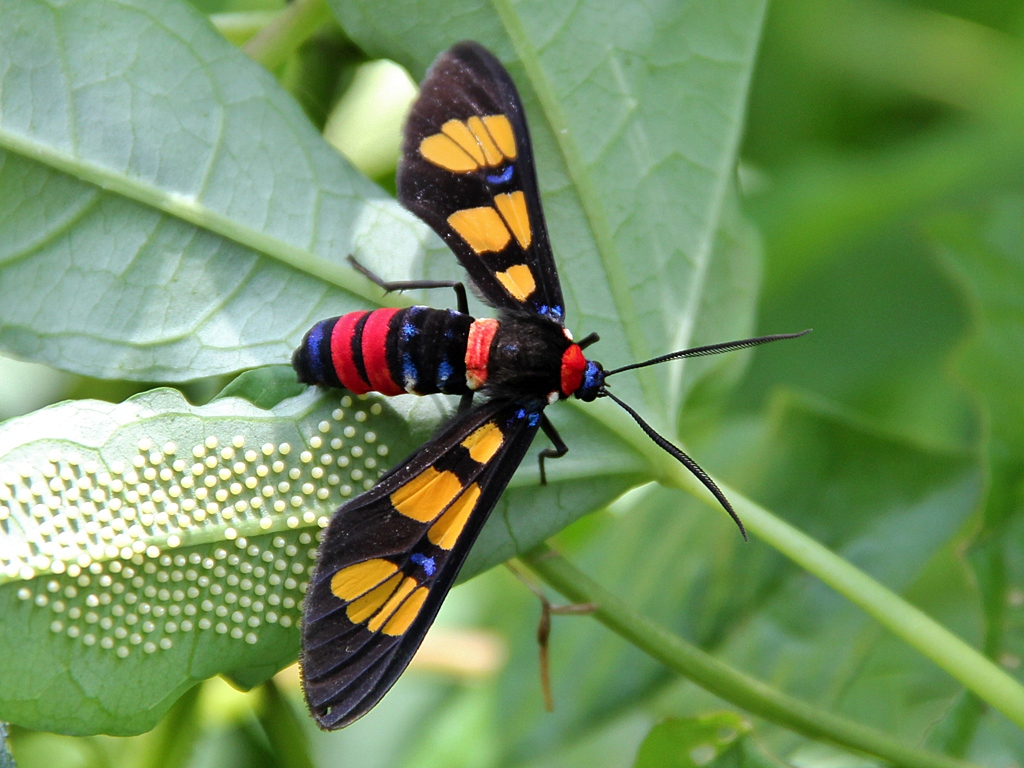
Laying eggs

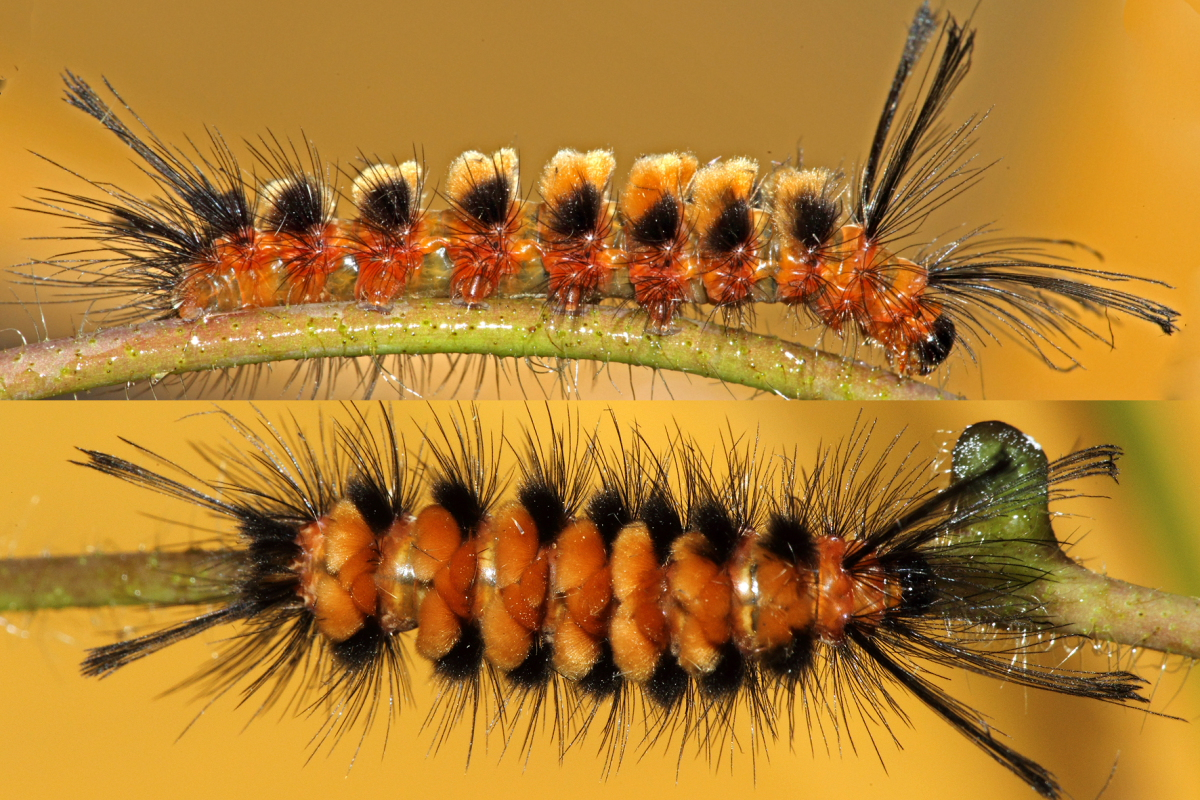
Larva

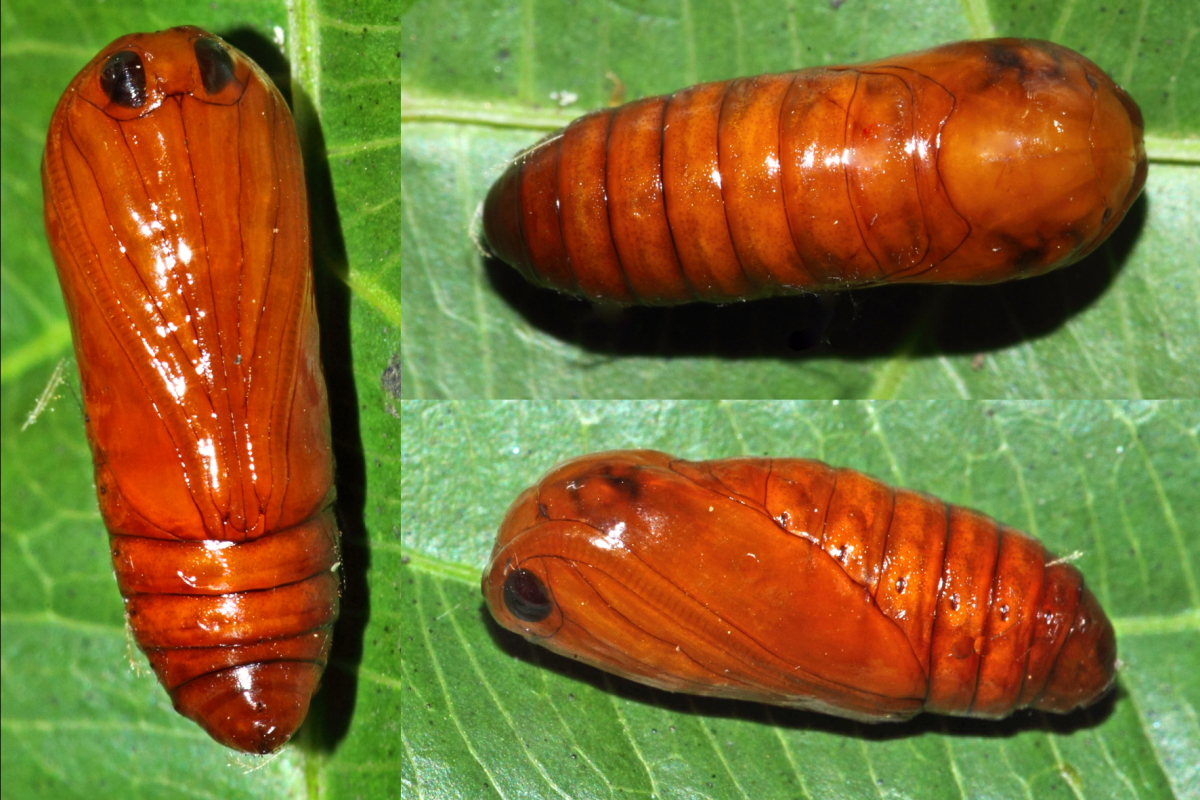
Pupa
