= Euchromia dubia =

Scientific classification
- Domain: Eukaryota
- Kingdom: Animalia
- Phylum: Arthropoda
- Class: Insecta
- Order: Lepidoptera
- Superfamily: Noctuoidea
- Family: Erebidae
- Subfamily: Arctiinae
- Genus: Euchromia
- Species: E. dubia

Binomial name
- Euchromia dubia (Röber, 1887)

Synonyms
- Glaucopis dubia Röber, 1887; Euchromia ekeikei Bethune-Baker, 1908; Euchromia dubia fulgens Lathy, 1899

Species of moth

Euchromia dubia is a moth of the subfamily Arctiinae. It was described by Röber in 1887. It is found on Seram.
