= Euchromia magna =

Scientific classification
- Domain: Eukaryota
- Kingdom: Animalia
- Phylum: Arthropoda
- Class: Insecta
- Order: Lepidoptera
- Superfamily: Noctuoidea
- Family: Erebidae
- Subfamily: Arctiinae
- Genus: Euchromia
- Species: E. magna

Binomial name
- Euchromia magna (C. Swinhoe, 1891)

Synonyms
- Syntomis magna C. Swinhoe, 1891

Species of moth

Euchromia magna is a moth of the subfamily Arctiinae. It was described by Charles Swinhoe in 1891. It is found in India and Sri Lanka.

Hindwings with vein 3 and 4 stalked. Body blue black. Antennae with white distal part. Abdomen with two yellow bands. Forewing with a small sub-basal, two large medial, one sub-apical and two sub-marginal hyaline spots. Hindwings with a large basal hyaline patch crossed by the sub-costal and median veins and a sub-marginal spot crossed by veins 4 and 6.
