= Euchromia madagascariensis =

Scientific classification
- Domain: Eukaryota
- Kingdom: Animalia
- Phylum: Arthropoda
- Class: Insecta
- Order: Lepidoptera
- Superfamily: Noctuoidea
- Family: Erebidae
- Subfamily: Arctiinae
- Genus: Euchromia
- Species: E. madagascariensis

Binomial name
- Euchromia madagascariensis (Boisduval, 1833)

Synonyms
- Glaucopis madagascariensis Boisduval, 1833

Species of moth

Euchromia madagascariensis is a moth of the subfamily Arctiinae. It was described by Jean Baptiste Boisduval in 1833. It is found in Madagascar and South Africa.
