= Euchromia jacksoni =

Scientific classification
- Domain: Eukaryota
- Kingdom: Animalia
- Phylum: Arthropoda
- Class: Insecta
- Order: Lepidoptera
- Superfamily: Noctuoidea
- Family: Erebidae
- Subfamily: Arctiinae
- Genus: Euchromia
- Species: E. jacksoni

Binomial name
- Euchromia jacksoni Bethune-Baker, 1911

Species of moth

Euchromia jacksoni is a species of moth in the subfamily Arctiinae. It is found in Uganda.
