= North Pasco Island =

Island in Tasmania, Australia

Coordinates: 39°55′S 147°46′E

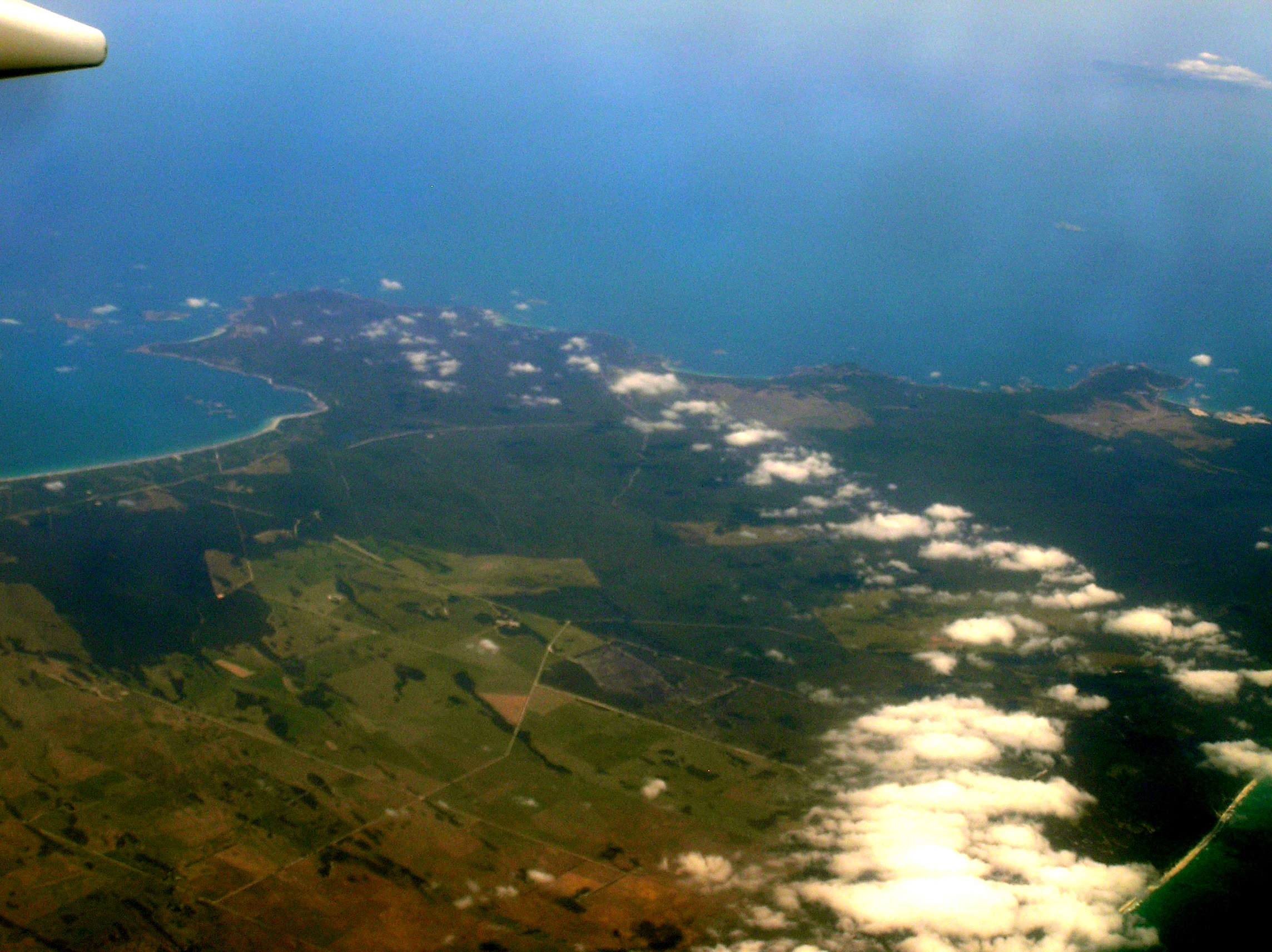
North Pasco is at the very left edge of the top of the photo

North Pasco Island is a granite island, with an area of 28 ha, in south-eastern Australia. It is part of Tasmania’s Pasco Island Group, lying in eastern Bass Strait off the north-west coast of Flinders Island in the Furneaux Group. It was previously used for sheep grazing.

== Fauna ==
Seabirds and waders recorded as breeding on the island include little penguin, short-tailed shearwater, Pacific gull and sooty oystercatcher. Recorded reptiles are White's skink and white-lipped snake.

== See also ==
- List of islands of Tasmania
