= Roydon Island =

Island in Tasmania, Australia

Coordinates: 39°54′S 147°46′E

Roydon Island is an island, with an area of 37 ha, in south-eastern Australia. It is part of Tasmania’s Pasco Island Group, lying in eastern Bass Strait off the north-west coast of Flinders Island in the Furneaux Group.

== Fauna ==
Seabirds and waders recorded as breeding on the island include little penguin, short-tailed shearwater, Pacific gull and sooty oystercatcher. The metallic skink and White's skink are present.

== See also ==
- List of islands of Tasmania
