= Euchromia irius =

Scientific classification
- Domain: Eukaryota
- Kingdom: Animalia
- Phylum: Arthropoda
- Class: Insecta
- Order: Lepidoptera
- Superfamily: Noctuoidea
- Family: Erebidae
- Subfamily: Arctiinae
- Genus: Euchromia
- Species: E. irius

Binomial name
- Euchromia irius (Boisduval, 1832)

Synonyms
- Glaucopis irius Boisduval, 1832; Glaucopis boisduvalii Montrouzier, 1856; Hira aruica Walker, [1865]

Species of moth

Euchromia irius is a moth of the subfamily Arctiinae. It was described by Jean Baptiste Boisduval in 1832. It is found on the Moluccas, Aru and New Guinea.
