= Fisher Island (Tasmania) =

Island in Tasmania, Australia

Coordinates: 40°13′S 148°14′E

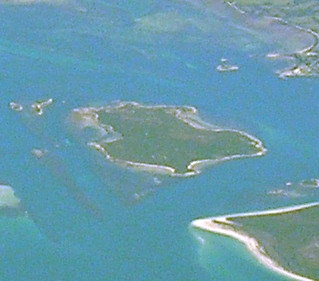
Fisher Island appears above the right end of Little Green Island in this aerial photo.

Fisher Island is a small granite island, with an area of 0.9 ha, in south-eastern Australia. It is part of Tasmania’s Great Dog Island Group, lying in eastern Bass Strait between Flinders and Cape Barren Islands in the Furneaux Group. It is the site of a long-term, ongoing study of short-tailed shearwaters.

== Fauna ==
Apart from the shearwaters, recorded breeding seabird species are little penguin, white-faced storm-petrel, Pacific gull and Caspian tern. The southern grass skink inhabits the island and occasional visits are made by white-lipped snake, lowland copperhead and rakali.

== See also ==
- List of islands of Tasmania
