= Bass Pyramid =

Island in Tasmania, Australia

- Location within Tasmania

Geography
- Location: Bass Strait
- Coordinates: 39°49′12″S 147°14′24″E
- Archipelago: Furneaux Group
- Area: 21,600 m^{2} (233,000 sq ft)
- Length: 220 km (137 mi)
- Width: 140 km (87 mi)

Administration
- Australia
- State: Tasmania

Demographics
- Population: unpopulated

The Bass Pyramid, part of the Furneaux Group, is a small, two sectioned oval, steep-sided 100-square-metre (1,100 sq ft) unpopulated granite island, located in Bass Strait, lying north of the Flinders Island and south of the Kent Group, in Tasmania, Australia. A rock bridge connects the two sections.

The island was used intermittently from the 1940s until 1988 as a bombing and shelling target by the Australian airforce and navy. On 5 April 1978 the island was proclaimed part of a nature reserve.

Recorded breeding seabird and wader species include fairy prion, common diving-petrel, Pacific gull, silver gull, Australasian gannet and sooty oystercatcher. It is also a haul-out site for Australian fur seals. The seals were hunted here in the 19th century. The dangers of the site resulted in at least three sealers losing their lives here.

== See also ==
- List of islands of Tasmania
