= Samphire Island =

Island in Tasmania, Australia

Coordinates: 40°13′S 148°12′E

Samphire Island is a small shell-grit island, with an area of 3.3 ha, in south-eastern Australia. It is part of Tasmania’s Great Dog Island Group, lying in eastern Bass Strait between Flinders and Cape Barren Islands in the Furneaux Group. It is surrounded by mudflats at low tide.

== Flora and fauna ==
The glasswort Sclerostegia arbuscula is dominant around the island's coast.

Recorded breeding seabird and wader species are sooty oystercatcher and pied oystercatcher. The mudflats provide important feeding habitat for migratory waders.

== See also ==
- List of islands of Tasmania
