= Boxen Island =

Island in Tasmania, Australia

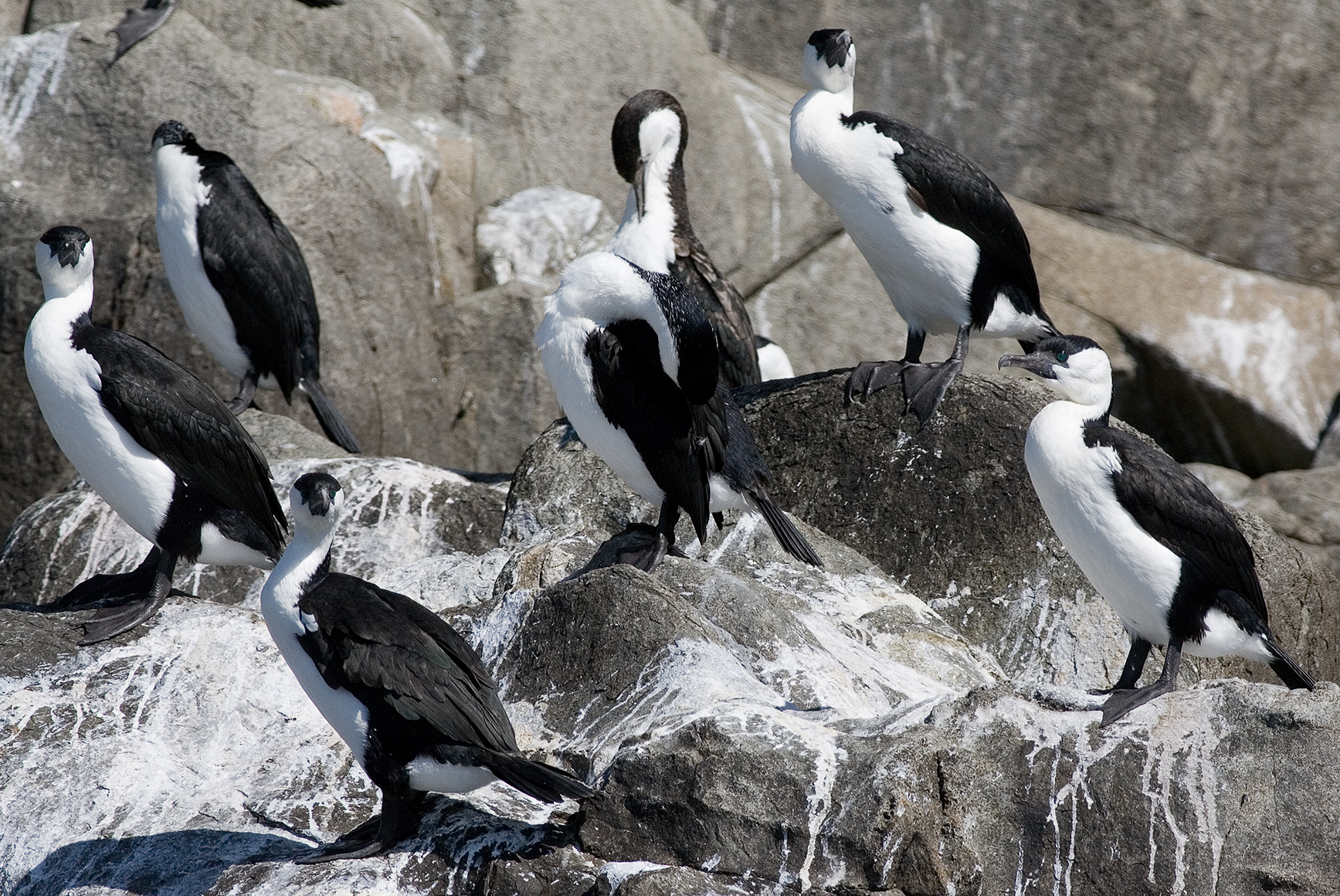
- Boxen Island is an important breeding site for black-faced cormorants

- Location within Tasmania

Geography
- Location: Bass Strait
- Coordinates: 40°22′S 147°53′E
- Archipelago: Long Island Group
- Area: 7 ha (17 acres)

Administration
- Australia
- State: Tasmania

Boxen Island is a flat dolerite island, with an area of 7 ha, in south-eastern Australia. It is part of Tasmania’s Long Island Group, lying in eastern Bass Strait west of Cape Barren Island in the Furneaux Group. Together with nearby Big Black Reef it is classified by BirdLife International as an Important Bird Area because it has been recorded as supporting 288 breeding pairs of black-faced cormorants.

== Flora and fauna ==
As well as black-faced cormorant, recorded breeding seabird, wader and waterbird species include little penguin, Pacific gull, sooty oystercatcher, and grey teal. The metallic skink is present.

== See also ==
- List of islands of Tasmania
