= Key Island =

Island in Tasmania, Australia

Coordinates: 40°26′S 148°01′E

Key Island, with the adjacent Key Reef, is a granite island, with an area of 6 ha, in south-eastern Australia. It is part of Tasmania’s Long Island Group, lying in eastern Bass Strait west of Cape Barren Island in the Furneaux Group. The ketch 'Grace Victoria Holyman' was wrecked near here in Thunder & Lightning Bay in 1897.

== Flora and fauna ==
Recorded breeding seabird and wader species include little penguin, Pacific gull, sooty oystercatcher, white-fronted tern and Caspian tern. The metallic skink is present.

== See also ==
- List of islands of Tasmania
