= Puncheon Island =

Island in Tasmania, Australia

Coordinates: 40°18′S 148°18′E

Puncheon Island is an island, with an area of 17.56 ha, in south-eastern Australia. It is part of Tasmania’s Vansittart Island Group, lying in eastern Bass Strait between Flinders and Cape Barren Islands in the Furneaux Group. It is surrounded by mudflats. It is privately owned and used for farming. It has been extensively burnt and grazed.

== Fauna ==
Recorded breeding seabird and wader species are short-tailed shearwater, Pacific gull and sooty oystercatcher.

== See also ==
- List of islands of Tasmania
