= Little Green Island =

Island in Tasmania, Australia

Coordinates: 40°13′S 148°15′E

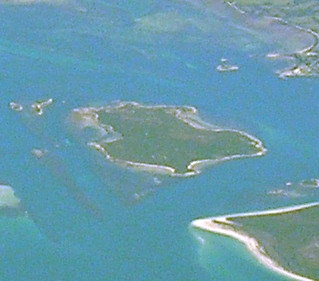
Little Green Island from the east

Little Green Island is a granite island, with an area of 87 hectares (210 acres), in south-eastern Australia. It is part of Tasmania’s Great Dog Island Group, lying in eastern Bass Strait between Flinders and Cape Barren Islands in the Furneaux Group. It is partly a conservation area, and partly private property, used for grazing livestock. The island has been degraded by repeated burning and grazing. Commercial muttonbirding took place until 1957, and recreational muttonbirding since then. The island is part of the Franklin Sound Islands Important Bird Area, identified as such by BirdLife International because it holds over 1% of the world populations of six bird species.

== Flora and fauna ==
The island's vegetation is dominated by tussock grass communities.

Recorded breeding seabird and wader species are little penguin, short-tailed shearwater (600,000 pairs) and sooty oystercatcher. Reptiles present include the metallic skink and tiger snake.

== See also ==
- List of islands of Tasmania
