= Furneaux Group =

Island group in Tasmania, Australia

- Location within Tasmania
- Etymology: Tobias Furneaux

Geography
- Location: Bass Strait
- Coordinates: 40°06′54″S 148°06′54″E
- Total islands: approx. 100
- Major islands: Flinders Island, Cape Barren Island, and Clarke Island
- Area: 2,010.3 km^{2} (776.2 sq mi)

Administration
- Australia
- State: Tasmania
- Local government: Flinders Council

Demographics
- Population: 986 (2021)

The Furneaux Group is a group of approximately 100 islands located at the eastern end of Bass Strait, between Victoria and Tasmania, Australia. The islands were named after British navigator Tobias Furneaux, who sighted the eastern side of these islands after leaving Adventure Bay in 1773 on his way to New Zealand to rejoin Captain James Cook. Navigator Matthew Flinders was the first European to explore the Furneaux Islands group, in the schooner Francis in 1798, and later that year in the sloop Norfolk.

The largest islands in the group are Flinders Island, Cape Barren Island, and Clarke Island. The group contains five settlements: Killiecrankie, Emita, Lady Barron, Cape Barren Island, and Whitemark on Flinders Island, which serves as the administrative centre of the Flinders Council. There are also some small farming properties on the remote islands.

After seals were discovered there in 1798, the Furneaux Group of islands became the most intensively exploited sealing ground in Bass Strait. A total of 29 islands in the Furneaux Group have been found to have some tangible link with sealing in the 19th century.

The Aboriginal matriarch, Dolly Dalrymple, was born on the Furneaux Islands. Her mother was one of two Aboriginal women who had been kidnapped from northern Tasmania by the sealer George Briggs.

King Island, at the western end of Bass Strait, is not a part of the group.

== Islands in the Group ==
Island	Capital	Other cities	Area		Population
Island	Capital	Other cities	km^{2}	sq mi	Population
Furneaux Group	Whitemark	Lady Barron, The Corner, Emita, Killiecrankie	2,010.3	776.2	795
Babel Island Group			5.01	1.93	0
Babel Island			4.4	1.7	0
Cat Island			0.39	0.15	0
Fifty Foot Rock			0.02	0.0077	0
Other			0	0	0
Storehouse Island			0.2	0.077	0
Badger Island Group	Badger Island	Mount Chappell Island	18.15	7.01	3
Badger Island	South East Point		13.5	5.2	1
Goose Island			1.09	0.42	0
Inner Little Goose Island			0.045	0.017	0
Little Badger Island			0.025	0.0097	0
Little Goose Island			0.036	0.014	0
Mount Chappell Island			3.45	1.33	2
Other	Beagle Island	North West Mount Chappell Islet	0.004	0.0015	0
Bass Pyramid	Bass Pyramid		0.025	0.0097	0
Big Green Island Group	Big Green Island	East Kangaroo Island	4.1	1.6	6
Big Green Island			1.57	0.61	4
Chalky Island			0.41	0.16	0
East Kangaroo Island			1.57	0.61	2
Isabella Island			0.14	0.054	0
Little Chalky Island			0.05	0.019	0
Mile Island			0.04	0.015	0
Other			0.14	0.054	0
Cape Barren Island	The Corner		478.4	184.7	67
Clarke Island			82	32	1
Craggy Island	Craggy Island		0.389	0.150	0
Flinders Island	Whitemark	Lady Barron	1,367	528	700
Franklin Sound Islands Important Bird Area	Great Dog	Tin Kettle	21.362	8.248	14
Anderson Island			1.66	0.64	0
Boxen Island			0.13	0.050	0
Briggs Islet			0.034	0.013	0
Doughboy Island			0.17	0.066	0
Great Dog Island	Great Dog Island		3.75	1.45	10
Lady Barron Island			0.01	0.0039	0
Little Anderson Island			0.13	0.050	0
Little Dog Island	Little Dog Island		0.83	0.32	0
Little Green Island			0.87	0.34	0
Long Island			3.13	1.21	0
Neds Reef			0.04	0.015	0
Other	Spences Islands	Big Black Reef, GVH Rock, Mid Woody Islet, Ram, Apple Orchard Point, Billy Goat Reefs, Fisher Island, Samphire Island	0.253	0.098	0
Oyster Rocks	East Oyster	West Oyster	0.07	0.027	0
Pelican Island			0.07	0.027	0
Puncheon Island	Puncheon Island		0.185	0.071	1
Tin Kettle Island	Tin Kettle		1.86	0.72	2
Vansittart Island	Bates Bay	House Bay	8.17	3.15	1
Inner Sister Island			7.48	2.89	0
Other	Little Island	Shag Rock	0	0	0
Outer Sister Island	Outer Sister Island		5.45	2.10	0
Pasco Island Group	Roydon Island		1.1	0.42	0
Marriott Reef			0.034	0.013	0
Middle Pasco Islands			0.084	0.032	0
North Pasco Island			0.28	0.11	0
Other			0.122	0.047	0
Roydon Island			0.37	0.14	0
South Pasco Island			0.21	0.081	0
Passage Island Group	Passage Island		4.47	1.73	2
Forsyth Island			1.67	0.64	0
Gull Island			0.085	0.033	0
Low Islets			0.02	0.0077	0
Moriarty Rocks			0.025	0.0097	0
Other	Battery Island		0.017	0.0066	0
Passage Island	Passage Island		2.53	0.98	2
Spike Island	Spike Island	Little Spike Island	0.123	0.047	0
Preservation Island Group	Preservation Island		2.37	0.92	2
Key Island			0.06	0.023	0
Night Island			0.026	0.010	0
Other			0.007	0.0027	0
Preservation Island	Preservation Island	Horseshoe Bay	2.08	0.80	2
Rum Island			0.197	0.076	0
Prime Seal Island Group	Prime Seal Island		12.8	4.9	0
Bird Island			0.015	0.0058	0
Low Islets	South Low	Middle Low, North Low	0.35	0.14	0
Other			0.075	0.029	0
Prime Seal Island	Peacock Bay	South Bay	12.2	4.7	0
Wybalenna Island			0.16	0.062	0
Sentinel Island			0.1	0.039	0
Wright Rock			0.094	0.036	0
Furneaux Group	Whitemark	Lady Barron, The Corner, Emita, Killiecrankie	2,010.3	776.2	795

== Geology ==
The islands contain granite from the Devonian period, as well as unconsolidated limestone and sand from Cenozoic periods. During the last ice age, a land bridge joined Tasmania to the Australian mainland through this group of islands.

== See also ==
- Furneaux bioregion
- Engaeus martigener
- List of islands of Tasmania
