= Goose Island =

Goose Island may refer to:

== Places ==
=== Australia ===
- Goose Island (South Australia), a small rocky island lying off Wardang Island, west of the Yorke Peninsula
  - Goose Island Conservation Park, a protected area
  - Goose Island Aquatic Reserve, a marine protected area
- Goose Island (Tasmania), part of the Badger Group of the Furneaux Islands
  - Little Goose Island
  - Inner Little Goose Island
- Two islands in Western Australia
  - Goose Island, north of Middle Island, south-east of Esperance
  - Goose Island, off the Nornalup Inlet

=== United States ===
==== New York State ====
- Goose Island (Bronx, NY), an island in the Hutchinson River in the New York City borough of the Bronx, part of Pelham Bay Park
- Goose Island (Long Island Sound), a small, private island and part of the city of New Rochelle, New York
- Goose Island, New York, a community in Washington County

==== Other states ====
- Goose Island (Chicago), Illinois
- Goose Island (Connecticut), an island in the Housatonic River in Stratford
- Goose Island (District of Columbia), a vanishing island located in the Potomac River
- Goose Island (Guilford), an uninhabited island in Long Island Sound, off of the coast of Connecticut
- Goose Island (Michigan), an island in Lake Huron
- Goose Island (Montana), an island in Flathead Lake
- Goose Island (San Juan Islands), Washington
- Goose Island State Park, state park near Rockport, Texas

== Organizations ==
- Goose Island Brewery, an American beverage company
