= Chalky Island =

Chalky Island may refer to:

- Chalky Island (New Zealand)
- Chalky Island (Tasmania)
- Little Chalky Island, Tasmania
