= Inner Little Goose Island =

Island in Tasmania, Australia

- Location within Tasmania

Geography
- Location: Bass Strait
- Coordinates: 40°17′S 147°47′E
- Archipelago: Badger Group, part of the Furneaux Group
- Area: 4.5 ha (11 acres)

Administration
- Australia
- State: Tasmania

The Inner Little Goose Island, part of the Badger Group within the Furneaux Group, is a 4.5-hectare (11-acre) unpopulated small, round granite island, located in Bass Strait between Goose and Little Goose islands, lying west of the Flinders and Cape Barren islands, Tasmania, south of Victoria, in south-eastern Australia. The island is contained within a conservation area and is part of the Chalky, Big Green and Badger Island Groups Important Bird Area.

== Fauna ==
Recorded breeding seabird and wader species are little penguin, short-tailed shearwater, Pacific gull and sooty oystercatcher. The eastern three-lined skink is present.

== See also ==
- List of islands of Tasmania
