= A. D. Edwardes =

Teacher, nautical enthusiast and photographer in South Australia

Arthur Diedrich Edwardes (1905–1970), better known as A. D. Edwardes, was a teacher, working in South Australia and the Northern Territory, who had a lifelong interest in sailing ships, particularly those of the grain race. He took photographs and wrote articles on such nautical subjects. With the assistance of his brother Allan Rowland Edwardes (c.1911—1990) and others, he assembled what is now known as the A. D. Edwardes Collection of photographs. Some of the photographs are his own work, but many were given to him by others whom he knew. Upon his death, he bequeathed the collection of around 8,000 images to the State Library of South Australia. Three other photographs taken by him are included in the Port Victoria Collection, another collection of the same library, and another one is in the collection of the Australian National Maritime Museum.

== Family background, early life, and Port Victoria ==
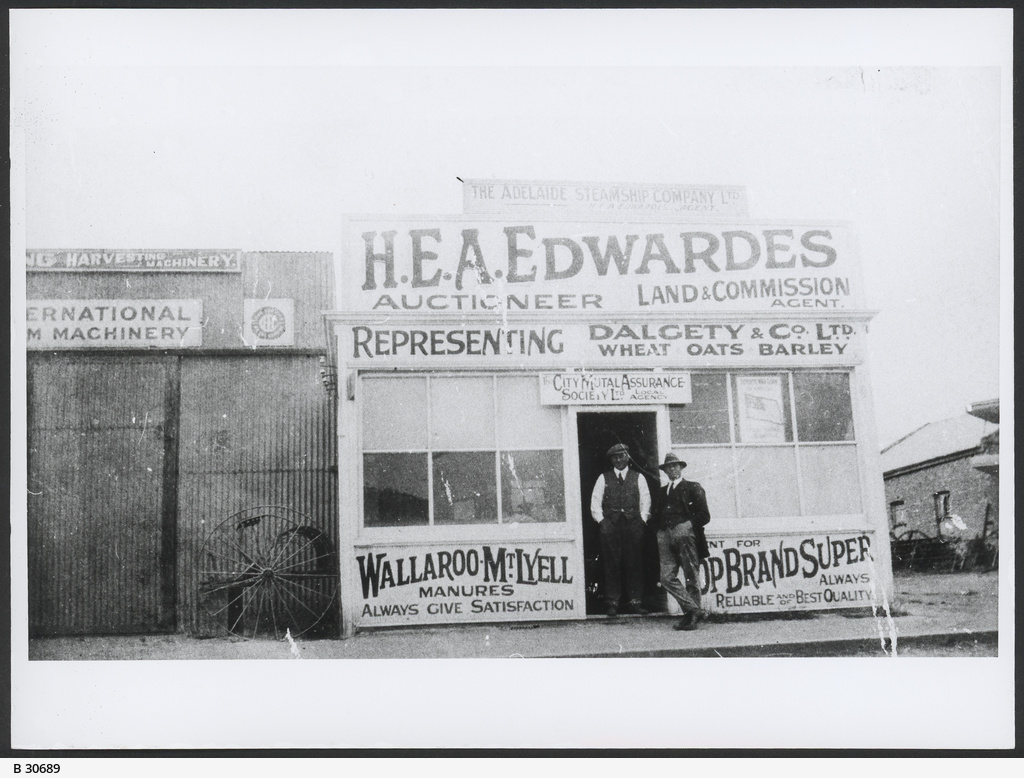
Edwardes's father's business in Port Victoria, c.1910. (State Library of South Australia)

Arthur Diedrich Edwardes was born on 24 May 1905. He was the eldest son of the eight children of Henry Edmund Arthur Edwardes and Maria Mahnke. His father had been a bank manager, but around 1910 operated a rural agency business. Known publicly as A.D. Edwardes, his nickname, among his family and friends was 'Bon'.

Edwardes spent the years of his childhood in Port Victoria. a town on the western coastline of the Yorke Peninsula, on Spencer Gulf. The town was a port of the grain race, which was the last seabourne trade that was economic to operate using sailing ships.

Always a small port township, its street plan was then even less extensive in area than it is now.

During Edwardes's lifetime, the port was visited by many well-known sailing ships of the time, bringing with them their crews from various European nations, such a Germany, France, Belgium, and Finland. The port was a shallow one, and needed a long jetty to allow ketches to be used as lighters, to ferry the grain to the ships anchored in deeper water. Ketches and small steamers also brought bagged grain, from other smaller ports and landings, to Port Victoria, where it was transshipped to ocean-going vessels.

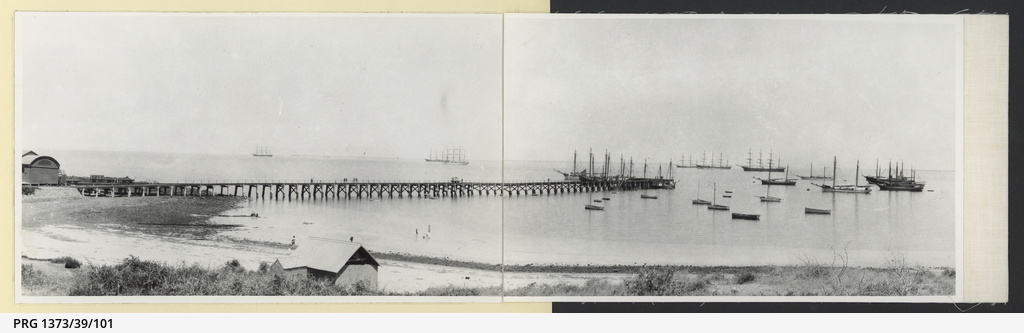
Shipping at Port Victoria in 1934 (A. D. Edwardes Collection) Left Panel. Four-masted barques Priwall, Pamir, and Viking. Right Panel. Ketches (see Mosquito Fleet) at jetty. Barque Penang, four-masted barques Pommern and Archibald Russell.

Edwardes was involved in the community life of Port Victoria, as vice-captain of the local football team and secretary of its club, and through his involvement in amateur theatre. He had ambitions to join the Royal Australian Navy, but was rejected due to poor eyesight. Edwardes left Port Victoria, in mid 1927, to attend the Education Department's Training College. He was given a public farewell.

His sister, Meme Gwenyth, known as Gwenyth, was one of the few women to have gone around Cape Horn under sail, aboard L'Avenir, in 1937.

His brother Allan Rowland Edwardes (c.1911—1990) remained in the district running a business. He became harbourmaster of Port Victoria, from 1946 until 1952, and so was harbourmaster during the last sailing season of the grain race (1948–1949). He was also the part-time harbourmaster of Tumby Bay from 1963.

In 1949, Pamir and Passat, setting out from Port Victoria for Europe and carrying grain, made the final commercial sailing voyage in the world, by ships without auxiliary engines. Both ships are credited; although Passat left Port Victoria four days later, she overtook Pamir on the way to Cape Horn. Although trade at the port had declined, after the interruption of WWII—only four sailing ships visited the port in 1948-1949—it was the death of Finnish shipowner, Gustav Erikson (1872–1947), that preceded its final end. Although Gustav's son, Edgar, tried to continue, it proved uneconomic to do so. The shipping of wheat as a bulk commodity, instead of in sacks, doomed the remaining jetty operations. Port Victoria now has an economy largely based on tourism, holiday accommodation, recreational fishing, and diving.

== Career and other interests ==
=== Teacher ===
In April 1928, Edwardes was appointed to teach at Keith. However, in August 1928, he was appointed as the head teacher of the school on Wardang Island—an island in Spencer Gulf around 10 km from Port Victoria—bringing him back closer to his home town.

In 1930, he was appointed as the head teacher at Cockburn. In August 1932, he was appointed to Mitcham, an outer suburb of Adelaide. From 1936 to 1941, he taught at Tennant Creek, then being appointed to Challa Gardens school in December 1941. In 1943, the electoral roll listed him as a teacher living at Glenunga, a suburb of Adelaide that was previously part of an area known as Knoxville. He was still living there in 1952.

Although he lived away from Port Victoria for much of his adulthood, he had family connections to the area and returned there on numerous occasions. In early 1954, he was once again living in Port Victoria, possibly already in retirement.

=== Nautical enthusiast ===
Edwards shared a lifelong interest in shipping, with his younger brother Allan. He himself stated that his interest had been aroused, one night in March 1913, when he witnessed the events after a ketch, Black Albatross, struck Eclipse Reef, just off Port Victoria, during a gale. A letter to the 'Notes and Queries' section of The Register, in January 1921, is probably his first published writing on a nautical subject; in it he defended the reputation and safety of Port Victoria.

His collection of photographs was begun during his teenage years. He learnt photography and how to develop and print his photographs, so that he could swap photographs with other nautical enthusiasts.

He made many acquaintances through his interest, including members of ships' crews that visited Port Victoria. By 1925, he had begun "voluminous correspondence" with people from Australia and around the world, exchanging photographs and seeking information. Among those with whom he corresponded were the poet, John Masefield, and the composer, Percy Grainger. Masefield had spent the years from 1891 to 1895, as a young sailor aboard sailing ships, including HMS Conway (a training ship) and Gilcruix. Granger had arrived in Port Victoria, in January 1934, as a passenger from Europe aboard L'Avinir, and he was photographed climbing the ship's rigging. In 1932, Edwardes was sent an autographed photograph of the sailing ship and WWI German raider, Seeadler, by its wartime commander, Count Felix von Luckner, known as Der Seeteufel (the Sea Devil), who was another with whom Edwardes corresponded.

During the 1930s, Edwardes wrote articles for newspapers, covering subjects such as the wreck of Star of Greece, near Port Willunga, Wardang Island, in Spencer Gulf—the scene of numerous groundings and shipwrecks, later the site of experiments for biological control of feral rabbits—and the end of the full-rigged ship, Grace Harwar. Most of the articles appeared in a weekly newspaper, The Chronicle (Adelaide), and in 1933, four of his photographs of the later years of the grain race ships, at Port Victoria, were published in that newspaper. He contributed photographs for other publications, such as to Pix in 1946.

In 1947, he was a competitor in a quiz that was broadcast on radio. In 1950, he was co-curator of the Port Adelaide Nautical Museum. During the 1950s, he wrote two articles for Walkabout magazine, which were illustrated using photographs that he either took or were from his collection.

In 1963, suffering from what appeared to be a terminal disease, he decided to leave his collection of photographs to the State Library of South Australia. After unexpectedly recovering, he spent the next five years collating his collection with the help of library staff.

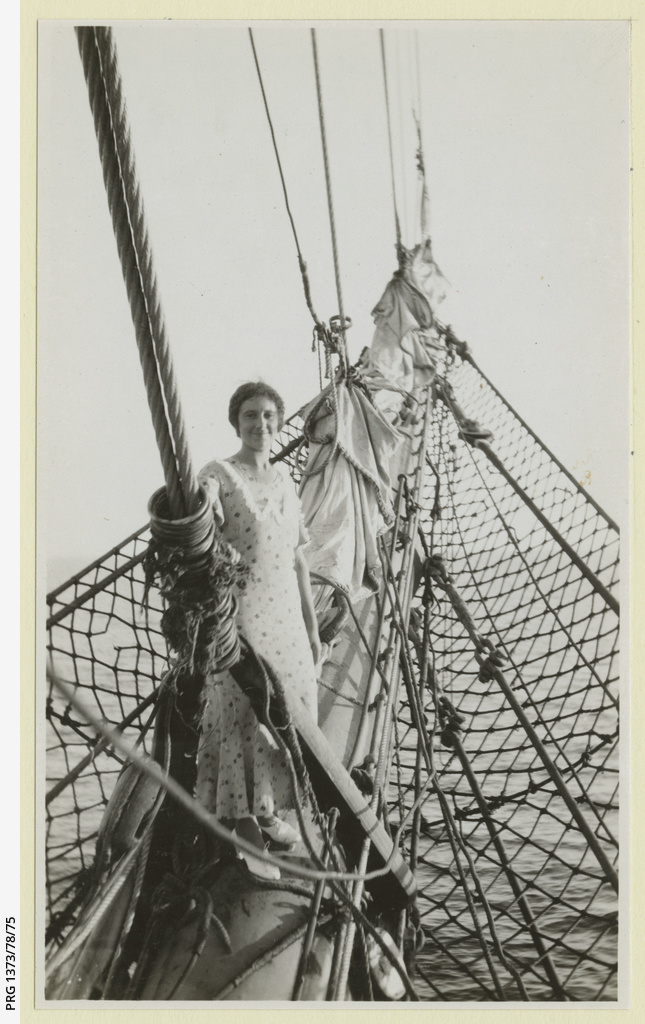
Edwardes's wife Rena, standing on the bowsprit of Priwall.

== Family ==
In January 1932, he married Rena Clavering Tuckwell. Rena was originally from Dunedin, New Zealand, but later was from Kew, in Melbourne. She had been visiting Port Victoria, where her aunt and uncle lived, from at latest 1926. In 1927–1928, she was the principal of the Rena Clavering School of Physical Culture in Dunedin. She and Edwardes performed together in an amateur theatrical production at Port Victoria in January 1931.

They had a daughter, Lynette, and two sons together.

== Death ==
Edwardes died on 24 September 1970. His remains are buried at the Centennial Park Cemetery, and he is commemorated by a stone tablet at his parents' grave site in Port Victoria Cemetery.

== Legacy ==
His principal legacy is the A. D. Edwardes Collection of photographs. The State Library of South Australia describes the collection as follows, "Records comprising 91 volumes of photographs of ships, organised under type of ship, or ownership, and with basic caption information. The volumes were compiled by shipping enthusiast Arthur Edwardes, using original prints if available, but most commonly copy prints." Around 30% of the collection has been digitised, and it is planned to complete that task progressively. The collection contains around 8,000 images.

Some of the photographs were taken by Edwardes himself—his brother Allan would inform him that particular ships were in port—but most were provided by others, from Australia and throughout the world, who knew that Edwardes was assembling a large collection of photographs. Most photographs in the collection date from before Edwardes began collecting, and many precede his birth. The collection contains photographs ranging in date from as early as c.1845 to as late as 1950.

The majority of the images are of iron and steel hulled sailing ships, the type most associated with the South Australian grain trade. There are also images of other kinds of vessels, particularly those seen in South Australian ports such as Port Victoria, Port Adelaide, Wallaroo, Victor Harbor, Port Augusta, and Port Lincoln. There are also images of other Australian ports, including Melbourne and Sydney, and of overseas ports, and numerous photographs of ships' figureheads.

Photographs from the collection were used to illustrate a book, Sail in the South, published in 1975. The book contains a photograph of Edwardes.

Three photographs of ships taken by Edwardes, in 1937, are included in the Port Victoria Collection, another collection held by the State Library of South Australia, and another one is in the collection of the Australian National Maritime Museum. He had input to what is now the Port Victoria Maritime Museum, which occupies an 1878-vintage former cargo shed adjacent to the jetty at Port Victoria.

Of the many ships that are portrayed in the A. D. Edwardes Collection, only Passat, Pommern, Viking, Moshulu, and Glenlee (a.k.a. Ilsamount, Clarastella, or Galatea), remain afloat; all are permanently moored now. Cutty Sark exists but is landlocked, at Greenwich. The 146 year old Falls of Clyde—the last surviving iron-hulled, four-masted, fully square-rigged ship—was scuttled at sea in October 2025.

Edwardes did much to document the shipwrecks around Wardang Island, now regarded as a prime diving location.

The road running closest to the sea at Port Victoria is named Edwardes Terrace, apparently after one or more of the Edwardes family.

== See also ==
- Alan Villiers
- Gustaf Erikson
- Mosquito Fleet (South Australia)
- The Last Grain Race
- Port Victoria Maritime Museum
