= Port Victoria Maritime Museum =

Australian maritime museum

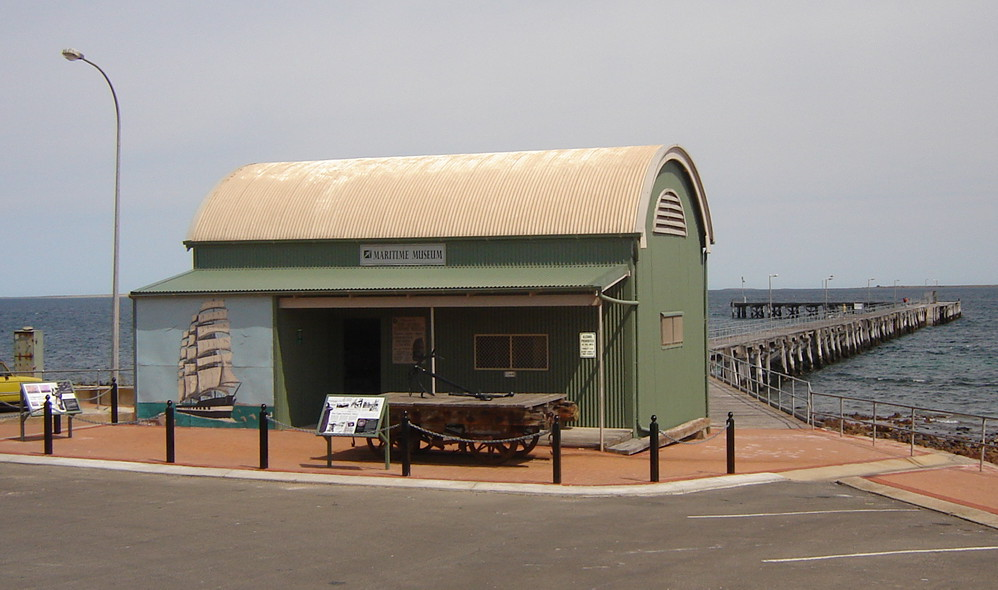
- Port Victoria Maritime Museum and Jetty

- Location within South Australia
- Location: Port Victoria, South Australia, Australia
- Coordinates: 34°29′46″S 137°28′56″E
- Type: maritime history
- Accreditation: registered with History SA
- Website: Port Victoria Maritime Museum

The Port Victoria Maritime Museum is a maritime museum located in South Australia, located on the west coast of the Yorke Peninsula in Port Victoria. It is housed in a cargo shed that was brought out from the United Kingdom in kit form in 1877 and completed in January 1878. Household goods for the early settlers in the town and surrounding farmlands were brought by steamers from Port Adelaide and stored in the cargo shed until the settlers' homes were completed.

== Overview ==
The first overseas sailing ship to arrive at Port Victoria was the Cardigan Castle. It loaded 1800 tons of bagged grain and sailed to Europe in February 1879. By 1883, 23 sailing ships (windjammers) had anchored in the bay between Wardang Island and the mainland, some visiting more than once. This was the beginning of the bagged grain trade between the Spencer Gulf ports and the markets of Europe. The town relied on the grain trade. Farmers, grain agents, lumpers (the men who handled the bagged grain), and their families were vital to this.

From November onwards, the town bustled with activity as the grain was harvested and brought into the town. The bags of grain were built into huge stacks around the town to await the arrival of the sailing ships. When the ships arrived, the bags were taken down the jetty and loaded onto small ketches and schooners which took the grain to the large ships at anchor in the bay. The present-day museum has photographs, exhibits, and DVD presentations highlighting these times.

Many of the sailing ships which came to Port Victoria in late 1920 sailed under the flag of Finland. The largest fleet of ships was owned by Gustaf Erikson, whose home port was Mariehamn on the island of Åland in Finland. With so many of his ships regularly visiting Port Victoria, the town became known to them as the Mariehamn of the South. In 1934, there were only 26 commercial sailing ships left in the world and 17 of them came to Port Victoria during that year.

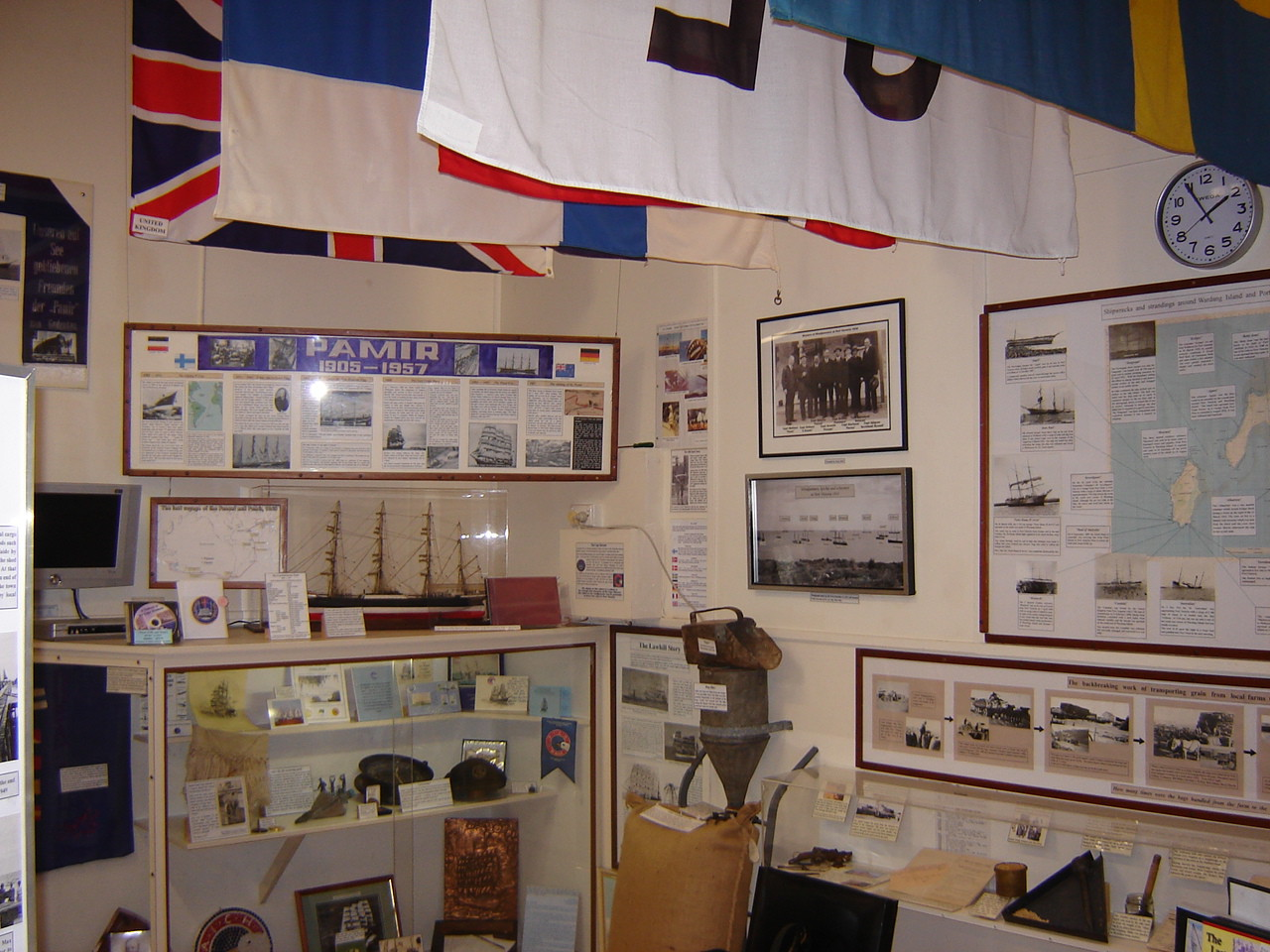
Some of the exhibits inside the museum

Cape Horner Sign at Port Victoria Maritime Museum

The visits to these sailing ships and the life at sea of the crews are documented in the present-day museum. The journey from the port to Europe was eastwards in the Roaring Forties and Furious Fifties via Cape Horn. Voyages took anything between the record-breaking 83 days by the Parma in 1933 to over five months – depending on the ship, weather conditions, and the skills of the captains and crews.

The sailors who rounded Cape Horn were known as Cape Horner. Cape Horner Associations were set up in many countries around the world. The museum has signage and displays paying tribute to the Cape Horners and the Australian Cape Horners in particular. The era of sailing ships ended in 1949 when the Pamir and Passat made the final commercial sailing voyage in the world by ships without auxiliary engines.

The museum is known for its displays of shipwreck artifacts from around Wardang Island. The Wardang Island Maritime Heritage Trail exists on the sites of eight of the shipwrecks.

The First Encounters Display provides information on the local Narungga indigenous people and their culture, the charting of the Spencer Gulf by Matthew Flinders and Nicholas Baudin, as well as the setting up of the large sheep pastoral leases on the Yorke Peninsula in the nineteenth century.

== See also ==
- A. D. Edwardes
