= Big Green Island =

Island in Tasmania, Australia

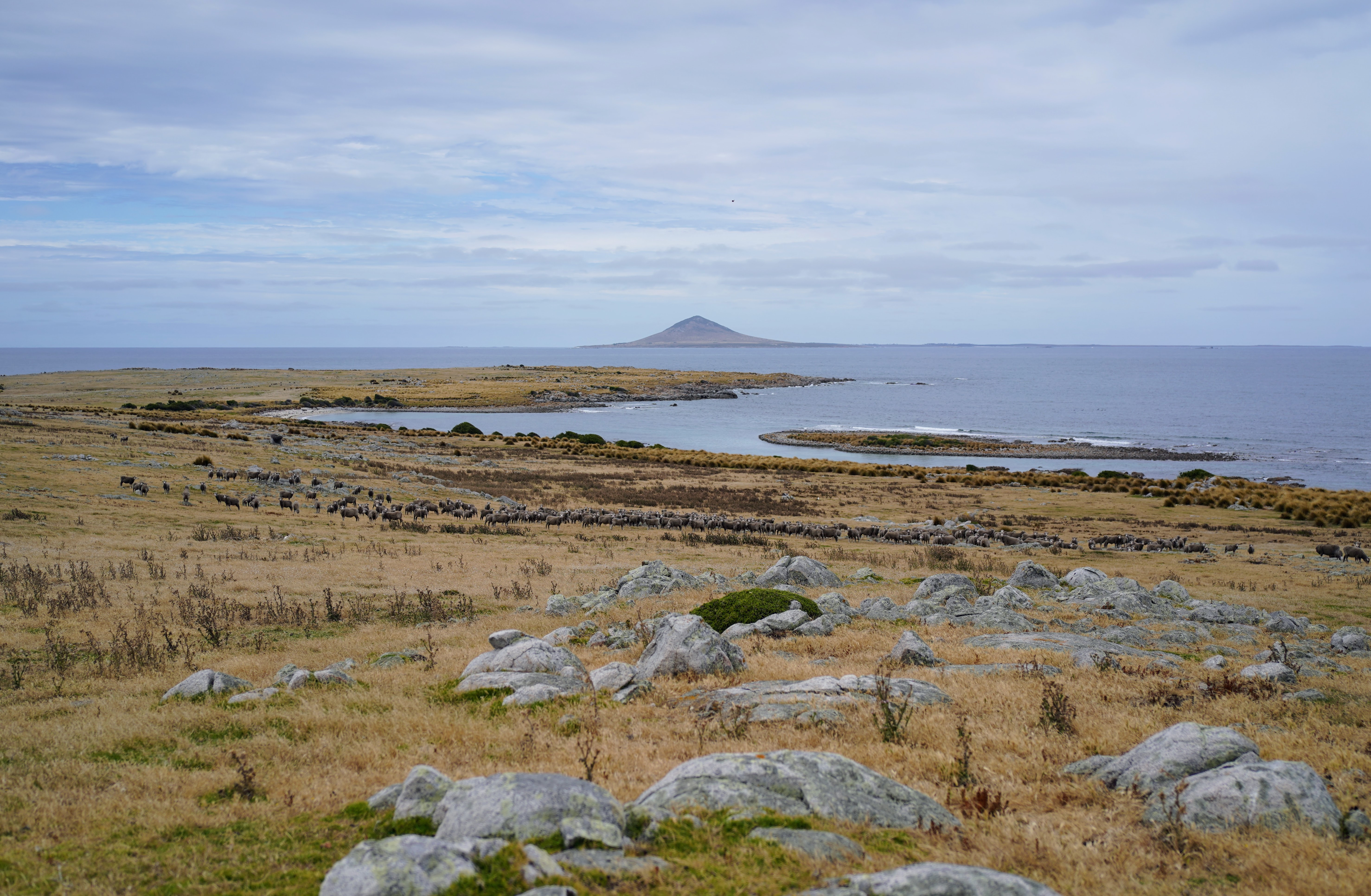
- An image of Big Green Island facing towards Mount Chappell Island with a flock of sheep in the foreground.

- Location within Tasmania

Geography
- Location: Bass Strait
- Coordinates: 40°10′48″S 147°58′12″E
- Archipelago: Big Green Group, part of the Furneaux Group
- Area: 122 ha (300 acres)

Administration
- Australia
- State: Tasmania

The Big Green Island, part of the Big Green Group within the Furneaux Group, is a 122-hectare (300-acre) granite island with limestone and dolerite outcrops, located in Bass Strait west of Flinders Island, in Tasmania, in south-eastern Australia. The island is partly contained within a nature reserve with the rest being used for farming; and is part of the Chalky, Big Green and Badger Island Groups Important Bird Area.

Besides the Big Green Island, other islands that comprise the Big Green Group include the Chalky, East Kangaroo, Isabella, Little Chalky and Mile islands.

== Fauna ==
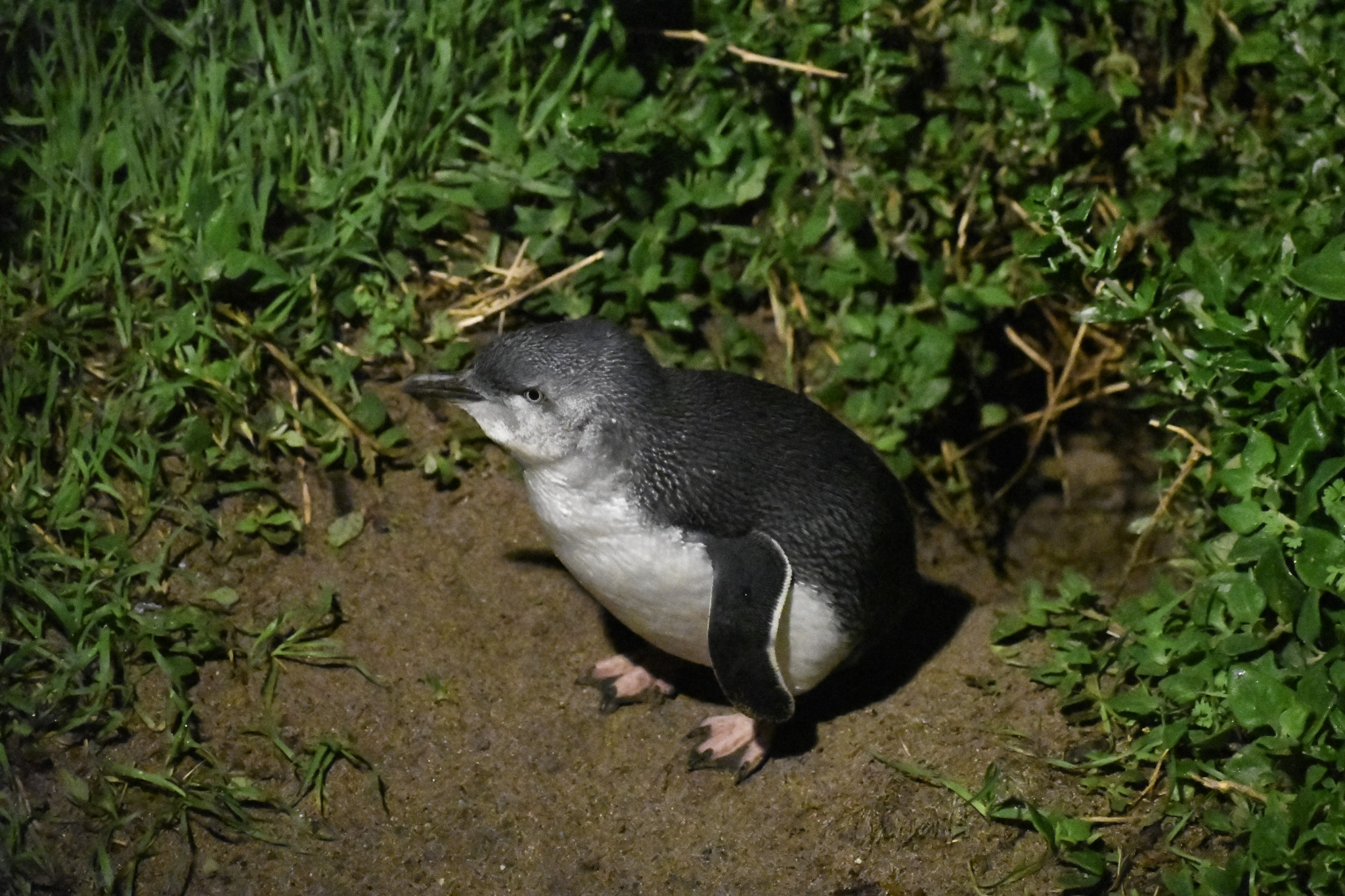
Little penguin (Eudyptula minor) on nearby Phillip Island

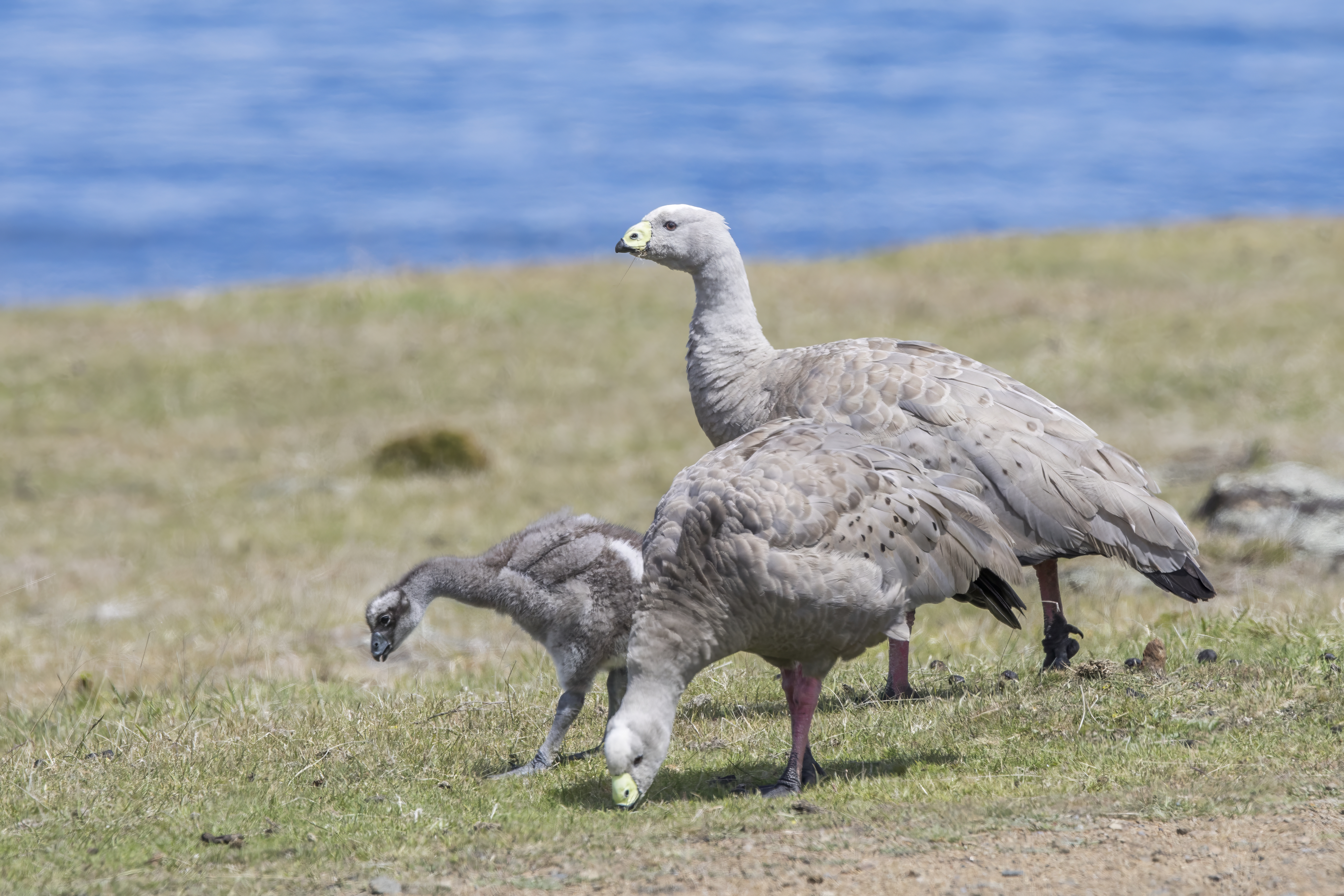
Cape Barren goose (Cereopsis novaehollandiae) breeding pair with juvenile on Maria Island.

Recorded breeding seabird and wader species are the little penguin, short-tailed shearwater, Pacific gull, silver gull, sooty oystercatcher, pied oystercatcher, black-faced cormorant and Caspian tern. Cape Barren geese also breed on the island. Reptiles present include the metallic skink and Bougainville's skink.

Black rats were eradicated from the island in 2016.

A high-resolution panorama photo of Big Green Island, taken from the southern end of the hill in the centre of the island.

A high-resolution panorama photo of Big Green Island in Tasmania, taken from the northern end of the island's central ridge. Two houses and a shearing shed are visible.

== See also ==
- List of islands of Tasmania
