= Goose Island Aquatic Reserve =

Marine protected area in South Australia

- IUCN category II (national park)
- Location within South Australia
- Location: South Australia
- Nearest city: Port Victoria
- Coordinates: 34.4548°S 137.3619°E
- Area: 51 ha (130 acres)
- Established: 1 December 1971
- Governing body: Primary Industries and Regions SA (PIRSA)

Goose Island Aquatic Reserve is a marine protected area in the Australian state of South Australia located in waters adjoining the following island located in Spencer Gulf immediately north of Wardang Island and west of the town of Port Victoria - Goose Island, Little Goose Island and White Rock Island.

It was declared on 30 November 1971 to provide “a conservation area where teaching institutions may conduct classes and scientific research on marine biology and ecology and to protect the habitat of the seal colony situated on White Rocks”. Activities such as fishing and the collection or removal of any marine organism is prohibited, while the following activities are permitted - use of boats, swimming, snorkelling and scuba diving. The aquatic reserve covered all of the waters within a 100 metres (330 feet) of Goose Island, Little Goose Island and White Rock Island.

Since 2012, it has been located within the boundaries of a “sanctuary zone” within the Eastern Spencer Gulf Marine Park.

The aquatic reserve is classified as an IUCN Category II protected area.

== See also ==
- Protected areas of South Australia
- Goose Island (disambiguation)
