= Isabella Island =

Island in Tasmania, Australia

- Location within Tasmania

Geography
- Location: Bass Strait
- Coordinates: 40°07′48″S 147°56′24″E
- Archipelago: Big Green Group, part of the Furneaux Group
- Area: 11.4 ha (28 acres)

Administration
- Australia
- State: Tasmania

Demographics
- Population: unpopulated

The Isabella Island, part of the Big Green Group within the Furneaux Group, is a 11.4-hectare (28-acre) unpopulated granite island, located in the Bass Strait, west of the Flinders Island and south of Chalky Island, in Tasmania, in south-eastern Australia. The island is a nature reserve and is part of the Chalky, Big Green and Badger Island Groups Important Bird Area.

== Fauna ==
Recorded breeding seabird and wader species are little penguin, Pacific gull, sooty oystercatcher and pied oystercatcher. Cape Barren geese also breed there. Reptiles present include the metallic skink, White's skink and white-lipped snake.

== See also ==
- List of islands of Tasmania
