= Goose Island Lighthouse =

Lighthouse in Tasmania, Australia

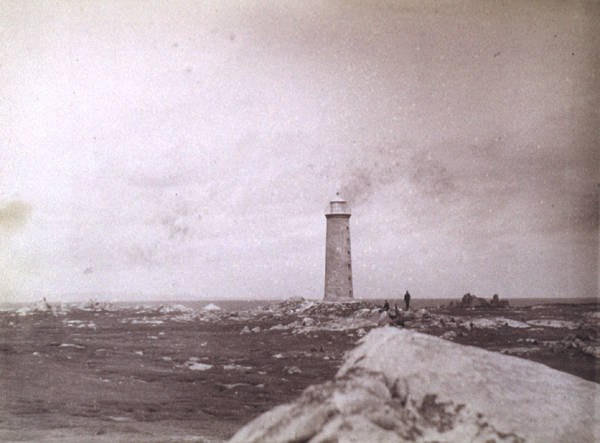
- Location: Goose Island; Tasmania; Australia
- Coordinates: 40°18′42.0″S 147°48′05.0″E

Tower
- Construction: rubble masonry tower
- Height: 30 metres (98 ft)
- Shape: conical tower with balcony and lantern
- Markings: white tower and lantern
- Power source: solar power
- Operator: Australian Maritime Safety Authority

Light
- First lit: 1846
- Focal height: 36 metres (118 ft)
- Intensity: 60,000 cd
- Range: 18 nautical miles (33 km)
- Characteristic: Fl (2) W 10s.

The Goose Island Lighthouse is operated by the Australian Maritime Safety Authority and has been unstaffed since 1931. It was originally constructed in 1846 with the use of convict labour. On 31 March 1857 the station was raided by pirates. From 1985 to 1990 a wind generator was used as a power source for the light, today the electricity is generated by solar panels. The tower was built as a 30-metre (98 ft)-tall rubblestone construction employing a Fresnel lens, which today is on display in Hobart at the Maritime Museum of Tasmania. The focal plane of the light source is located 36 m above sea level, the light's characteristic is a double flash every ten seconds.

Goose Island contains historic relics from the time when the lighthouse was staffed, such as the remains of a wooden tramway used to supply the lighthouse, as well as the graves of light keepers, or members of their families, who died by drowning.

== See also ==
- History of Tasmania
- List of lighthouses in Tasmania
