= Aagot (1882) =

Shipwreck of South Australia

Coordinates: 34.495349°S 137.336373°E

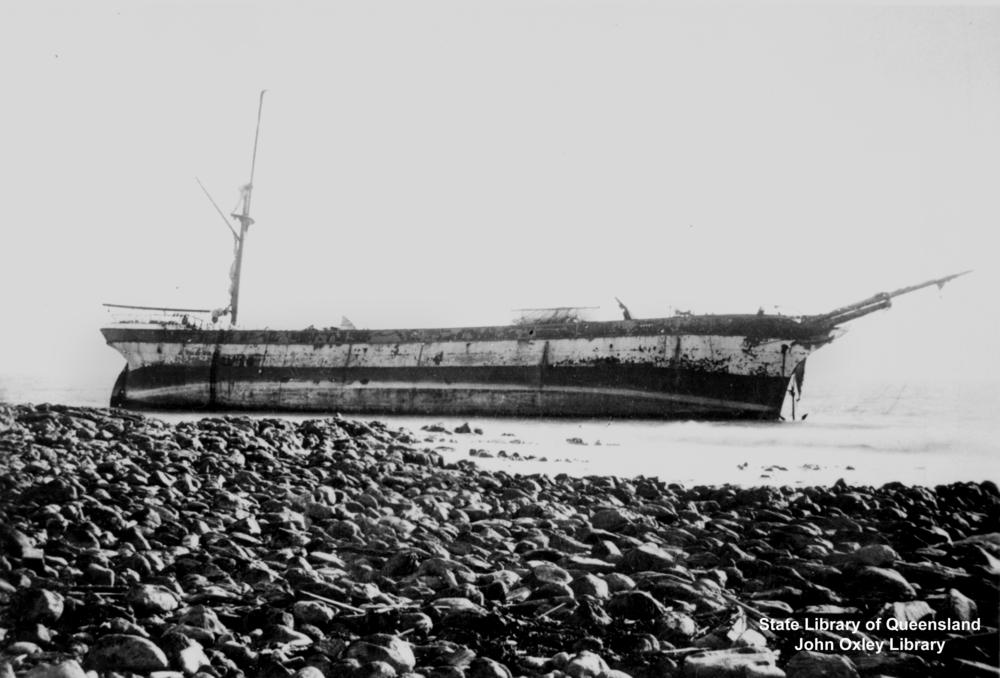
- Wreck of Aagot

History
- Name: Firth of Clyde (1882-1904); Aagot (1904-1907)
- Owner: Firth Line, Glasgow (1882-1904); Herman Jacobsen, Fredrikstad (1904-1907)
- Builder: Dobie & Company, Govan
- Yard number: 118
- Launched: 1 June 1882
- Identification: UK Official Number: 85945
- Fate: Wrecked, Wardang Island, SA,1907

General characteristics
- Tonnage: 1268 gross register tons, 1207 nrt
- Length: 228 feet (69 m)
- Beam: 36 feet (11 m)
- Depth: 21.5 feet (6.6 m)
- Sail plan: Square rig, later converted to barque rig

The Aagot was a three-masted square rig sailing ship built by Dobie & Company, Govan for the Firth Line, and it was first known as the Firth of Clyde and was launched on 1 June 1882.

She was wrecked on the rocks on the western side Wardang Island on 11 October 1907 while under the command of a Norwegian captain named Nielsen.

During the sinking there was no loss of life and one crew member, Oscar Olsen, made it to shore where he raised the alarm.

== See also ==
- List of shipwrecks of Australia
