= North West Mount Chappell Islet =

Islet in Tasmania, Australia

- Location within Tasmania
- Etymology: Flinders: Mount Chappelle, for his wife's maiden name

Geography
- Location: Bass Strait
- Coordinates: 40°16′S 147°54′E
- Archipelago: Badger Group, part of the Furneaux Group
- Area: 7,100 m^{2} (76,000 sq ft)

Administration
- Australia
- State: Tasmania

The North West Mount Chappell Islet, part of the Badger Group within the Furneaux Group, is a 7,100-square-metre (76,000 sq ft) unpopulated mainly granite islet, in Bass Strait, lying west of the Flinders and Cape Barren islands, Tasmania, south of Victoria, in south-eastern Australia. The island is located within a conservation area and is part of the Chalky, Big Green and Badger Island Groups Important Bird Area.

== Fauna ==
Recorded breeding seabird and wader species are little penguin, Pacific gull, silver gull, sooty oystercatcher, black-faced cormorant and Caspian tern.

== See also ==
- List of islands of Tasmania
