= Badger Island =

Island in Tasmania, Australia

- Location within Tasmania

Geography
- Location: Bass Strait
- Coordinates: 40°18′36″S 147°52′12″E
- Archipelago: Badger Group, part of the Furneaux Group
- Area: 1,242 ha (3,070 acres)

Administration
- Australia
- State: Tasmania

Badger Island, part of the Badger Group within the Furneaux Group, is a 1,242-hectare (3,070-acre) unpopulated low-lying granite and limestone island, located in Bass Strait, lying west of the Flinders and Cape Barren islands, Tasmania, south of Victoria, in south-eastern Australia.

The island is private property and is extensively grazed by livestock and macropods. It contains a homestead, jetty and airstrip. It is also part of the Chalky, Big Green and Badger Island Groups Important Bird Area.

Besides Badger Island, other islands that comprise the Badger Group include the Goose, Inner Little Goose, Little Badger, Little Goose, Mount Chappell, and Beagle islands, and the North West Mount Chappell Islet.

== Flora and fauna ==
Introduced plants, grazing and burning have had a heavy impact on the original vegetation, of which there are remnant communities of Poa and Stipa species at the western end of the island, as well as patches of Melaleuca and Casuarina scrub.

Recorded breeding seabird, wader and waterbird species include sooty oystercatcher, pied oystercatcher and Cape Barren goose, for which it is a major breeding site. White-bellied sea eagles have also nested on the island. Reptiles present include the metallic skink, spotted skink, White's skink, eastern blue-tongued lizard, mountain dragon, tiger snake and white-lipped snake. Native mammals found there are the red-necked wallaby and Tasmanian pademelon. Tasmanian devils were released on the island in 1998–99. Exotic mammals, apart from cattle and sheep, are the house mouse and feral cats.

== See also ==
- List of islands of Tasmania
