= Goose Island (South Australia) =

Rocky island in the Spencer Gulf of South Australia

Coordinates: 34°27′30″S 137°22′19″E

Geography
- Location: Spencer Gulf

Administration
- Australia

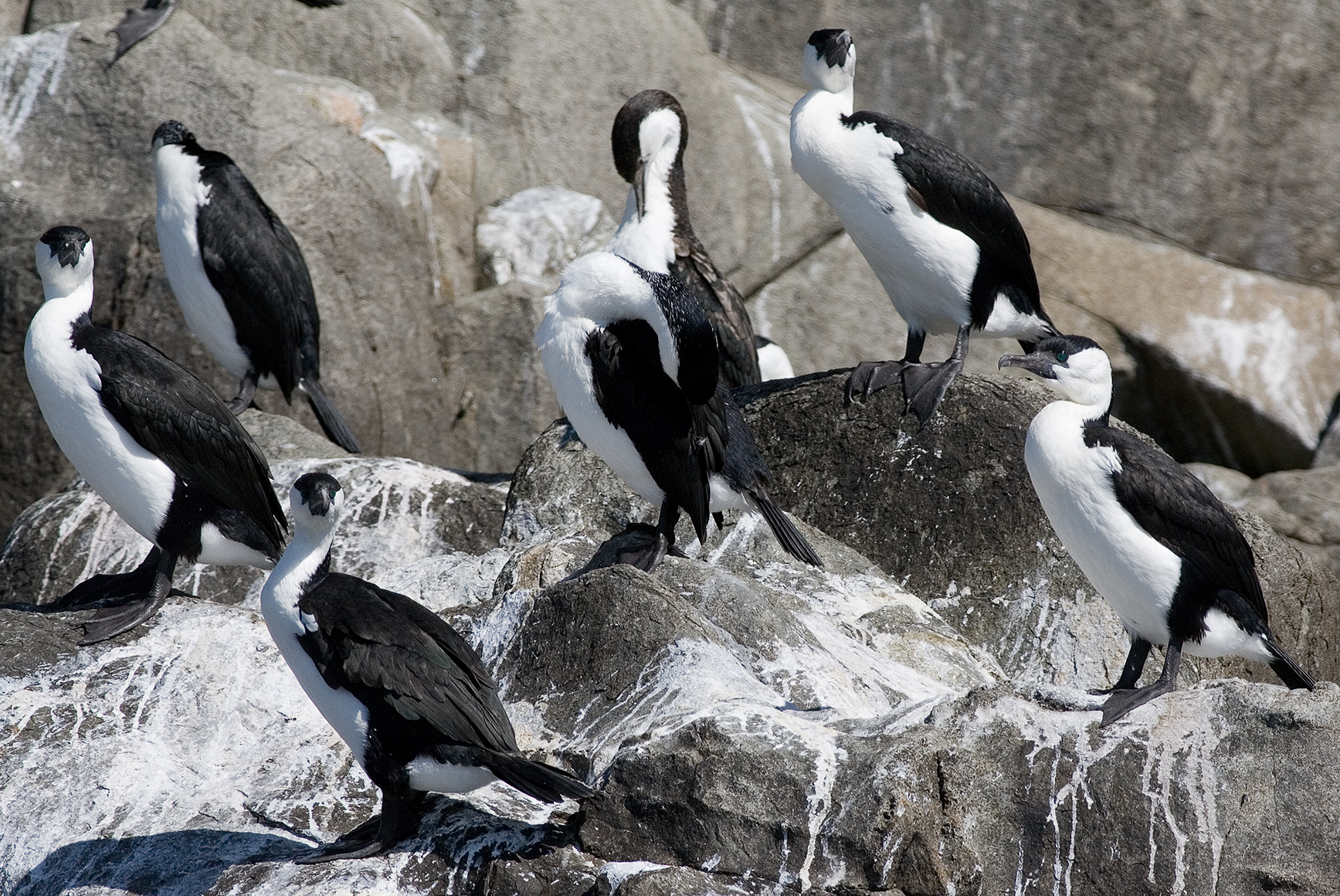
Goose Island is an important site for black-faced cormorants

Goose Island is a small (2 ha), rocky island lying about 550 m from the northern end of the much larger Wardang Island, off the west coast of the Yorke Peninsula, in the Spencer Gulf of South Australia. Rising to a height of 26 m, its vegetation is dominated by African boxthorn on clay and calcarenite soils. The waters surrounding the island are protected in the Goose Island Aquatic Reserve. The island was leased from the Department of Environment, Water and Natural Resources by Scotch College from 1996 to December 2024. The college relinquished its licence in advance of its 2027 expiry, handing the island back to traditional owners for alternative uses after several months of good faith negotiations and discussions between the College and DEW.

== Flora and fauna ==
=== Flora ===
Vegetation on Goose Island has degraded by activity such as grazing by feral goat and of 2009 was dominated by African boxthorn. Other introduced species include common iceplant, Capeweed great brome grass, slender thistle false caper and hedge mustard. Intact stands of native plants are found around the coastline including nitre-bush and marsh saltbush shrubland. Other native species include ruby saltbush, Australian hollyhock, climbing lignum, variable groundsel and bower spinach.

=== Fauna ===
Goose Island provides habitat for seabird species such as black-faced cormorants, little penguins, pied cormorants, pied oystercatchers and sooty oystercatchers. Crested terns and silver gulls also inhabit and breed on the island. Reptiles recorded included marbled geckoes, three species of skink, sleepy lizards (Tiliqua rugosa) and tiger snakes (Notechis scutatus). The island is also a haul out area for Australian sea lions. Introduced species such as cat, feral pigeon, goat, house mouse and rabbit have been present in the past and as of 2009, have been either eradicated, reduced or controlled.

==== Little penguins ====
Little penguins are also known to breed on Goose Island, and have been seen there since at least 1935, when they were reported coming ashore "in great numbers" at night, and occupying burrows by day. They were also reported by visitors in 1950.

== Alternative names ==
Some of the islands of the Goose Island group have alternative names. Little Goose Island bears the gazetted name of Cormorant Island while Seal Rocks are also known as The Scarles. Goose Island proper is sometimes referred to as Big Goose Island.

== Scotch College ==
The island was leased from 1966 to 2024 by Scotch College and was visited by groups of Year 10 students from the school. Students camped on the island and engaged in various aquatic and nature-based activities as part of their outdoor education program. These included sailing, kayaking, studying wildlife, land regeneration, snorkeling through shipwrecks and swimming with sea lions. The island's management was the shared responsibility of the lessee and the Department of Environment, Water and Natural Resources. Management activities included controlling feral animals and the eradication of introduced plant species, most notably African boxthorn.

== Protected area status ==
Goose Island is located within the extent of the Goose Island Conservation Park while the waters surrounding its shores are part of the Goose Island aquatic reserve and the Eastern Spencer Gulf Marine Park.

== See also ==
- Goose Island (disambiguation)
- List of islands of Australia
- List of little penguin colonies
