= Red-throated cool-skink =

Conservation status
- Least Concern (IUCN 3.1)

Scientific classification
- Kingdom: Animalia
- Phylum: Chordata
- Class: Reptilia
- Order: Squamata
- Family: Scincidae
- Genus: Acritoscincus
- Species: A. platynotus

Binomial name
- Acritoscincus platynotus (Peters, 1881)

Species of lizard

The red-throated cool-skink or red-throated skink (Acritoscincus platynotus) is a species of skink, a lizard in the family Scincidae. The species is endemic to Australia.
