= Mile Island =

Island in Tasmania, Australia

- Location within Tasmania

Geography
- Location: Bass Strait
- Coordinates: 40°07′12″S 147°54′36″E
- Archipelago: Big Green Group, part of the Furneaux Group
- Area: 4 ha (9.9 acres)

Administration
- Australia
- State: Tasmania

The Mile Island, part of the Big Green Group within the Furneaux Group, is a 4-hectare (9.9-acre) granite island, located in Bass Strait west of Flinders Island, in Tasmania, in south-eastern Australia. The island is partly contained within a conservation area; and is part of the Chalky, Big Green and Badger Island Groups Important Bird Area.

== Fauna ==
Recorded breeding seabird and wader species are little penguin, short-tailed shearwater, Pacific gull, sooty oystercatcher and black-faced cormorant. The metallic skink is present.

== See also ==
- List of islands of Tasmania
