= Southwestern cool-skink =

Conservation status
- Least Concern (IUCN 3.1)

Scientific classification
- Kingdom: Animalia
- Phylum: Chordata
- Class: Reptilia
- Order: Squamata
- Family: Scincidae
- Genus: Acritoscincus
- Species: A. trilineatus

Binomial name
- Acritoscincus trilineatus (Gray, 1838)

Species of lizard

The southwestern cool-skink (Acritoscincus trilineatus) is a species of skink.

== Taxonomy ==
The species was described in 1838 by John Edward Gray, based on a specimen held at the British Museum of Natural History, the author assigning it to the genus Tiliqua.

Common names for the species include western three-lined skink, New Holland skink and southwestern cool-skink, a name that refers to the cooler climates of its southern distribution range.

== Description ==
A species of Acritoscincus found in the Southwest Australia region and an isolated population in South Australia. Their body is moderately stocky in form, with smooth scales, functional and strong limbs that each have five digits. Their total length, from head to tail, is around 190 millimetres, the snout to vent length is 70 mm. Both the sexes have a red patch at their throat which varies in its intensity of colour, becoming more noticeable during the breeding season.

The coloration of A. trilineatus resembles the species Pseudemoia entrecasteauxii, the southern grass-skink, which occurs in a similar distribution range.

== Distribution and habitat ==
It is found in damp and cool habitat, such as wetlands, and often basking in a sunny position in the early part of the day. The habitat also includes areas that are seasonally wet, but always with at least some remaining native vegetation. The foraging activity, during which they seek small insect prey, is all undertaken during the day; their activities switches from feeding to basking in response to the weather conditions. The distribution range extends from Israelite Bay to Gingin in the southwest of Australia, and at the off-shore Rottnest Island. The occurrence in South Australia is at a much smaller range in an area near the tip of the Eyre Peninsula. It is regarded as common throughout it range, and frequently observed in surveys of reptilian fauna.

The IUCN Red List published an assessment in 2017 of least concern.
