= Goose Island Conservation Park =

Protected area in South Australia

- IUCN category III (natural monument or feature)
- Location within South Australia
- Location: South Australia
- Nearest city: Port Victoria
- Coordinates: 34°27′16″S 137°21′48″E
- Area: 35 ha (86 acres)
- Established: 27 April 1972
- Visitors: ‘a few hundred a year’ (in 2009)
- Governing body: Department for Environment and Water

Goose Island Conservation Park is a protected area in the Australian state of South Australia, located on Goose Island and other islets in the vicinity of Wardang Island in Spencer Gulf. The constituent islands are located within 5 kilometres (3.1 miles) to 12 kilometres (7.5 miles) in the sector between west and north west of Port Victoria.

Land consisting of "Goose Island and White Rock Island, together with the adjacent rocky islands north-west of Goose Island" was declared on 29 September 1966 as "fauna reserves" under the Fauna Conservation Act 1965. The conservation park was proclaimed in 1972 to "conserve an offshore breeding and refuge area for sea-birds and the Australian sea lion (Neophoca cinerea)". The conservation park consists of the following islands: Goose Island, Little Goose Island, Seal Rocks and White Rocks located to the immediate north of Wardang Island with Beatrice Rock, Island Point and Rocky Island all located to the east of Wardang Island, and Boat Rock and Bikini Islets being located on the west side of Wardang Island.

The conservation park is classified as an IUCN Category III protected area. In 1980, it was listed on the now-defunct Register of the National Estate.

== Non-statutory arrangements ==
The Goose Island Conservation Park have been identified by BirdLife International as an Important Bird Area because it is considered to support over 1% of the world population of black-faced cormorants, holding up to 750 breeding pairs. It is also a frequently used site for fairy terns which have been recorded as breeding there.

== See also ==
- Protected areas of South Australia
- Goose Island (disambiguation)
