= Little Badger Island =

Island in Tasmania, Australia

- Location within Tasmania

Geography
- Location: Bass Strait
- Coordinates: 40°18′00″S 147°54′36″E
- Archipelago: Badger Group, part of the Furneaux Group
- Area: 2.5 ha (6.2 acres)

Administration
- Australia
- State: Tasmania

The Little Badger Island, part of the Badger Group within the Furneaux Group, is a 2.5-hectare (6.2-acre) unpopulated low-lying granite island, located in Bass Strait, lying west of the Flinders and Cape Barren islands, Tasmania, south of Victoria, in south-eastern Australia.

The island is contained within a nature reserve. The island is also part of the Chalky, Big Green and Badger Island Groups Important Bird Area.

== Fauna ==
Recorded breeding seabird and wader species include little penguin, short-tailed shearwater, white-faced storm-petrel, Pacific gull, silver gull, sooty oystercatcher, black-faced cormorant and Caspian tern.

== See also ==
- List of islands of Tasmania
