= Chalky, Big Green and Badger Island Groups Important Bird Area =

Important Bird Area in Tasmania, Australia

Coordinates: 40°14′S 147°53′E

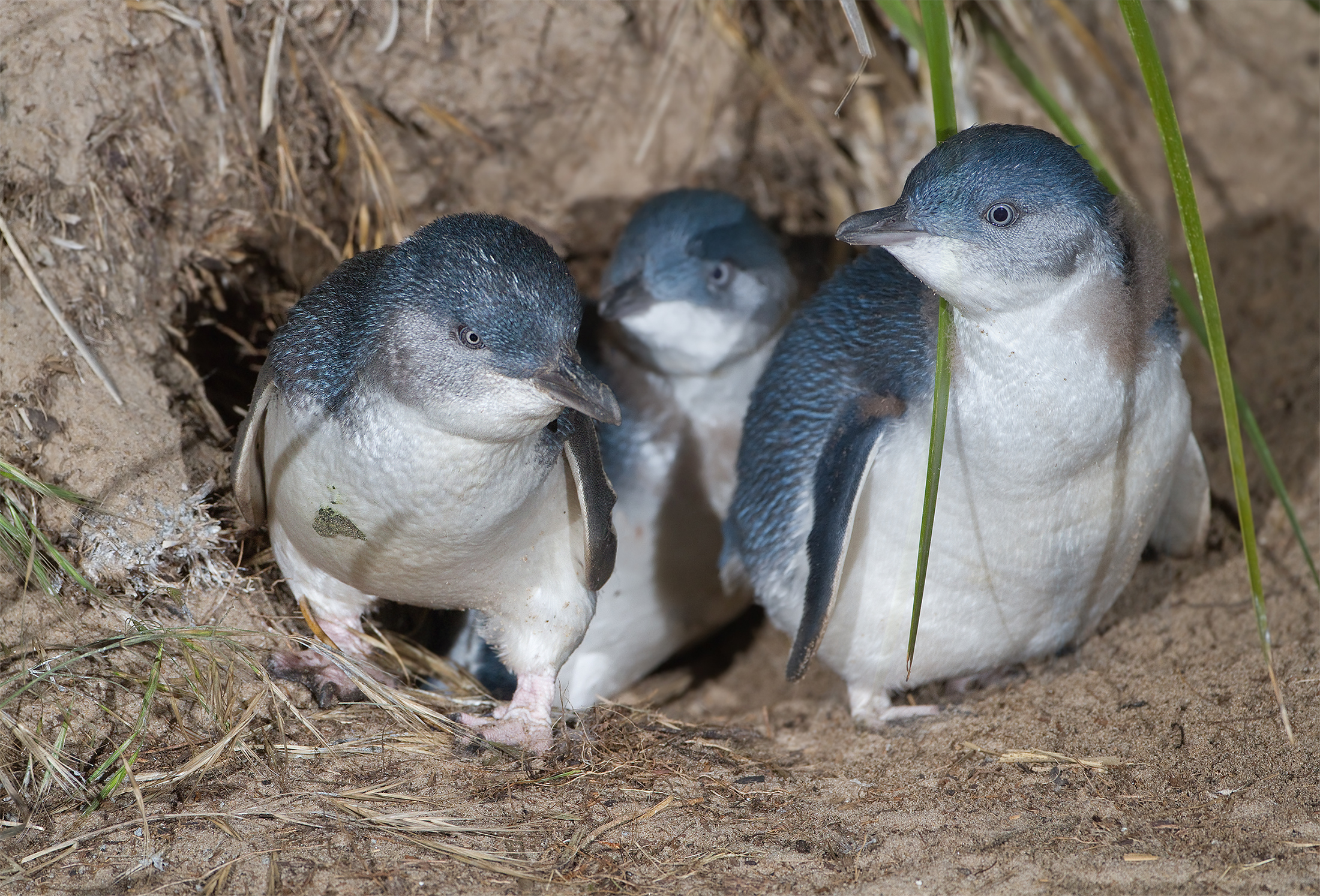
The islands of the IBA are home to up to 41,000 pairs of little penguins

The Chalky, Big Green and Badger Island Groups Important Bird Area lies in eastern Bass Strait west of Flinders in the Furneaux Group of Tasmania, Australia. Its component islands collectively form a 21 km^{2} Important Bird Area (IBA) which supports more than 1% of the global populations of the Cape Barren goose, black-faced cormorant, little penguin, white-faced storm-petrel, short-tailed shearwater, Pacific gull, and sooty oystercatcher. It also supports significant numbers of fairy terns.

The islands include:

Chalky Island Group

- Chalky Island
- Little Chalky Island
- Isabella Island
- Mile Island

Big Green Island Group

- Big Green Island
- East Kangaroo Island

Badger Island Group

- Badger Island
- Little Badger Island
- Mount Chappell Island
- North West Mount Chappell Islet
- Goose Island
- Little Goose Island
- Inner Little Goose Island
- Beagle Island
