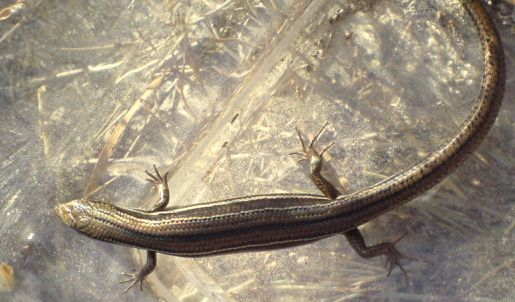
- Eastern three-lined skink (Acritoscincus duperreyi)

Scientific classification
- Kingdom: Animalia
- Phylum: Chordata
- Class: Reptilia
- Order: Squamata
- Family: Scincidae
- Subfamily: Eugongylinae
- Genus: Acritoscincus; Wells & Wellington, 1985

Type species
- Lygosoma duperreyi Gray, 1838

Species
- 3, see text

= Acritoscincus =

Genus of lizards

Acritoscincus is a genus of Australian skinks (family Scincidae). It belongs to the Eugongylus group; the genus Oligosoma appears to be a fairly close relative. An alternative name is Bassiana.

== Species ==
- Acritoscincus duperreyi (Gray, 1838) -- eastern three-lined skink, bold-striped cool-skink
- Acritoscincus platynotus (Peters, 1881) -- red-throated cool-skink, red-throated skink
- Acritoscincus trilineatus (Gray, 1838) -- southwestern cool-skink, western three-lined skink, New Holland skink
