= Mount Chappell Island =

Island in Tasmania, Australia

- Location within Tasmania
- Etymology: Flinders: Mount Chappelle, for his wife's maiden name

Geography
- Location: Bass Strait
- Coordinates: 40°16′12″S 147°55′12″E
- Archipelago: Badger Group, part of the Furneaux Group
- Area: 323 ha (800 acres)

Administration
- Australia
- State: Tasmania

Mount Chappell Island (or Chappell Island) is a 323-hectare (800-acre) unpopulated granite island with a distinctive central hill, one of the Bass Strait islands of Tasmania. It is part of the Badger Group within the Furneaux Group, lying west of Flinders and Cape Barren Islands.

The island was originally named Mount Chappelle by Matthew Flinders for his wife's maiden name. The island is private property, used for grazing sheep and Cape Barren geese, and is a classic example of natural habitat degradation caused by human activities. The island forms part of the Chalky, Big Green and Badger Island Groups Important Bird Area.

== History ==
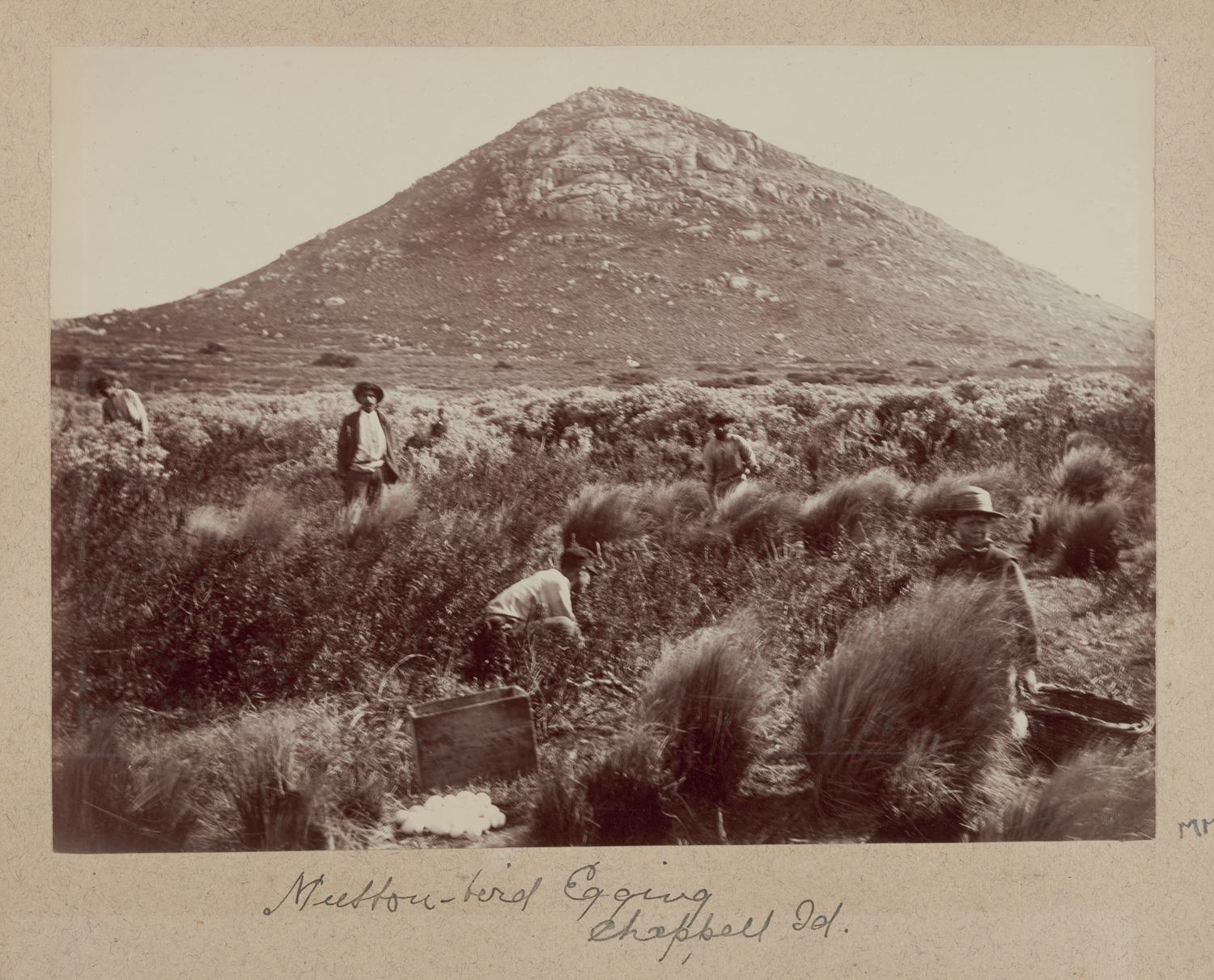
Mutton-bird Egging on Mount Chappell Island (1893)

Mount Chappell Island was historically a major site for muttonbirding, the practice of harvesting the meat, eggs and oil of migratory seabirds. In the 19th century the mixed-race descendants of Aboriginal Tasmanians took part in an annual muttonbird harvest on the island, which had a reputation for containing the most densely populated rookeries. According to Charles Nantes, who visited the island in 1862, participants in the harvest could catch up to 1,500 muttonbirds per day, living in small thatched huts during the birding season and processing oil and meat. Eggs were harvested earlier in the season and sent to market in Launceston.

== Fauna ==
The island's habitats have been severely modified by slashing, ploughing, grazing and burning. Short-tailed shearwaters breed there. Little penguins used to breed in large numbers but have since ceased to do so. Apart from sheep, mammals introduced deliberately or inadvertently are the house mouse, a species of rat and feral cats. Reptiles present include Bougainville's skink, spotted skink, metallic skink, three-lined skink and tiger snake.

== See also ==
- List of islands of Tasmania
