= Beagle Island =

Island in Tasmania, Australia

- Location within Tasmania
- Etymology: HMS Beagle

Geography
- Location: Bass Strait
- Coordinates: 40°19′48″S 147°55′12″E
- Archipelago: Badger Group, part of the Furneaux Group
- Area: 1.2 ha (3.0 acres)

Administration
- Australia
- State: Tasmania

The Beagle Island, part of the Badger Group within the Furneaux Group, is a 1.2-hectare (3.0-acre) unpopulated low, flat granite island, located in Bass Strait, lying west of the Flinders and Cape Barren islands, Tasmania, south of Victoria, in south-eastern Australia. The island is contained within a nature reserve and is part of the Chalky, Big Green and Badger Island Groups Important Bird Area.

The island was named after HMS Beagle by Captain John Lort Stokes, who surveyed the area in 1840.

== Fauna ==
Recorded breeding seabird and wader species are little penguin, short-tailed shearwater, Pacific gull, silver gull, sooty oystercatcher, black-faced cormorant and Caspian tern.

== See also ==
- List of islands of Tasmania
