= Little Chalky Island =

Island in Tasmania, Australia

- Location within Tasmania

Geography
- Location: Bass Strait
- Coordinates: 40°07′48″S 147°53′24″E
- Archipelago: Big Green Group, part of the Furneaux Group
- Area: 5 ha (12 acres)

Administration
- Australia
- State: Tasmania

Demographics
- Population: unpopulated

The Little Chalky Island, part of the Big Green Group within the Furneaux Group, is a 5-hectare (12-acre) unpopulated granite island, located in the Bass Strait, west of the Flinders Island and south of Chalky Island, in Tasmania, in south-eastern Australia. The island is part of the Chalky, Big Green and Badger Island Groups Important Bird Area.

== Fauna ==
Recorded breeding seabird and wader species are little penguin, short-tailed shearwater, white-faced storm-petrel, Pacific gull, sooty oystercatcher, black-faced cormorant and Caspian tern. Cape Barren geese also breed on the island. The metallic skink is present.

== See also ==
- List of islands of Tasmania
