= East Kangaroo Island =

Island in Tasmania, Australia

- Location within Tasmania

Geography
- Location: Bass Strait
- Coordinates: 40°10′48″S 147°54′00″E
- Archipelago: Big Green Group, part of the Furneaux Group
- Area: 157 ha (390 acres)

Administration
- Australia
- State: Tasmania

Demographics
- Population: unpopulated

The East Kangaroo Island, part of the Big Green Group within the Furneaux Group, is a 157-hectare (390-acre) unpopulated limestone island with granite outcrops and dolerite dykes, located in the Bass Strait, west of the Flinders Island, in Tasmania, in south-eastern Australia.

Prior to its declaration as the East Kangaroo Island Nature Reserve, the island was previously used to graze sheep, with overgrazing causing severe erosion. The island is part of the Chalky, Big Green and Badger Island Groups Important Bird Area.

== Fauna ==
Recorded breeding seabird and wader species are little penguin, short-tailed shearwater, Pacific gull, silver gull, sooty oystercatcher and crested tern. Cape Barren geese also breed on the island. Reptiles present include the metallic skink and White's skink. The only terrestrial mammal is the introduced House mouse.

== See also ==
- List of islands of Tasmania
- Protected areas of Tasmania
