= Goose Island (Connecticut) =

Island in Connecticut, United States

Goose Island is an island owned by Stratford, Connecticut below I-95 in the Housatonic River. The island is currently a set of three islets due to erosion running north–south near the Stratford bank of the river. The island is south-southwest of the Washington Bridge, roughly parallel to Housatonic Avenue.

== Physical description ==
- 41°11′39″N 73°7′1″W
- Elevation: c. 3 feet (0.91 m)

== Transportation ==
All transportation to and from the island is by boat.
