= Little Goose Island =

Island in Tasmania, Australia

- Location within Tasmania

Geography
- Location: Bass Strait
- Coordinates: 40°17′24″S 147°46′48″E
- Archipelago: Badger Group, part of the Furneaux Group
- Area: 3.6 ha (8.9 acres)

Administration
- Australia
- State: Tasmania

The Little Goose Island, part of the Badger Group within the Furneaux Group, is a 3.6-hectare (8.9-acre) unpopulated flat, round granite island, located in Bass Strait, lying west of the Flinders and Cape Barren islands, Tasmania, south of Victoria, in south-eastern Australia. The island is contained within a nature reserve and is part of the Chalky, Big Green and Badger Island Groups Important Bird Area.

== Fauna ==
Recorded breeding seabird and wader species are little penguin, short-tailed shearwater, Pacific gull, sooty oystercatcher and black-faced cormorant. The metallic skink is present.

== See also ==
- List of islands of Tasmania
