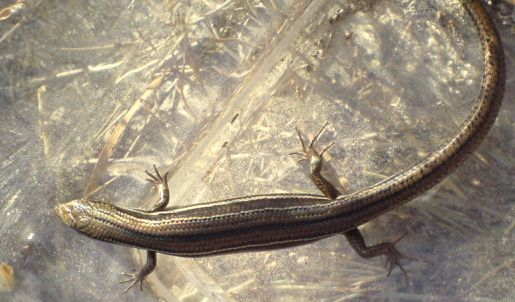

Conservation status
- Least Concern (IUCN 3.1)

Scientific classification
- Kingdom: Animalia
- Phylum: Chordata
- Class: Reptilia
- Order: Squamata
- Family: Scincidae
- Genus: Acritoscincus
- Species: A. duperreyi

Binomial name
- Acritoscincus duperreyi (Gray, 1838)

Synonyms
- Tiliqua duperreyi Gray, 1838; Lygosoma duperreyii — A.M.C. Duméril & Bibron, 1839; Eulepis duperreyi — Fitzinger, 1843; Leiolopisma duperreyi — Greer, 1982; Leiolopisma trilineatum — Greer, 1982; Acritoscincus duperreyi — Wells & Wellington, 1984; Acritoscincus buddeni Wells & Wellington, 1985; Bassiana duperreyi — Hutchinson et al., 1990; Pseudemoia duperreyi — Frank & Ramus, 1995; Bassiana duperreyi — Cogger, 2000; Acritoscincus duperreyi — S. Wilson & Swan, 2010

= Eastern three-lined skink =

Species of lizard

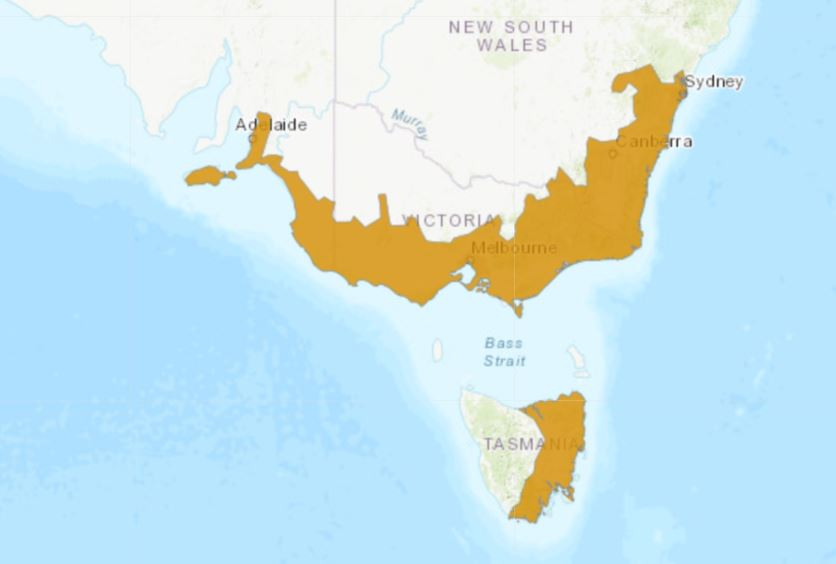
Shows the extent of the range from IUCN data

The eastern three-lined skink (Acritoscincus duperreyi), also known commonly as the bold-striped cool-skink, is a species of skink, a lizard in the family Scincidae. The species is endemic to Australia. A. duperreyi has been extensively studied in the context of understanding the evolution of learning, viviparity in lizards, and temperature- and genetic-sex determination. A. duperreyi is classified as a species of "Least Concern" by the IUCN.

== Taxonomy ==
The species has also been placed in the genus Bassiana, with two other species of skink: B. trilineata and B. palynota. Micro-genetic analyses have revealed that the genus Bassiana began to diversify during the Miocene, suggesting that these three lineages started to form between 16.2 and 9.7 million years ago. Individual species in the genus began to diversify as well through the Miocene and into the Early Pleistocene. Within A. duperreyi, population-level diversification between the population on Tasmania, Kangaroo Island, and mainland Australia likely took place during the Upper Pliocene through the Early Pleistocene. Genetic evidence suggests that there are seven distinct lineages of A. duperreyi: five on mainland Australia, one on Tasmania and Flinders Island, and another on Kangaroo Island.

== Nomenclature ==
The eastern three-lined skink is called many common names and has been referred to by multiple scientific names as well in past literature. Modern research refers to the eastern three-lined skink as Acritoscincus duperreyi (Gray, 1838). However, in the past, the eastern three-lined skink was also referred to as Tiliqua duperreyi in Gray's original description in 1838; Acritoscincus duperreyi by Wells and Wellington in 1984 and 1985; Bassiana duperreyi by Hutchinson et al. in 1990; Leiolopisma duperreyi by Greer in 1982; Leiolopisma eulepis by Frank and Ramus in 1985; Leiolopisma trilineatum by Greer in 1982, and by Cogger in 1983; Lygosoma duperreyii by A.M.C. Dumeril and Bibron in 1839; and Pseudemoia duperreyi by Frank and Ramus in 1985. Common names include the eastern three-lined skink, the bold-striped cool-skink, Duperrey's window-eyed skink, or simply the three-lined skink.

=== Etymology ===
The specific name, duperreyi, was given by British zoologist John Edward Gray, in order to honour French naval officer Louis-Isidore Duperrey. Duperrey was known for his explorations of Australia and the New Guinea archipelago, where he collected various flora and fauna.

== Distribution and habitat ==
A. duperreyi is found in south-eastern Australia (New South Wales, South Australia, Tasmania, Victoria), and several islands. The eastern three-lined skink has been found on Babel Island, Big Dog Island, Flinders Island, Little Dog Island, and Maria Island.

A. duperreyi habitats include grasslands, wet-dry sclerophyll forests, temperate forests, temperate shrublands, human-developed pasturelands, and Alpine regions. They are particularly abundant in cool climate regions of south-eastern Australia. Though they are abundant in high-elevation regions, A. duperreyi does not live at higher elevations than 1,650 meters.

== Description ==
A. duperreyi is strongly striped and it has a characteristic pattern of stripes running down the length of its body. Black or grey stripes usually run along the sides of its body, with a black stripe running down the spine as well. A hatchling typically has bright red colouration on its throat, which fades to an orange-pink or disappears after a few weeks of life. The skink has a comparatively small body size, ranging up to 80 millimeters in snout-tail length. Hatchling Bassiana have relatively larger head sizes than adults. Unlike most skinks, A. duperreyi has greater than 22 maxillary teeth. However, like many other skinks, A. duperreyi has an autonomous tail that can easily break away from the rest of the body due to its unique musculature and caudal fracture plate.

Pengilley (1972) distinguished three distinct populations of A. duperreyi based on appearance (Form A, B, and C). Form A can be distinguished from Form B based on its non-continuous dark vertebral stripe, and the rare occurrence of the upper light line in the middle of a scale row. The vertebral line of form C is also broken, however typically into spots as opposed to lines in form A. The lateral line in Form C is also typically absent. Form A has been associated with south-western Australia. Form B has been found in Barrington Tops in New South Wales, Kangaroo Island in South Australia, and Flinders Island, Tasmania. Form C has been found in New South Wales.

== Reproduction ==
A. duperreyi is oviparous, meaning that parents lay eggs from which young hatch. Females lay eggs once a year in the early summer, with clutch sizes ranging between 3 and 9 eggs. Additionally, gravid females typically lay eggs at communal sites. Typically, these communal sites are located in open areas, under logs, or under rocks. Females prefer to lay eggs in sunny areas. Nests are typically shallow compared to other reptile species. In one study that assessed A. duperreyi nests over the course of eleven years, 64% of nests were found to be communal. Nest-site availability varies significantly over time in the habitat of A. duperreyi; despite this, there is little temporal variation in communal nesting patterns. Also, there is no significant temperature difference between solitary and communal nests. Eggs raised in communal nests have lower water content than those raised in solitary nests, however hatchlings born from communal nests are larger in size. Communal hatchlings also had shorter tails and tended to run faster than solitary hatchlings.

=== Hatchling development ===
The temperature of incubation and the elevation of the clutch can affect the development of offspring before and after hatching, as well as behaviour throughout the skink's life. Females typically choose where to lay eggs based on the expected average temperature of incubation for their eggs. Experiments have shown that incubation temperatures significantly impact embryogenesis and therefore incubation time, as well as body size and behaviours of hatchlings. Snout-vent length is significantly longer for hatchlings incubated at lower elevations. Survival of eggs also increased at hotter incubation temperatures. Prolonged incubation in cold environments delays hatching and reduces hatchling success. Effects of incubation temperature also impact the sexes differently, contributing to the scientific understanding of temperature-dependent sex determination.

Despite the relationship between incubation temperature and offspring phenotype, Shine and Harlow (1997) found that gravid female duperreyi do not select nest sites to match the phenotypic norms of their offspring. A study that varied thermal environments of eggs during incubation found that variable thermal regimes, rather than a continuously "hot" or "cold" incubation environment, increased the rate embryo development in A. duperreyi, as measured by an increase in embryonic heart rate. Additionally, A. duperreyi hatchlings do not appear to acclimate their embryonic heart rates to their thermal incubation environment, possibly due to thermal variation at nest sites. At the same mean temperature of incubation, temperature fluctuations rather than a stable regime allowed more embryonic development to take place per day. Indeed, data on A. duperreyi nesting patterns suggests that females do lay eggs in areas with high temperature variance during the day.

Studies understanding the effects of incubation temperature on hatchling phenotypes have been used to understand the evolution of viviparity, the birth of live young, in reptiles. Studies in A. duperreyi provide further evidence in favour of the "cold climate hypothesis". Mimicking in-utero environments through the retention of eggs in high-temperature environments improved hatchling success and viability in cold-incubation eggs, along with increased time of egg retention.

==== Sex determination and sex reversal ====
In some vertebrate species, sex is determined genetically, while in others, environmental factors such as temperature impact sex development. A. duperreyi is one of two species of lizard in which sex reversal is confirmed. A. duperreyi has an XX/XY sex determination system. Incubation temperatures of below 20 °C causes the reversal of a genotypic female (XX) to a phenotypic male in experimental conditions. Sex reversal of genotypic females into phenotypic males occurs in the wild, though at a low rate. Appropriately, cool Alpine climates have the highest proportion of sex-reversed males, at 28% in one case. It is unclear if these males are fertile.

Additionally, it has been found that larger eggs produced female offspring regardless of incubation temperature. Multiple hypotheses seek to explain this phenomenon. Larger female A. duperreyi produce more eggs, so there may be a selective advantage to conferring larger size to female offspring rather than male offspring.

==== Stress and development ====
Simulations of stress-induced A. duperreyi embryos found that under high-stress conditions, growth rate of hatchlings was increased. Though non-significant, these high-stress simulating treatments resulted in a shifted sex ratio in hatchlings, favouring males. Though the cited study used corticosteroids to simulate stress, another study found that steroid hormone levels (testosterone, estradiol, and dihydrotestosterone) in biopsied egg yolks did not differ significantly between eggs destined to become male or destined to become female. The effects of maternal hormones on hatchling development are therefore unclear.

== Behaviour ==
=== Anti-predator defence ===
The eastern three-lined skink has been demonstrated to exhibit certain anti-predatory behaviours. Hatchlings have been found to suddenly stop running away from predators and face them while wiggling their tails in a vertical position. It is hypothesised that such behaviour grants the lizard a chance to escape while the predator is occupied, then seizes, the moving tail. A 2011 study confirmed that slower hatchlings were more likely to exhibit tail-waving behaviour. This weakens the pursuit-deterrent explanation of this behaviour, which posits that anti-predator displays are a true reflection of an individual's ability to escape. This finding supports previous research that hypothesised tail-waving as a behaviour that deflects predators towards an expendable body part. Indeed, after waving its tail, hatchling A. duperreyi ran back towards the stimulated threat during these experiments, further strengthening the hypothesis that this behaviour is designed to misdirect the attention of predators. Hatchling A. duperreyi may make the choice to tail-wave when they are sufficiently tired from escaping, as tail-waving behaviour increased significantly as running distance increases. Males are also slightly more likely to exhibit this behaviour than females. Phylogenetic analysis of studies among lizard families Iguanadae, Lacertidae, Scincidae, and Gekkonidae suggests that the deflection function of tail-waving behaviour may be an ancestral trait, whereas the pursuit-deterrent function is derived.

=== Basking ===
Incubation temperature has been linked to the degree of basking behaviour in duperreyi hatchlings. Those hatched from eggs incubated at lower temperatures have shown to bask for longer periods of time following hatching.

=== Learning ===
A. duperreyi hatchlings have been demonstrated to have the ability to learn to navigate mazes and visual discrimination tasks based on colour. Experimental manipulation of mazes demonstrated that hatchlings use visual colour cues, rather than spatial cues, to locate coloured cap-covered food within mazes. Hatchlings incubated in warmer conditions were significantly better at learning to remove caps to access food, suggesting that incubation conditions may affect learning ability. A 2012 study showed that the better learning ability of hot-incubated hatchlings was not related to body size or locomotor speed, strengthening the proposed connection between better learning and hotter incubation environments. Indeed, a 2017 study found differences in forebrain development between cold-incubated and hot-incubated hatchlings. Greater neural density was found in the telencephalons of hot-incubated hatchlings, which is consistent with their apparent increase in learning ability.

=== Communal nesting ===
Gravid A. duperreyi intentionally select to lay eggs in communal nesting sites. One study found that captive females chose to lay eggs in nesting sites that contain dummy eggs far more often than what a random-choice null hypothesis would suggest. While there is extensive theory about the benefits of communal nesting for reptiles, including easier nest excavation for females and socialization environments for hatchlings, such hypotheses have yet to be tested in A. duperreyi. So far, the determined benefits of communal nesting are found to be increased hatchling size and running speed.

=== Feeding ===
Experiments have shown that A. duperreyi is more likely to flee from large rather than small prey, and are less likely to attack prey larger than their body size. However, in some of these trials, specimens did attack crickets larger than their own bodies. This skink modifies its method of attack according to the size of prey: large crickets were more likely to be seized by their head or legs first, while small crickets were attacked at the abdomen. Attack success depended on the size of prey, with A. duperreyi being more successful when prey size was smaller. Because of this, less mass was gained in trials when A. duperreyi was enclosed with only the opportunity to feed on large prey. When prey size was greater than 30% of body mass, A. duperreyi lost mass over the course of the experiment. The energy and water expenditure of attempted attacks likely outweighs the gain of successfully feeding on larger prey.

=== Diet ===
A. duperreyi feeds on small invertebrates, namely insects. Diets of similar species suggest that A. duperreyi is a foraging generalist. Diet does not change significantly in either contents or prey size between juveniles and adults.

=== Predation ===
Little is known about the predators of this species. Snakes and birds are likely common predators. In particular, the white-lipped snake, D. coronoides, occupies much of the range of A. duperreyi.

== Conservation ==
Forest fires are not uncommon in A. duperreyi habitats, though they do not typically spread. In January 2003, lightning strikes resulted in the onset and spread of forest fires in the Brindabella Range. Drought and hot temperatures led to the rapid spread of these fires. Shine, Brown, and Elphick (2016) used pre- and post- fire data collected over five years to understand the effect of forest fires on A. duperreyi nesting patterns. At one site, Piccadilly Circus, fires decimated nesting sites and the eggs within them. Eggs collected from Ginini Flats, though exposed to atypical incubation temperatures, did not see reduced hatchling success. Vegetation at Piccadilly Circus was seriously affected, and it took five years for vegetation to return to pre-fire conditions. Egg counts at Piccadilly Circus, though not the other sites, did fall after the fire. Egg counts returned to normal during the five-year study period. Maternal preference for laying eggs in open areas did protect A. duperreyi from some levels of overheating, so only the habitat most affected by the fire was seriously impacted. A. duperreyi can, though, recover from the impact of forest fires.

The IUCN classifies A. duperreyi as being of 'least concern'. Threats include residential and commercial development specifically, as well as threats that apply generally to all reptiles, such as habitat degradation due to introduced species and predation by cats, dogs, and pigs.

=== Effect of climate change ===
A. duperreyi females have changed their nesting behaviour potentially in response to increasing ambient temperature over the past decade. A 2009 study found a 1.5 °C average temperature increase within A. duperreyi nests over a decade. While females did dig deeper nests and laid eggs much earlier in the reproductive season, potentially accounting for these temperature increases, these changes in behaviour were insufficient to reduce warming experienced by eggs late in the incubation period. Such changes can have drastic consequences on the phenotypes of offspring, as it has been demonstrated that incubation temperature has consequences on the size, locomotion speed, sex, and learning ability of A. duperreyi hatchlings.
