= Goose Island (Tasmania) =

Island in Tasmania, Australia

- Location within Tasmania

Geography
- Location: Bass Strait
- Coordinates: 40°17′24″S 147°47′24″E
- Archipelago: Badger Group, part of the Furneaux Group
- Area: 109 ha (270 acres)

Administration
- Australia
- State: Tasmania

The Goose Island, part of the Badger Group within the Furneaux Group, is a 109-hectare (270-acre) unpopulated elongated granite island, located in Bass Strait, lying west of the Flinders and Cape Barren islands, Tasmania, south of Victoria, in south-eastern Australia.

The Goose Island Lighthouse is at the narrow southern end, and is a conservation area. The island is also part of the Chalky, Big Green and Badger Island Groups Important Bird Area.

== Flora and fauna ==
There are patches of the introduced noxious weed African boxthorn at the wider northern end of the island. Otherwise the flora is dominated by mats of Aizoaceae succulents, Poa and Stipa, with some Acacia and Leptospermum woody plants.

Recorded breeding seabird and wader species are little penguin, short-tailed shearwater, Pacific gull, silver gull and sooty oystercatcher. Reptiles present include the metallic skink and spotted skink.

== See also ==
- List of islands of Tasmania
