= Chalky Island (Tasmania) =

Island in Tasmania, Australia

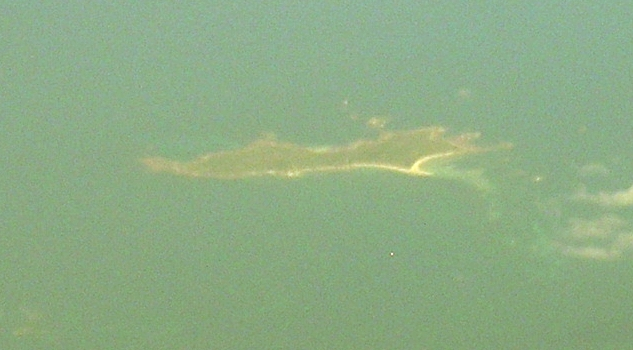
- An aerial view of Chalky Island, from the east

- Location within Tasmania

Geography
- Location: Bass Strait
- Coordinates: 40°05′24″S 147°52′48″E
- Archipelago: Big Green Group, part of the Furneaux Group
- Area: 41 ha (100 acres)

Administration
- Australia
- State: Tasmania

Demographics
- Population: unpopulated

The Chalky Island, part of the Big Green Group within the Furneaux Group, is a 41-hectare (100-acre) unpopulated granite island with limestone outcrops and dolerite dykes, located in the Bass Strait, west of the Flinders Island, in Tasmania, in south-eastern Australia. The island is contained within a conservation area and is part of the Chalky, Big Green and Badger Island Groups Important Bird Area.

== Fauna ==
Recorded breeding seabird and wader species are little penguin, short-tailed shearwater, white-faced storm petrel, Pacific gull, silver gull, sooty oystercatcher, pied oystercatcher, black-faced cormorant, Caspian tern and fairy tern. Reptiles present include the metallic Skink, White's skink, white-lipped snake and tiger snake.

== See also ==
- List of islands of Tasmania
