= Wardang Island =

Island in the Spencer Gulf, South Australia

Native name: Waralti
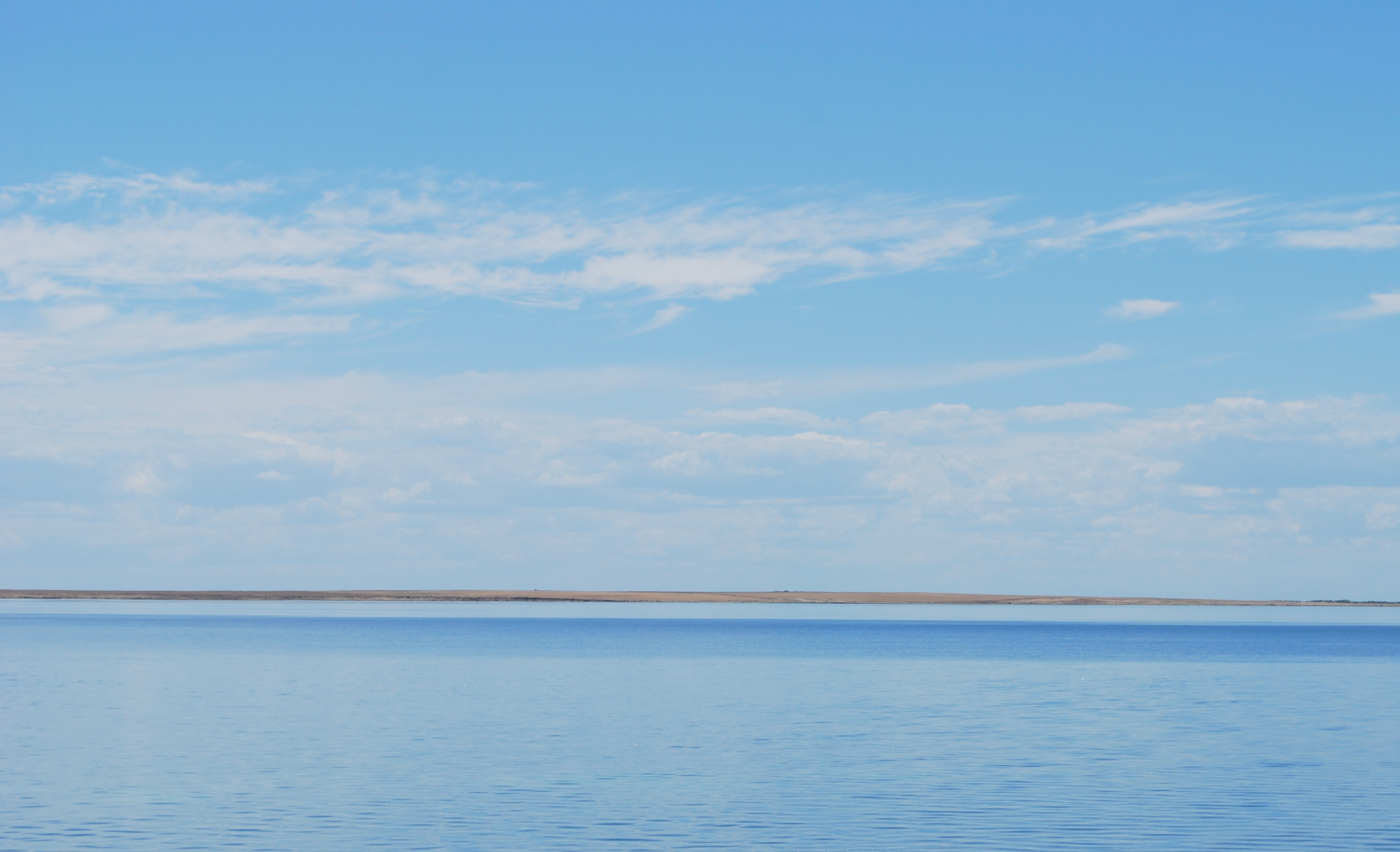
- Wardang Island viewed from Port Victoria

- Location within South Australia

Geography
- Location: Spencer Gulf
- Coordinates: 34°30′S 137°22′E

Administration
- Australia

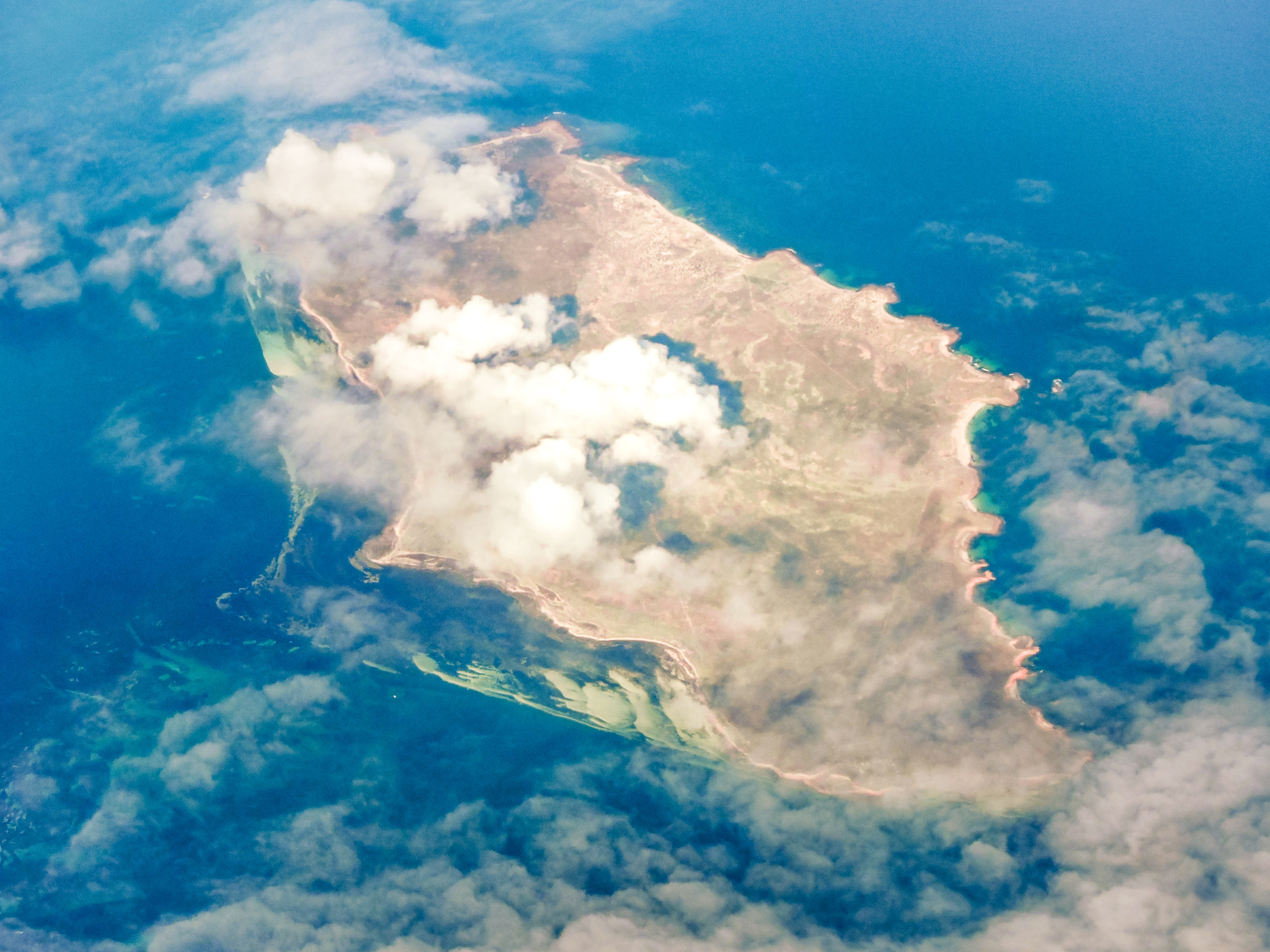
From the air

Wardang Island, also known as Waralti (also spelled Waraldi or Wauraltee) is a low-lying 20 km^{2} island in the Spencer Gulf close to the western coast of the Yorke Peninsula, South Australia. It acts as a natural breakwater, protecting the former grain port of Port Victoria and providing a sheltered anchorage. After European colonisation it was used for the grazing of sheep, for rabbit disease research, was quarried for lime to supply the lead smelter at Port Pirie and is currently leased to the island's traditional owners: the Narungga. The much smaller Goose Island and the other rocks and islets in the Goose Island Conservation Park lie off the northern end. Anyone seeking to visit the island must obtain prior permission from the Point Pearce Community Council.

== Nomenclature ==
Both names for the island are indigenous words. Wardang means "crow" while Wauraltee means "bandicoot island".

== History ==
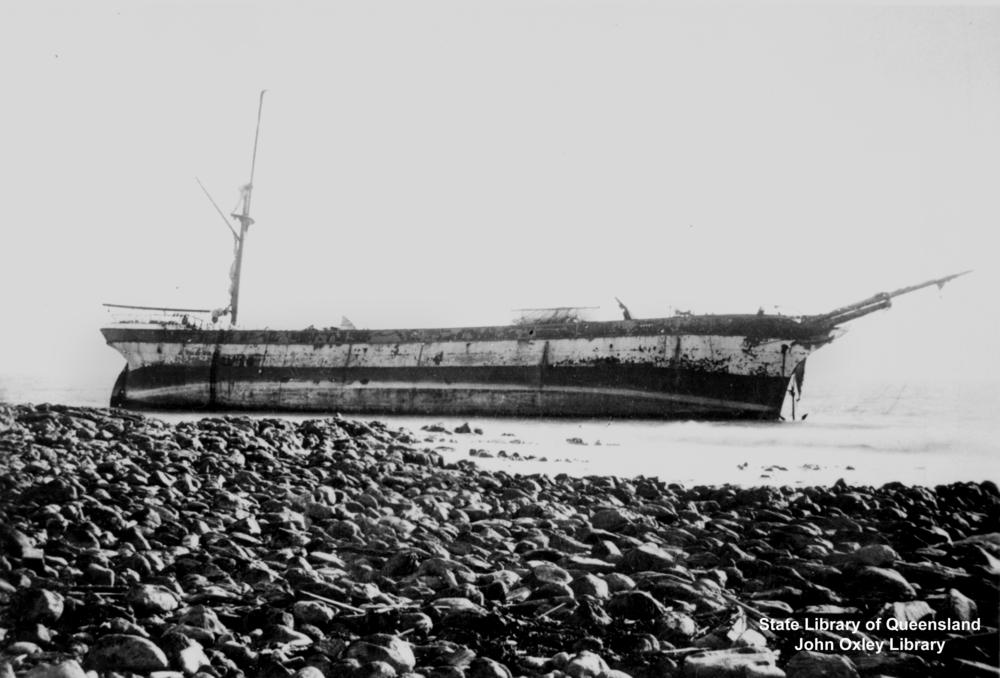
The remains of the Aagot, not long after it was wrecked in 1907

The island is part of the traditional lands of the Narungga people of the Yorke Peninsula who camped there regularly to hunt and gather food including shellfish, fish and the eggs of seabirds. Ceremony was also conducted there, including burials.

Following the European settlement of South Australia, the first pastoral lease on Wardang Island was issued in 1861 to Stephen Goldsworthy for a term of 14 years. Natural vegetation was cleared and replaced with sown pasture.

The lease gave the Narungga the continued right to travel to and from the island. In 1884 Goldsworthy transferred the lease to the Point Pearce, a mission for Aboriginal Australians, then known as the Yorke Peninsula Aboriginal Mission, "for the use and benefits of the inhabitants of the province".

In 1877, the island was considered as a candidate site for a permanent quarantine station for South Australia, but was ultimately rejected.

The mission used the island to graze sheep. Shearing sheds were built as well as living quarters to cater for the families living there. Mineral leases were later issued for the quarrying of lime. From 1915 the mission became an Aboriginal reserve under state government control, part of the Point Pearce Aboriginal Station.

The Aboriginal reserve on Wardang Island was abolished in 1948 and access was restricted while quarrying continued. However, in 1975 the South Australian government returned Wardang Island to the Aboriginal Lands Trust and it became part of Point Pearce Community Council.

=== Lighthouse and shipwrecks ===
In 1909 a lighthouse was erected at the highest point on the island's West coast to serve the large number of ships visiting nearby Port Victoria, though its effectiveness was limited by low visibility. The lighthouse tower from Wedge Island was moved to Wardang Island on 23 July 1918 where it replacing the previous light, which was simply supported by a post. The Wedge Island light was a Chance Bros 250mm lens. In 1988 the navigation light from Wedge Island was converted to solar power and the old tower was replaced with a fibreglass hut.

Accounts of the total number of shipping casualties and wrecks around Wardang Island vary. Between the years 1898 and 1929, there were at least 18 shipping casualties in the vicinity, of which eleven were total wrecks. It was reported that in 1916, ten wrecks lined the island's coast. In 1926, Wardang Island was referred to as "The Island of Wrecks" by The World's News.

The Advertiser published the claim that prior to 1950, twenty-two shipwrecks had occurred in the vicinity of the island.

The legacy of shipping losses has made the waters around Wardang Island popular with recreational divers interested in wreck diving. A dive trail showcases eight of nine identified shipwrecks around the island, which are associated with the trading port of Port Victoria in the early 1900s. Of the wrecks, five are of schooners and coastal steamers – the Monarch, S.S. Australian, S.S. Investigator, MacIntyre and Moorara – that carried wheat and other local cargo, and three – the Aagot, Notre Dame D'Arvor and Songvaar – are larger vessels that transported grain to Europe.

The dive trail is also known as the Wardang Island Maritime Heritage Trail.

Ship	Origin	Vessel class	Year	Day	Fate	Notes	Maritime Heritage Trail node	References
Candida	(United Kingdom)	British barque	1898	February 20	Refloated in April.	Crew survived and traveled to Wallaroo after the incident. Captain was found responsible. Cargo was saved. Ship was refloated and beached at North Arm, Port Adelaide.	No	
Maid of Australia	(United Kingdom)	British ketch	1899	July	Sunk	Sank off west coast of Wardang Island with a cargo of flux. Refloat unsuccessful. Crew survived. Captain found negligent.	No	
Lady Daly		Schooner	1901	December 30	Refloated and repaired.	Driven ashore during a gale. Ship abandoned. Salvage attempts made. Was refloated successfully and repaired.	No	
Cockermouth			1905	November	Refloated.	Grounded after leaving Port Victoria with wheat bound for England. Cargo unloaded. Damage to hull suspected.	No	
Torridor			1907					
Aagot	(Norway)	Norwegian barque	1907	October 12	Sunk	Traveling from Semaphore to Port Victoria. Wrecked at West Point, Wardang Island, under Captain Neilsen's command. Ship was abandoned and broke apart. All crew saved.	Yes	
Monarch		Schooner	1909	1 April	Sunk	Drifted onto rocks at Wardang Island.	Yes	
S.S. Australian		Steamer	1912	9 May	Sunk	Bound from Venus Bay to Port Victoria. Sank while loaded with 3200 bags of wheat on reef at the southern end of Wardang Island. Vessel was primarily used to load larger wheat transport ships. All hands saved. Vessel abandoned.	Yes	
Songvaar	(Norway)	Norwegian iron ship	1912	May	Sunk	Sank laden with a cargo of wheat. Attempts made to sell both cargo and wrecked vessel. Sold at auction as a salvage prospect.	Yes	
Jean Bart	(France)	French barque	1913	March 7	Salvaged, repaired and renamed "Wardang"	En route from Antwerp to Wallaroo with a cargo of coke and pig iron. Wrecked on west coast of Wardang Island. All hands saved. Refloat attempted but failed. Sails destroyed by winds. Ship was incorrectly reported as having broken in half and sunk. It was salvaged and towed to Melbourne where it was repaired and sold under the new name Wardang. Later captured by British authorities off South Africa after the outbreak of World War I.	No	
General de Sonis	(France)	French	1913	March 12	Refloated. Torpedoed by German submarine in 1915.	Went ashore at Port Victoria laden with wheat.	No	
Albatross			1913	March 12	Sunk	Hit Eclipse Rock off Port Victoria during a gale. Crew rescued. Ship broke up half an hour after the rescue.	No	
Harold			1917					
S.S. Investigator			1918	May	Sunk	Adelaide Steamship Company vessel.	Yes	
Notre Dame D'Arvor	(France)	French barque	1920	March 20	Sunk	Ran into south-western point of Wardang Island, adjacent to the site where the Investigator previously ran aground. The vessel caught fire during an unsuccessful attempt to refloat her. Burned wreck was then sold for salvage. Her remains then served as a warning to other passing mariners.	Yes	
Eugene Schneider	(France)	French barque	1921	January	Refloated.	Captain mistook Port Victoria for Port Victor, and on approaching the wrong port, struck Eclipse Rock. Refloated and eventually arrived at Port Victor as originally intended.	No	
McIntyre		Schooner	1927	April 1	Sunk	Was laden with wheat and bound for Wallaroo when it grounded on a submerged reef on Wardang Island. All hands saved. Ship was "totally destroyed".	Yes	
Eclipse			1929					
Hawk			1948					
Silver Cloud			1974					
Moorara			1975		Sunk		Yes	

=== Quarrying and settlement ===
In 1900, mineral leases were issued over parts of the island. These were gradually acquired from 1910 by Broken Hill Associated Smelters (BHAS), and by 1939 they held all of the leases on the island. Until 1968 BHAS quarried lime sand on the island, and shipped it by barge to use as flux in smelters at Port Pirie.

A jetty was constructed in 1915 by BHP to facilitate the shipping of lime. In 1918, quarrying focused on deposits at the southern end of the island. A railway line was constructed to move the quarried lime from the southern deposits to the jetty at the northern end of the island. Initially the cartage was drawn by horses, then replaced by a kerosene driven locomotive. The railway was made redundant in the early 1950s and replaced with motor trucks. By 1951, 900,000 tonnes of lime had been quarried from Wardang Island and shipped to Port Pirie.

As the population of the island increased, BHAS built homes, a school and other infrastructure to provide for its employees and their families. In 1930, there were two jetties, a dance hall, a school, a playground, a "wireless" and fourteen houses present. In 1950 there were 47 people living on the island, 14 of whom were schoolchildren. The BHAS foreman, Mr J. W. Waters was the longest-term resident at that time, having lived there for 13 years.

When BHAS discovered limeshell deposits in Coffin Bay it surrendered its leases and abandoned the island. Guano was also quarried on Wardang Island.

The quarrying ceased in 1968. Between 1910 and 1968 over a million tons of sand was quarried from the island. The mobile dune at the south of the island has been completely removed, leaving only the fixed, vegetated dunes.

=== Indigenous use and restoration ===
In 1969, Wardang was made a fauna sanctuary.

In 1973 the island was declared a Historic Reserve and has been owned since by the Aboriginal Lands Trust.

In 1996, Wardang Island was described as "the most degraded" of South Australia's large offshore islands.

In 2014 the island was declared an Indigenous Protected Area in 2014.

In 2019, a project to rejuvenate the island was announced by Federal MP Rowan Ramsey and state MP Fraser Ellis with a combined funded value of close to AUD$4 million. The project involves the demolition of old buildings, removal of asbestos, and the construction of new facilities to be used by Indigenous rangers.

Federal funding has enabled the Aboriginal Lands Trust to buy a barge which will provide ongoing access to Wardang Island. Funding will also support Indigenous Protected Area activities, train Aboriginal people for seafaring work and the barge will become available for commercial use.

The Government of South Australia committed $1.3 million to the establishment of a new landing facility on the island. South Australian Premier Steven Marshall cited the tourism opportunity for shipwreck divers as one of the reasons for investing in the landing facility.

Greening Australia is undertaking re-vegetation work on the island with the goal of supporting the future reintroduction of regionally extinct animals to the island, including the Western quoll.

Anyone wishing to visit the island must obtain prior permission from the Point Pearce Community Council.

== Flora and fauna ==
The native flora of Wardang Island prominently features coast daisy-bush (Olearia axillaris) and grey samphire (Tecticornia halocnemoides). Other native species include some isolated She-oaks; umbrella wattle (some mature trees, many stunted by continual rabbit grazing) and some marsh saltbush. In 1996, it was speculated that the native reddish purple-to-pink flowering garland lily may survive in the grasslands.

Weeds are widespread on the island, and include common iceplant in thick mats in coastal areas, sea spurge in salt marshes, and clumps of African boxthorn, tree tobacco and horehound.

Emus are present on the island, and were introduced there during the 1970s as part of a short-lived tourism venture.

All of the mammals on the island are introduced. As of 1996, they included tammar wallabies, rabbits, feral cats, two camels and eight donkeys.

Reptiles are present on the island.

Wardang island is home to various seabirds, including silver gulls, terns, oystercatchers (once referred to as "redbills"), little penguins and cormorants. The bird life is acknowledged in the European names given to various geographical features of the island, including Pidgeon Rock and Pidgeon Island to the north and Bird Point and Swan Bay to the northeast. Snapper Point is another geographical feature named after local fauna; in this instance after a fish caught in adjacent waters. Another fish caught off Wardang Island is the Australian herring (known locally as tommy ruff).

The island historically supported native bandicoots and wild turkey.

=== Rabbits and rabbit disease research ===
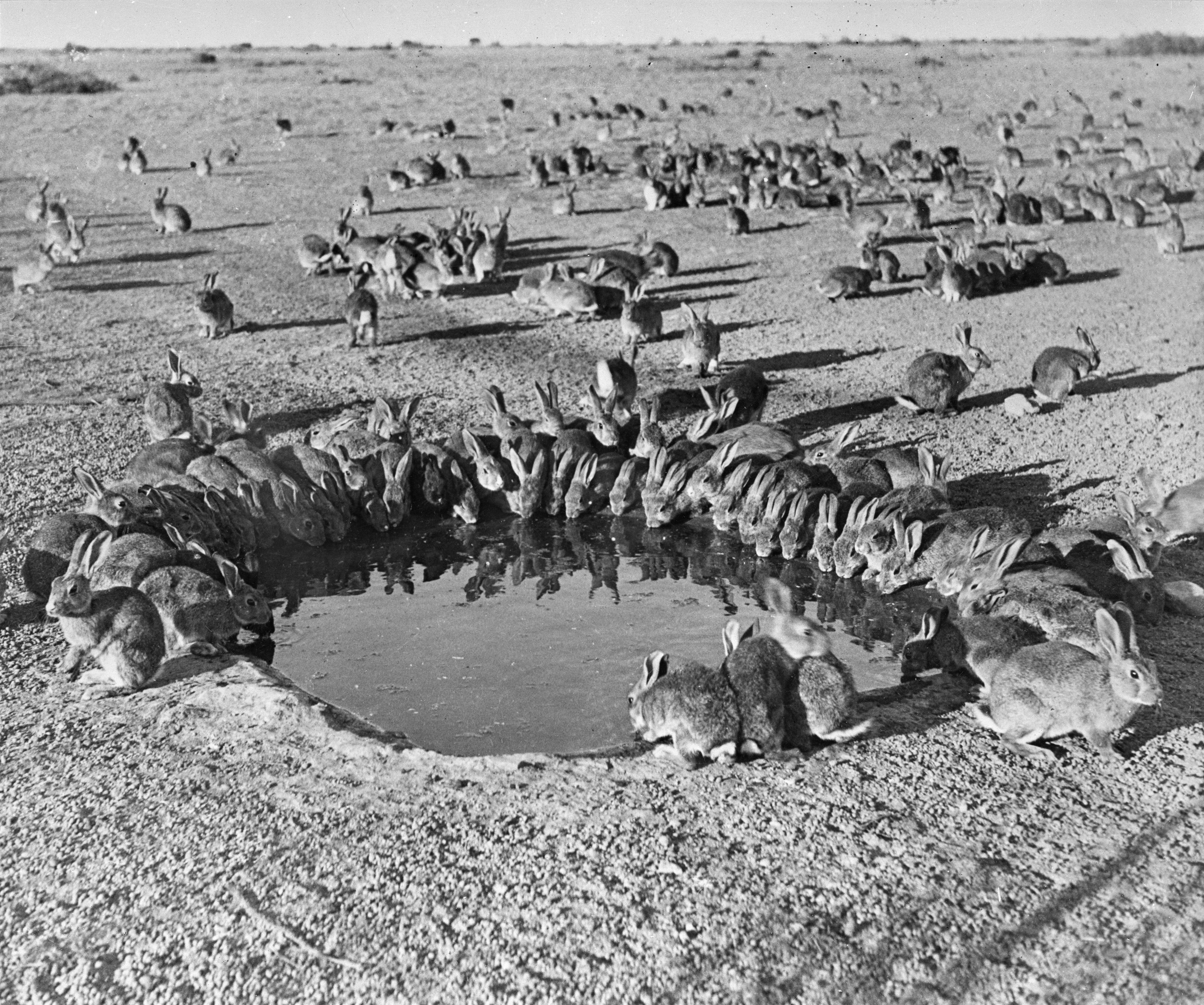
Rabbits at a waterhole within the myxomatosis trial site on Wardang in 1938

An anecdotal account suggested that rabbits were introduced to the island by fishermen circa 1922 but rabbiting parties had visited the Wardang Island much earlier and it was reported that the island "teemed with rabbits" in 1875. It is not known when or by whom the animals were first introduced to the island.

In November 1937, the CSIRO began to use Wardang to conduct its first field trials of myxomatosis, establishing the methodology for the first successful release of the myxoma virus throughout the country in the early 1950s. The myxomatosis program was a successful pioneering experiment in the biological control of pest mammals, reducing Australia's wild rabbit population from 600 million to 100 million in only two years.

In March 1995 trials started on Wardang Island of the rabbit calicivirus causing rabbit haemorrhagic disease. In October that year the virus escaped prematurely from the island to the mainland, believed to have been carried by bushflies on the afternoon sea breezes, and spread rapidly through the country. It initially caused widespread mortality among the wild rabbit population but, like myxomatosis before it, has not led to extermination of the pest species.

=== Little penguin colony ===
Wardang Island was previously home to the second largest breeding colony of little penguins in South Australia and the largest colony in the state's gulf waters. Captain E. H. Hipkins said that an Italian ship ran aground on Wardang Island some time prior to 1938, and the crew had mistaken the calls of penguins for those of fearsome wild animals.

Penguins were known to be abundant on the island in 1874, were seen by visitors on The Zephyr in 1875 and were seen in Mungari bay to the north of Wardang Island by yachtsmen in 1895. In 1928, 1930, 1931, 1934 and 1937, Wardang Island was described as a home to many penguins. In 1937 the island was described as being "infested with thousands of penguins". In 1944, the colony was described in the Port Pirie newspaper The Recorder:

"The north and north west coasts of the island consist of precipitous limestone cliffs. Heavy westerlies have undermined these cliffs and large portions of rock have fallen to the sea bed, where waves have pounded them into weird shapes. Up on top, penguins are very numerous and they make their nests in shallow burrows. There are hundreds of such nests."

In 1946, Mr. Pim wrote of Wardang Island:

"On the west coast... colonies of penguins are at home to anyone who cares to call."

Their presence was noted in 1950 by Edna Davies who advised that if anyone visited the island and stayed until nightfall that they would see and hear the penguins coming ashore. Penguins were also seen during a visit by Governor Norrie in 1950. In 1966, a visitor described seeing "hundreds" of fairy penguins on Wardang Island. In 1981, penguins were considered abundant. In 2004, Wardang Island was estimated to support approximately 8,000 penguins, though the methodology behind this estimate is unpublished.

In 2005, the Point Pearce Community was involved in feral cat trapping work. This was undertaken to reduce feral cat predation on little penguins. As of 2011, the penguin colony's status is unknown, though indications of decline from historic abundance was noted in 1996.

== See also ==
- List of islands of Australia
- List of little penguin colonies
