= List of islands of Tasmania =

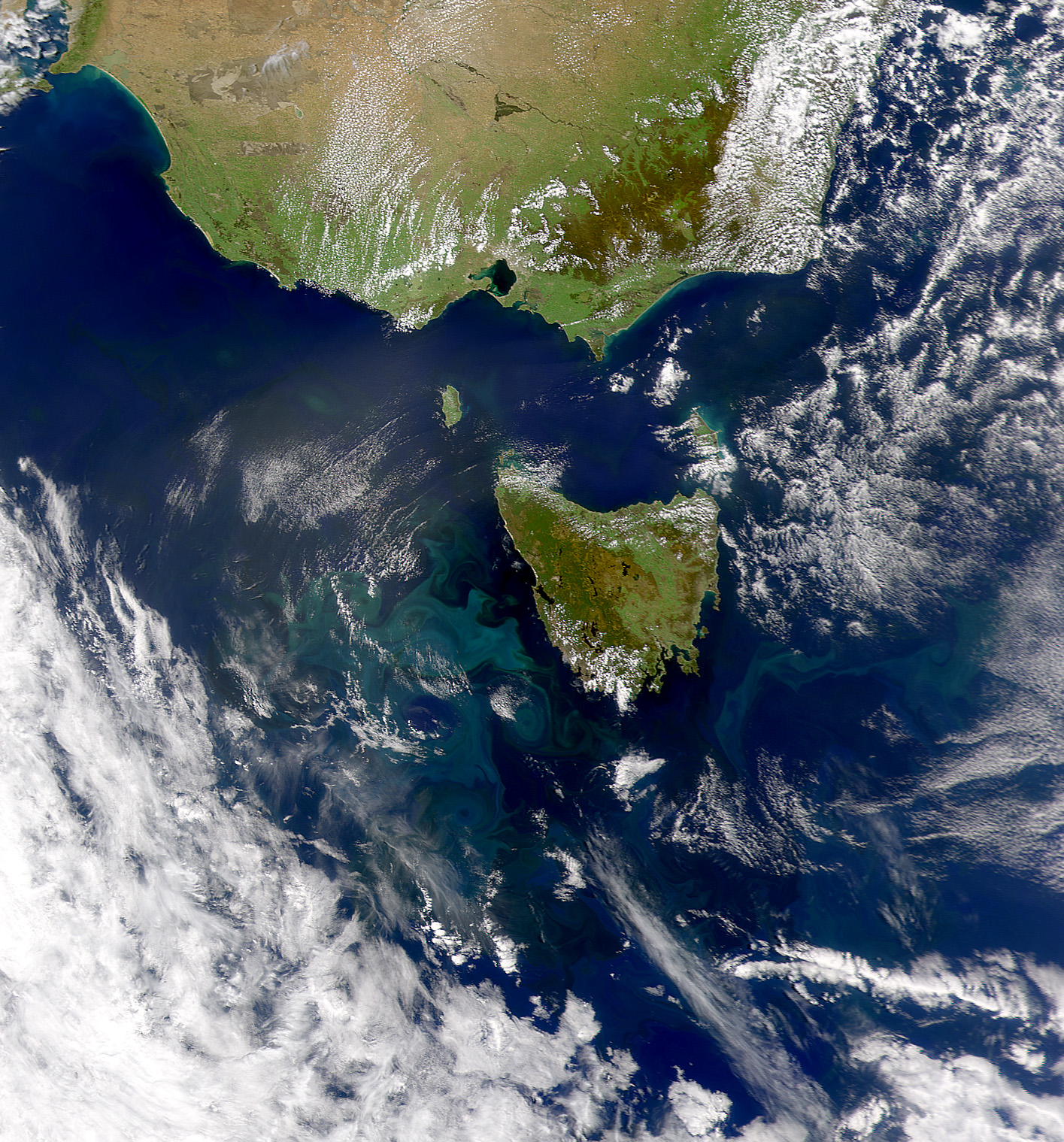
A satellite image of Tasmania while a phytoplankton bloom is off the west coast of Tasmania.

Tasmania is the smallest and southernmost state of Australia. The Tasmanian mainland itself is an island, with an area of 64,519 km^{2} (24,911 sq mi) - 94.1% of the total land area of the state. There are more than 1000 smaller islands which have a combined area of 4,055 km^{2} (1,566 sq mi), making up the remaining 5.9% of total land area.

== Classification structure ==
A considerable number of Tasmanian islands are identified as being in island groups, including the Breaksea, Furneaux, Hogan, Hunter, Kent, Maatsuyker, Mutton Bird, New Year, Swainson, Trumpeter, and Waterhouse groups.

=== Regions ===
Similar to Regions of Tasmania the islands are generally distinguished by the coast that they are adjacent to, as well as Bass Strait - the main separation from the mainland state of Victoria. Five regions are aligned to the north coast and Bass Strait - North West Islands (including King Island), North Coast Islands, North Bass Strait Islands, Furneaux Islands, and North East Islands. The southern groups are South and West Islands, and East Coast Islands.

=== Status ===
There are 334 islands within the state of Tasmania. Only sixteen of these 334 islands are listed as private islands. The majority of these sixteen private islands have a conservation covenant associated with their title restricting future development, whilst a small minority have a freehold title.

== List of islands ==
| Island, islet or rock name | Location (body of water) | Group | Area | | Population 2021 census (unless otherwise) | Land use | Ref |
| Island, islet or rock name | Location (body of water) | Group | ha | acre | Population 2021 census (unless otherwise) | Land use | Ref |
|---|---|---|---|---|---|---|---|
| Albatross | Bass Strait | Hunter | 18 | 44 | unpopulated | | |
| Anderson | Bass Strait | Furneaux | 166 | 410 | unpopulated | Pastoral lease | |
| Babel | Bass Strait | Furneaux | 440 | 1,087 | unpopulated | Private Freehold title: Tasmanian Aboriginal community | |
| Badger | Bass Strait | Furneaux | 1,242 | 3,069 | | Private Freehold title: grazing | |
| Barren | Tasman Sea | Sloping | 0.53 | 1 | | | |
| Bass | Bass Strait | Furneaux | 0.01 | 0 | unpopulated | Nature reserve | |
| Battery | Bass Strait | Furneaux | 0.68 | 2 | unpopulated | | |
| Baynes | Bass Strait | Waterhouse | 1.62 | 4 | unpopulated | | |
| Beagle | Bass Strait | Furneaux | 1.2 | 3 | unpopulated | Nature reserve | |
| Betsey | Tasman Sea | | 175.1 | 433 | | Nature reserve | |
| Big Caroline | Southern Ocean | Swainson | 6.69 | 17 | | | |
| Big Green | Bass Strait | Furneaux | 122 | 301 | unpopulated | Nature reserve | |
| Big Black | Bass Strait | Furneaux | 0.54 | 1 | unpopulated | | |
| Billy Goat | Bass Strait | Furneaux | 1.3 | 3 | unpopulated | | |
| Bird | Bass Strait | Waterhouse | 1 | 2 | unpopulated | | |
| Bishop and Clerk | South-western Pacific Ocean | | 60 | 148 | unpopulated | World Heritage Site | |
| Boomer | Tasman Sea | | 35.21 | 87 | Private | Freehold title | |
| Boundary (historically called North East) | Bass Strait | Hogan | 2 | 5 | unpopulated | Crown land | |
| Breaksea, North; Breaksea, Main | Southern Ocean | Breaksea | 16 | 40 | unpopulated | Southwest National Park | |
| Bruny | Tasman Sea | Bruny | 35,300 | 87,228 | 220^{a} | Various | |
| Cape Barren | Bass Strait | Furneaux | 46,500 | 114,904 | see Flinders Island | Aboriginal | |
| Cat | Bass Strait | Furneaux | 39 | 96 | unpopulated | | |
| Chalky | Bass Strait | Furneaux | 41 | 101 | unpopulated | Nature reserve | |
| Chicken | Southern Ocean | Maatsuyker | 195 | 482 | unpopulated | Southwest National Park | |
| Christmas | Great Australian Bight | New Year | 63 | 156 | unpopulated | | |
| Clarke | Bass Strait | Furneaux | 8,200 | 20,263 | see Flinders Island | Aboriginal | |
| Coffee Pot, The | Southern Ocean | Trumpeter | 0.31 | 1 | | | |
| Councillor | Bass Strait | New Year | 10.53 | 26 | unpopulated | | |
| Cygnet | Bass Strait | Waterhouse | 0.5 | 1 | unpopulated | | |
| Dart | Tasman Sea | | 12.8 | 32 | | | |
| Deal | Bass Strait | Kent | 1,576.75 | 3,896 | - | Kent Group National Park | |
| De Witt | Southern Ocean | Maatsuyker | 517 | 1,278 | - | Southwest National Park | |
| Doughboy | Bass Strait | Furneaux | 30 | 74 | unpopulated | | |
| Dover | Bass Strait | Kent | 295 | 729 | - | Kent Group National Park | |
| East | Bass Strait | Hogan | 12.42 | 31 | - | Crown land | |
| East Kangaroo | Bass Strait | Furneaux | 157 | 388 | unpopulated | Nature reserve | |
| East Pyramids | Southern Ocean | Mutton Bird | 6.69 | 17 | | | |
| Eddystone; Pedra Branca; Sidmouth | Southern Ocean (South East Cape) | | 2 | 5 | unpopulated | Southwest National Park | |
| Erith | Bass Strait | Kent | 323 | 798 | unpopulated | Kent Group National Park | |
| Fitzroy | | Breaksea | 0.18 | 0.44 | | | |
| Flat Top | Southern Ocean | Maatsuyker | 1.58 | 4 | unpopulated | Southwest National Park | |
| Flat Witch | Southern Ocean | Maatsuyker | 64 | 158 | unpopulated | Southwest National Park | |
| Flinders | Bass Strait | Furneaux | 134,000 | 331,121 | 922^{b} | Various | |
| Forsyth | Bass Strait | Furneaux | 167 | 410 | | | |
| Foster | Bass Strait | Waterhouse | 48 | 119 | unpopulated | | |
| Fulham | Tasman Sea | Sloping | 10 | 25 | unpopulated | Private Freehold title (possible future restrictions) | |
| George | Bass Strait | Waterhouse | 7 | 17 | unpopulated | | |
| Goat | Bass Strait | | 5.4 | 13 | unpopulated | Three Sisters-Goat Island Nature Reserve | |
| Goose | Bass Strait | Furneaux | 109 | 269 | unpopulated | Conservation area | |
| Grave Island | Tasman Sea | | 0.2 | 0 | | | |
| Great Dog | Bass Strait | Furneaux | 354 | 875 | 10 (2004) | Private Freehold title | |
| Gull | Bass Strait | Furneaux | 8.5 | 21 | | | |
| Hay | Southern Ocean | Swainson | 1.85 | 5 | | | |
| Hen | Southern Ocean | Maatsuyker | 7.6 | 19 | unpopulated | Southwest National Park | |
| Hibbs Pyramid | Southern Ocean | Hibbs Pyramid | 4.65 | 11 | unpopulated | Southwest National Park | |
| Hippolyte | Tasman Sea | | 5.3 | 12.5 | | | |
| Hobbs | Southern Ocean | Trumpeter | 9.7 | 24 | | | |
| Hog | Bass Strait | Sloping | 0.35 | 1 | | Nature reserve | |
| Hogan | Bass Strait | Hogan | 232 | 573 | unpopulated | Crown land | |
| Hunter | Bass Strait | Hunter | 7,100 | 17,544 | unpopulated | Crown lease | |
| Ile des Phoques | Tasman Sea | | 8.05 | 20 | | Nature reserve | |
| Ile du Golfe | Southern Ocean | Maatsuyker | 68 | 168 | unpopulated | Southwest National Park | |
| Ile du Nord | Tasman Sea | Maria | 10 | 25 | unpopulated | Maria Island National Park | |
| Inner Little | Bass Strait | Furneaux | 4.5 | 11 | unpopulated | Conservation area | |
| Inner | Southern Ocean | | 0.23 | 1 | | | |
| Inner Sister | Bass Strait | Furneaux | 748 | 1,850 | | | |
| Iron Pot | Tasman Sea | | 1.27 | 3 | | | |
| Isabella | Bass Strait | Furneaux | 11.4 | 28 | unpopulated | Nature reserve | |
| Isle of Caves | Tasman Sea | | 1.4 | 3 | | | |
| Judge and Clerk | South-western Pacific Ocean | | 20 | 49 | unpopulated | World Heritage Site | |
| Judgement | Bass Strait | Kent | 0.39 | 1 | unpopulated | Kent Group National Park | |
| Kathleen | Southern Ocean | Breaksea | 11.35 | 28 | | | |
| Ketchem Island | Southern Ocean | Mutton Bird | 3 | 10 | unpopulated | World Heritage Site | |
| King | Bass Strait | New Year | 109,400 | 270,333 | 1,617 | Various | |
| King George | Tasman Sea | Sloping | 19.8 | 49 | 2^{d} (2018) | Private Freehold Title to high water mark with conservation covenant on part | |
| Lachlan | Tasman Sea | | 2.5 | 6 | | | |
| Lanterns, The | Tasman Sea | Tasman | 5.35 | 13 | unpopulated | Tasman National Park | |
| Little Badger | Bass Strait | Furneaux | 2.5 | 6 | unpopulated | Nature reserve | |
| Little Betsey | Tasman Sea | | 0.75 | 2 | | Nature reserve | |
| Little Chalky | Bass Strait | Furneaux | 5 | 12 | unpopulated | | |
| Little Dog | Bass Strait | Furneaux | 83 | 205 | | | |
| Little Goose | Bass Strait | Furneaux | 3.6 | 9 | unpopulated | Nature reserve | |
| Little Green | Bass Strait | Furneaux | 87 | 210 | | | |
| Little Spectacle | Tasman Sea | Sloping | 0.62 | 2 | unpopulated | | |
| Little Swan | Bass Strait | Waterhouse | 12.64 | 31 | unpopulated | | |
| Little Waterhouse | Bass Strait | Waterhouse | 2.5 | 6 | unpopulated | | |
| Long (Furneaux) | Bass Strait | Furneaux | 313 | 773 | unpopulated | Grazing | |
| Long (Hogan) | Bass Strait | Hogan | 22.85 | 56 | unpopulated | Crown land | |
| Louisa | Southern Ocean | Maatsuyker | 23.04 | 57 | unpopulated | Southwest National Park | |
| Lourah | Southern Ocean | Swainson | 4.86 | 12 | | | |
| Low (Prime Seal Group) | Bass Strait | Furneaux | 2 | 4.9 | | | |
| Maatsuyker | Southern Ocean | Maatsuyker | 186 | 460 | unpopulated | Southwest National Park | |
| Maclean | Bass Strait | Waterhouse | 1.11 | 3 | unpopulated | | |
| Macquarie | South-western Pacific Ocean | | 12,400 | 30,641 | unpopulated | World Heritage Site | |
| Maria | Tasman Sea | Maria | 10,100 | 24,958 | unpopulated | Maria Island National Park | |
| Mavourneen | Southern Ocean | Breaksea | 0.88 | 2 | | | |
| Mewstone | Southern Ocean | Pedra Branca | 13.1 | 32 | | | |
| Mile | Bass Strait | Furneaux | 4 | 10 | unpopulated | Conservation area | |
| Mount Chappell | Bass Strait | Furneaux | 323 | 798 | unpopulated | Private Freehold title: grazing | |
| Munday | Southern Ocean | Breaksea | 16 | 40 | | | |
| Mutton Bird (southeast) | Southern Ocean | Mutton Bird | 0.52 | 1 | | | |
| Mutton Bird (southwest) | Southern Ocean | Mutton Bird | 0.52 | 1 | | | |
| Needle | Southern Ocean | Maatsuyker | 10.5 | 26 | unpopulated | Southwest National Park | |
| New Year | Great Australian Bight | New Year | 98.22 | 243 | unpopulated | | |
| Night | Bass Strait | Furneaux | 2.59 | 6.7 | | | |
| Ninth | Bass Strait | Waterhouse | 32 | 79 | unpopulated | | |
| North East | Bass Strait | Kent | 32.62 | 81 | unpopulated | Kent Group National Park | |
| North West Mount Chappell | Bass Strait | Furneaux | 0.71 | 2 | unpopulated | | |
| Paddys | Bass Strait | Waterhouse | 4.6 | 11 | unpopulated | | |
| Partridge | Tasman Sea | Partridge | 103 | 255 | unpopulated | South Bruny National Park | |
| Passage | Bass Strait | Furneaux | 253 | 630 | | | |
| Pelican | Bass Strait | Furneaux | 6.8 | 17 | unpopulated | | |
| Penguin | Bass Strait | North Coast | 2.73 | 7 | unpopulated | | |
| Perkins | Bass Strait | | 2.8 | 7 | | | |
| Philips | Macquarie Harbour | | 2.8 | 7 | | | |
| Preservation | Bass Strait | Furneaux | 207 | 512 | | | |
| Prime Seal | Bass Strait | Furneaux | 1,220 | 3159.8 | | | |
| Puncheon | Bass Strait | Furneaux | 17.56 | 43 | 1 | Private | |
| Ram | Bass Strait | Furneaux | 1 | 2 | | Private | |
| Reynolds | Great Lake | | 6,677 | 16,500 | | | |
| Robbins | Bass Strait | Robbins | 9,900 | 24,463 | unpopulated | Private | |
| Rodondo | Bass Strait | Rodondo | 106 | 262 | unpopulated | Nature reserve | |
| Round | Bass Strait | Hogan | 153 | 378 | unpopulated | Crown land | |
| Round Top | Southern Ocean | Maatsuyker | 6.25 | 15 | unpopulated | Southwest National Park | |
| Roydon | Bass Strait | Furneaux | 37 | 95.83 | | | |
| Rum | Bass Strait | Furneaux | 13.5 | 34.96 | | | |
| St Helens | Bass Strait | Waterhouse | 51 | 126 | unpopulated | Conservation area | |
| Sarah | Macquarie Harbour | | 8 | 20 | | Historic site | |
| Satellite | Tasman Sea | | 34 | 84 | | | |
| Schouten | Tasman Sea | | 2,800 | 6,919 | unpopulated | Freycinet National Park | |
| Seal | Bass Strait | Hogan | 294.37 | 762.41 | unpopulated | Crown land | |
| Shanks | Southern Ocean | Swainson | 2.72 | 7 | | | |
| Sloping | Tasman Sea | Sloping | 117.2 | 290 | unpopulated | Nature reserve | |
| Sidmouth | Southern Ocean | | 10.563 | 27.358 | | | |
| Smooth | Tasman Sea | Sloping | 59.31 | 147 | 3^{d} (2018) | Private Freehold title | |
| South Black | Bass Strait | Hunter | 1 | 2 | unpopulated | Bird reserve | |
| South Pasco | Bass Strait | Furneaux | 21 | 54.39 | | | |
| Southport | Tasman Sea | | 7 | 18.13 | | | |
| South West | Bass Strait | Kent | 19.09 | 47 | unpopulated | Kent Group National Park | |
| Spectacle | Tasman Sea | Sloping | 3.5 | 9 | unpopulated | | |
| Storehouse | Bass Strait | Furneaux | 20 | 49 | unpopulated | | |
| Sugarloaf | Southern Ocean | Mutton Bird | 3.56 | 9 | | | |
| Sugarmouse | Southern Ocean | Mutton Bird | 0.54 | 1 | | | |
| Swainson | Southern Ocean | Swainson | 4.14 | 10 | | | |
| Swan | Bass Strait | Waterhouse | 239 | 591 | unpopulated | | |
| Taillefer | Tasman Sea | | 15 | 37 | | | |
| Tasman | Tasman Sea | | 0.46 | 1.2 | | | |
| Tenth | Bass Strait | Waterhouse | 0.9 | 2 | unpopulated | | |
| Three Hummock | Bass Strait | Hunter | 7,000 | 17,297 | unpopulated | Crown lease | |
| Three Sisters | Bass Strait (North-west coast) | | 2 | 5 | unpopulated | Three Sisters-Goat Island Nature Reserve | |
| Tin Kettle | Bass Strait | Furneaux | 176 | 455.84 | | | |
| Tinpot | Norfolk Bay | | 1.24 | 3 | unpopulated | Nature reserve | |
| Trefoil | Bass Strait | Trefoil Island Group | 115.79 | 299.89 | | | |
| Twin | Bass Strait | Hogan | 5.61 | 14 | unpopulated | Crown land | |
| Vansittart | Bass Strait | Furneaux | 800 | 1,977 | | | ^{c} |
| Visscher | Tasman Sea | Sloping | 3.4 | 8 | unpopulated | Tasman National Park | |
| Walker (northwest) | Bass Strait (North-west coast) | Robbins | 700 | 1,730 | unpopulated | Private | |
| Walker (southwest) | Southern Ocean | Maatsuyker | 15.3 | 38 | unpopulated | Southwest National Park | |
| Waterhouse | Bass Strait | Waterhouse | 287 | 709 | unpopulated | Conservation area/Crown land | |
| Wedge | Tasman Sea | Tasman | 42.58 | 105 | unpopulated | | |
| Wendar | Southern Ocean | Mutton Bird | 5.8 | 14 | | | |
| West | Southern Ocean | Trumpeter | 2.5 | 6 | | | |
| Western | Southern Ocean | Maatsuyker | 29 | 72 | unpopulated | Southwest National Park | |
| Wild Wind | Southern Ocean | Mutton Bird | 3.95 | 10 | | | |
| Woody | Tasman Sea | Sloping | 28.3 | 73.29 | unpopulated | | |
| Wybalenna | Bass Strait | Furneaux | 26 | 41.44 | | | |

=== Notes ===
^a: Combined 2021 census data for North Bruny and South Bruny Islands.
^b: 2021 census data is for the entire Flinders Council (Furneaux Group) which includes Cape Barren Island and Clarke Island.
^c: Errol Anderson, family arrived on Vansittart Cutter, island was named for, 26 January 1836, Hobart Town.
^d: Source: Direct observation by editor

== See also ==
- Tasmania's offshore islands
