= List of shipwrecks in July 1840 =

The list of shipwrecks in July 1840 includes ships sunk, foundered, wrecked, grounded, or otherwise lost during July 1840.

== 1 July ==
List of shipwrecks: 1 July 1840
| Ship | State | Description |
|---|---|---|
| Eleanor | United Kingdom | The ship ran aground in the Bird Islands. She was on a voyage from Quebec City, Lower Canada, British North America to North Shields, County Durham. |
| Roden | United Kingdom | The ship was wrecked on Langlade Island, Miquelon. Her crew were rescued. She was on a voyage from Miramichi, New Brunswick, British North America to Gloucester. |

== 2 July ==
List of shipwrecks: 2 July 1840
| Ship | State | Description |
|---|---|---|
| August Marie | France | The lugger was wrecked at Beachy Head, Sussex, United Kingdom Her crew were rescued. She was on a voyage from "Varmes" to Boulogne, Pas-de-Calais. |
| Mary | United Kingdom | The ship ran aground on the Holme Sand. She was on a voyage from Bruges, Belgium to Arbroath, Forfarshire. Mary was later refloated. |
| Superior, and Thomas | United Kingdom | The ships collided in the River Avon and were both beached at Pill, Somerset. |

== 3 July ==
List of shipwrecks: 3 July 1840
| Ship | State | Description |
|---|---|---|
| Jason | Prussia | The brig capsized in a squall at Liverpool, Lancashire, United Kingdom. |
| Thomas and Adah | United Kingdom | The ship ran aground on the Kentish Knock. She was refloated and put into Great Yarmouth, Norfolk. |
| Unnamed | France | The lugger was wrecked at Birling Gap, Sussex, United Kingdom. Her four crew were rescued by rocket apparatus. |

== 4 July ==
List of shipwrecks: 4 July 1840
| Ship | State | Description |
|---|---|---|
| Swift | United Kingdom | The smack was wrecked on the Sunderland Bank, in the Irish Sea. Her crew were rescued. She was on a voyage from Lancaster to Fleetwood, Lancashire. |

== 5 July ==
List of shipwrecks: 5 July 1840
| Ship | State | Description |
|---|---|---|
| Catherine | United Kingdom | The sloop was driven ashore and capsized at North Queensferry, Fife. She was on a voyage from Stirling to Hartlepool, County Durham. Catherine was refloated on 6 January and taken into St. Davids, Fife. |
| Jantina | Netherlands | The ship ran aground on the Banjaard Bank, in the North Sea. She was on a voyage from Cardiff, Glamorgan, United Kingdom to Rotterdam, South Holland. Jantina was refloated and taken into Brouwershaven, Zeeland. |
| L'Etienne | France | The ship was discovered abandoned in the North Sea. She was on a voyage from Sunderland, County Durham, United Kingdom to a French port. L'Etienne was taken into Great Yarmouth, Norfolk, United Kingdom. |
| Lisbon | Portugal | The ship was destroyed by fire in the Atlantic Ocean. Seven crew were rescued by Julie (United Kingdom). Lisbon was on a voyage from Faro to Glasgow, Renfrewshire, United Kingdom. |
| Marys | United Kingdom | The brig ran aground at Port Madoc, Caernarfonshire. |
| Regina | United Kingdom | The ship ran aground off Texel, North Holland, Netherlands. She was on a voyage from London to Königsberg, Prussia. Regina was later refloated and taken into Tønning, Duchy of Holstein. |

== 6 July ==
List of shipwrecks: 6 July 1840
| Ship | State | Description |
|---|---|---|
| Two Brothers | United Kingdom | The ship ran aground on the Gunfleet Sand, in the North Sea off the coast of Essex. She was refloated and taken into Harwich, Essex in a severely leaky condition. |

== 7 July ==
List of shipwrecks: 7 July 1840
| Ship | State | Description |
|---|---|---|
| Bithon | United Kingdom | The ship was wrecked on the Gelbsand, in the North Sea. Her crew were rescued She was on a voyage from Cuxhaven to Hartlepool, County Durham. |
| Helene | Hamburg | The ship was driven ashore at Port-au-Prince, Haiti. She was on a voyage from Port-au-Prince to Hamburg. Hellene was refloated the next day and resumed her voyage. |

== 8 July ==
List of shipwrecks: 8 July 1840
| Ship | State | Description |
|---|---|---|
| Euterpe | United Kingdom | The ship was wrecked on the Lafolle Reef. Her crew were rescued. She was on a voyage from Maracaibo, Venezuela to Liverpool, Lancashire. |
| Governor Endicott | United States | The whaler was wrecked at Leschenault, Swan River Colony. |
| North America | United States | The whaler was wrecked at Leschenault. |
| Quebec | United Kingdom | The ship ran aground on the Manicougan Shoals. She was on a voyage from Quebec City, Lower Canada, British North America to Sunderland, County Durham. Quebec was refloated in October and put back to Quebec City. |
| Samuel Wright | United States | The whaler was wrecked at Leschenault. |

== 10 July ==
List of shipwrecks: 10 July 1840
| Ship | State | Description |
|---|---|---|
| Arms | United Kingdom | The schooner was wrecked on the Vogel Sand, in the North Sea. She was on a voyage from Hamburg to Hull, Yorkshire. |
| City of Edinburgh | United Kingdom | The barque was wrecked on Flinders Island, South Australia. All on board were rescued. She was on a voyage from London to Sydney, New South Wales. |
| Ocean Queen | United Kingdom | The barque was driven ashore on Flinders Island. She was on a voyage from London to Launceston, Van Diemen's Land. |
| Richard and Ann | United Kingdom | The ship was driven ashore and wrecked on Eierland, North Holland, Netherlands. Her crew were rescued. She was on a voyage from Hamburg to London. |
| William | United Kingdom | The ship ran aground at Ifjord, Norway. She was on a voyage from Gothenburg, Sweden to London. William was later refloated and resumed her voyage. |

== 11 July ==
List of shipwrecks: 11 July 1840
| Ship | State | Description |
|---|---|---|
| City of Edinburgh | United Kingdom | The ship was wrecked on Prime Seal Island, Van Diemen's Land. Her crew survived. |
| Louisa | United Kingdom | The ship was wrecked on the North Sands. She was on a voyage from Penang to Singapore. |
| Paquette de Cádiz | Spain | The brig was wrecked on a reef 16 leagues (48 nautical miles (89 km)) off Nuevitas, Cuba with the loss of 77 lives. She was on a voyage from Puerto Principe, Haiti to Havana, Cuba. |

== 12 July ==
List of shipwrecks: 12 July 1840
| Ship | State | Description |
|---|---|---|
| Emerald | United Kingdom | The ship was wrecked on Cobbler's Rocks, off Barbados. Her crew were rescued. She was on a voyage from London to Saint Vincent, Virgin Islands. |

== 15 July ==
List of shipwrecks: 15 July 1840
| Ship | State | Description |
|---|---|---|
| Gertrude | Netherlands | The ship ran aground on a reef off Dyngö, Sweden. She was on a voyage from Danzig to Amsterdam, North Holland. Gertrude was refloated the next day and put into "Rüso". |
| Napoleon | United Kingdom | The ship was wrecked on the Cat Key. Her crew were rescued. She was on a voyage from New Orleans, Louisiana, United States to Liverpool, Lancashire. |
| Swallow | United Kingdom | The ship departed from Guayaquil, Ecuador for Cádiz, Spain. No further trace, presumed foundered in the Atlantic Ocean with the loss of all hands. |

== 16 July ==
List of shipwrecks: 16 July 1840
| Ship | State | Description |
|---|---|---|
| Credo | United Kingdom | The ship ran aground at Aberystwyth, Carmarthenshire and was severely damaged. She was on a voyage from Quebec City, Lower Canada, British North America to Aberystwyth. |
| Howard | United Kingdom | The barque was driven ashore and wrecked at the Cape of Good Hope. |
| Marquess of Wellington | United Kingdom | The ship struck sunken rocks in the Sound of Islay and was beached at Tobermory, Isle of Mull. |
| Paketa de Trieste | Trieste | The ship ran aground on Taylor's Bank, in Liverpool Bay. She was on a voyage from Liverpool, Lancashire, United Kingdom to Trieste. Paketa de Trieste was refloated and put back to Liverpool. |

== 17 July ==
List of shipwrecks: 17 July 1840
| Ship | State | Description |
|---|---|---|
| Blossom | (United Kingdom of Great Britain and Ireland) Van Diemen's Land | The schooner departed from Hobart for Adelaide, South Australia. No further trace, presumed foundered with the loss of all hands. |
| Margarethe Johanne | Danzig | The ship ran aground on the Leligrand. She was on a voyage from Danzig to London, United Kingdom. |
| Rawlings | United Kingdom | The barque ran aground in the Western Channel. She was on a voyage from London to Sydney, New South Wales. |

== 18 July ==
List of shipwrecks: 18 July 1840
| Ship | State | Description |
|---|---|---|
| Isabella | (United Kingdom of Great Britain and Ireland) New South Wales | The schooner was driven ashore and wrecked in the "Schrutten Passage". |

== 19 July ==
List of shipwrecks: 19 July 1840
| Ship | State | Description |
|---|---|---|
| Cerus | United Kingdom | The barque was driven ashore on Anticosti Island, Lower Canada, British North America. Her crew were rescued by the schooner St Peter (United Kingdom). Cerus was on a voyage from Quebec City, Lower Canada to Sligo. She was later refloated and taken into Quebec City. |
| Emulous | United Kingdom | The ship struck the Runnel Stone and sank. Her crew were rescued. She was on a voyage from a Welsh port to Penzance, Cornwall. |
| Cyrus | United Kingdom | The ship was driven ashore on Anticosti Island, Lower Canada, British North America. She was on a voyage from Quebec City, Lower Canada to Sligo. Cyrus was refloated in late October and taken into Quebec City. |
| Howard | United Kingdom | The ship was driven ashore and wrecked at the Cape of Good Hope. |

== 20 July ==
List of shipwrecks: 20 July 1840
| Ship | State | Description |
|---|---|---|
| Mary | United Kingdom | The ship ran aground on the Noose Sand, in the River Severn, capsized and sank. |

== 22 July ==
List of shipwrecks: 22 July 1840
| Ship | State | Description |
|---|---|---|
| Edward Reid | United Kingdom | The barque was wrecked on the Split Rock off the coast of New Brunswick, British North America. She was on a voyage from Londonderry to Saint John, New Brunswick. Some of the 104 passengers on board were rescued by the steamship Nova Scotia ( (United Kingdom of Great Britain and Ireland) British North America). |
| Woodman | United Kingdom | The ship collided with Neptune (United Kingdom) in the Bristol Channel 8 nautical miles (15 km) east north east of Lundy Island, Devon and sank. She was on a voyage from Swansea, Glamorgan to Great Yarmouth, Norfolk. |

== 23 July ==
List of shipwrecks: 23 July 1840
| Ship | State | Description |
|---|---|---|
| HMS Actaeon | Royal Navy | The sixth rate frigate ran aground at Buenos Aires, Argentina. She was refloated with assistance from USS Marion (United States Navy), French Navy and Royal Navy ships. HMS Actaeon was on a voyage from Buenos Aires to Montevideo, Uruguay. |
| Altorf | United States | The ship was driven ashore and wrecked near Cape Trafalgar, Spain. She was on a voyage from New Orleans, Louisiana to Marseille, Bouches-du-Rhône, France. |

== 24 July ==
List of shipwrecks: 24 July 1840
| Ship | State | Description |
|---|---|---|
| Johanna Williamina | Stettin | The galiot foundered west of South Uist, Outer Hebrides, United Kingdom. Her crew were rescued. She was on a voyage from Glasgow, Renfrewshire, United Kingdom to Stettin. |
| Victoria | Spain | The ship ran aground on the Cochinos Rock. She was on a voyage from Manila, Spanish East Indies to Cádiz. Victoria was refloated with assistance from Tagus (United Kingdom) and taken into Cádiz. |

== 25 July ==
List of shipwrecks: 25 July 1840
| Ship | State | Description |
|---|---|---|
| North Carolina | United States | The steamboat was in collision with Governor Dudley (United States) and sank 60 nautical miles (110 km) south of Wilmington, North Carolina. All on board were rescued by Governor Dudley. North Carolina was on a voyage from Wilmington to Charleston, South Carolina. |
| Two Brothers | United Kingdom | The brig ran aground on the Gunfleet Sand, in the North Sea off the coast of Essex. She was refloated with assistance from the steam tug Queen (United Kingdom). |

== 26 July ==
List of shipwrecks: 26 July 1840
| Ship | State | Description |
|---|---|---|
| Ann | United States | The schooner foundered off Tobago. She was on a voyage from Barbados to Philadelphia, Pennsylvania. |

== 28 July ==
List of shipwrecks: 28 July 1840
| Ship | State | Description |
|---|---|---|
| Ann | United Kingdom | The ship foundered off Tobago. Her crew were rescued. |
| HMS Buffalo | Royal Navy | The full-rigged ship was wrecked in Mercury Bay with the loss of two of her crew. |

== 29 July ==
List of shipwrecks: 29 July 1840
| Ship | State | Description |
|---|---|---|
| Caroline | Denmark | The ship sank in the Agger Channel. Her crew were rescued. |
| Harriet | United Kingdom | The ship foundered in the Indian Ocean with the loss of six of her crew. She was on a voyage from Île Bourbon to Mauritius. |

== Unknown date ==
List of shipwrecks: Unknown date in July 1840
| Ship | State | Description |
|---|---|---|
| Africa | United Kingdom | The ship was destroyed by fire at Jamaica in early July. |
| Ann | United Kingdom | The ship was wrecked on "Hochland" before 16 July. |
| Cora | France | The ship was driven ashore and wrecked near Havana, Cuba. She was on a voyage from Havana to Marseille, Bouches-du-Rhône. |
| Duke d'Aumaie | France | The ship was driven ashore near Cartagena, Spain before 7 July and was subsequently burnt. She was on a voyage from Port Vendres, Pyrénées-Orientales to Rouen, Seine-Inférieure. |
| I. O. | United Kingdom | The ship ran aground at Puerto Cabello, Venezuela. She was later refloated and repaired. |
| Jim Crow | United Kingdom | The ship ran aground on Taylor's Bank, in Liverpool Bay. She was on a voyage from Liverpool, Lancashire to Rotterdam, South Holland, Netherlands. Jim Crow was refloated on 16 July and put back to Liverpool. |
| T. S. Reeves | United Kingdom | The ship ran aground on the Kentish Knock. She was on a voyage from Cork to London. T. S. Reeves was refloated on 7 July. |
