= Eddystone (Tasmania) =

Island in Tasmania, Australia

Native name: no known native connection
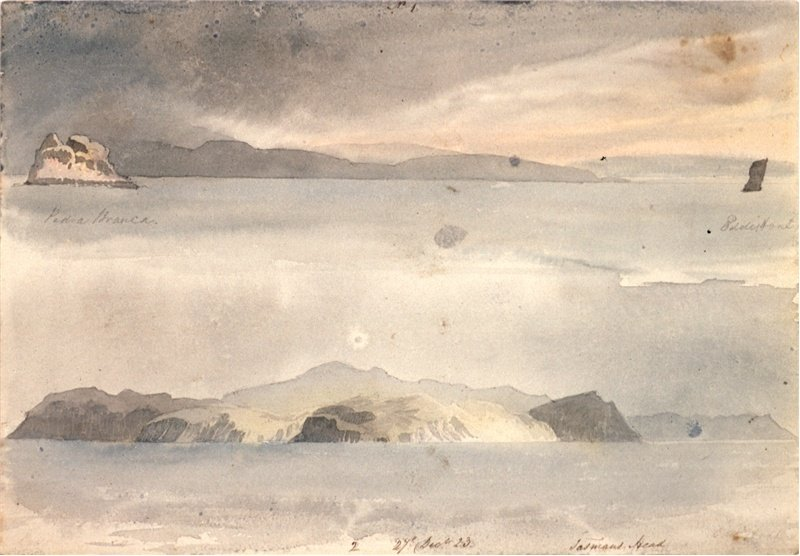
- Pedra Branca and Eddistone; Tasmans Head

- Location within Tasmania
- Etymology: Eddystone Lighthouse in Devon, England.

Geography
- Location: Southern Ocean
- Coordinates: 43°51′18″S 147°00′00″E
- Highest elevation: 30 m (100 ft)

Administration
- Australia
- State: Tasmania
- Region: Southern

Demographics
- Population: 0

Eddystone is a tower-shaped rock or small island, located in the Southern Ocean, off the southern coast of Tasmania, Australia. The island is situated approximately 27 km (17 mi) from the South East Cape on a bearing of 149° and is contained within the Southwest National Park, part of the Tasmanian Wilderness World Heritage Site. An erosional remnant of the Tasmanian mainland with an elevation of 30 m (98 ft) above sea level, the island is estimated to have separated from the Tasmanian mainland at least 15,000 years ago.

== Features and location ==
Eddystone is known for its inaccessibility and distinctive shape, described by Abel Tasman in 1642 as "a tall, obtuse, square tower". A painting from 1823 bears this out, and also shows its proximity to Pedra Branca, 2.2 km (1.4 mi) to the west.

Approximately 50 m (160 ft) off Eddystone there is a recently publicised surf break named Eddystone Rock. Surfers were shown the location by local fishermen, who have known about the break for many years.

The island has negligible plant life. Seabirds recorded as nesting there include Australasian gannets, black-faced cormorants and fairy prions. Australian and New Zealand fur seals haul-out on the lower ledges when seas are not too rough.

=== Important Bird Area ===
Together with the nearby Pedra Branca and Sidmouth Rock the island constitutes the 2 ha (4.9-acre) Pedra Branca Important Bird Area (IBA), identified as such by BirdLife International because it supports over 1% of the world populations of shy albatrosses and Australasian gannets.

== Etymology ==
Eddystone was named by Captain James Cook in 1777 because of its resemblance to Eddystone Lighthouse in Devon, England.

== See also ==
- List of islands of Tasmania
