= Low Islets =

Low Islets may refer to:

- Low Islets (Prime Seal Group), Tasmania
- Low Islets (Tasmania)
