= Motutakapu =

Coordinates: 36°41′04″S 175°22′27″E

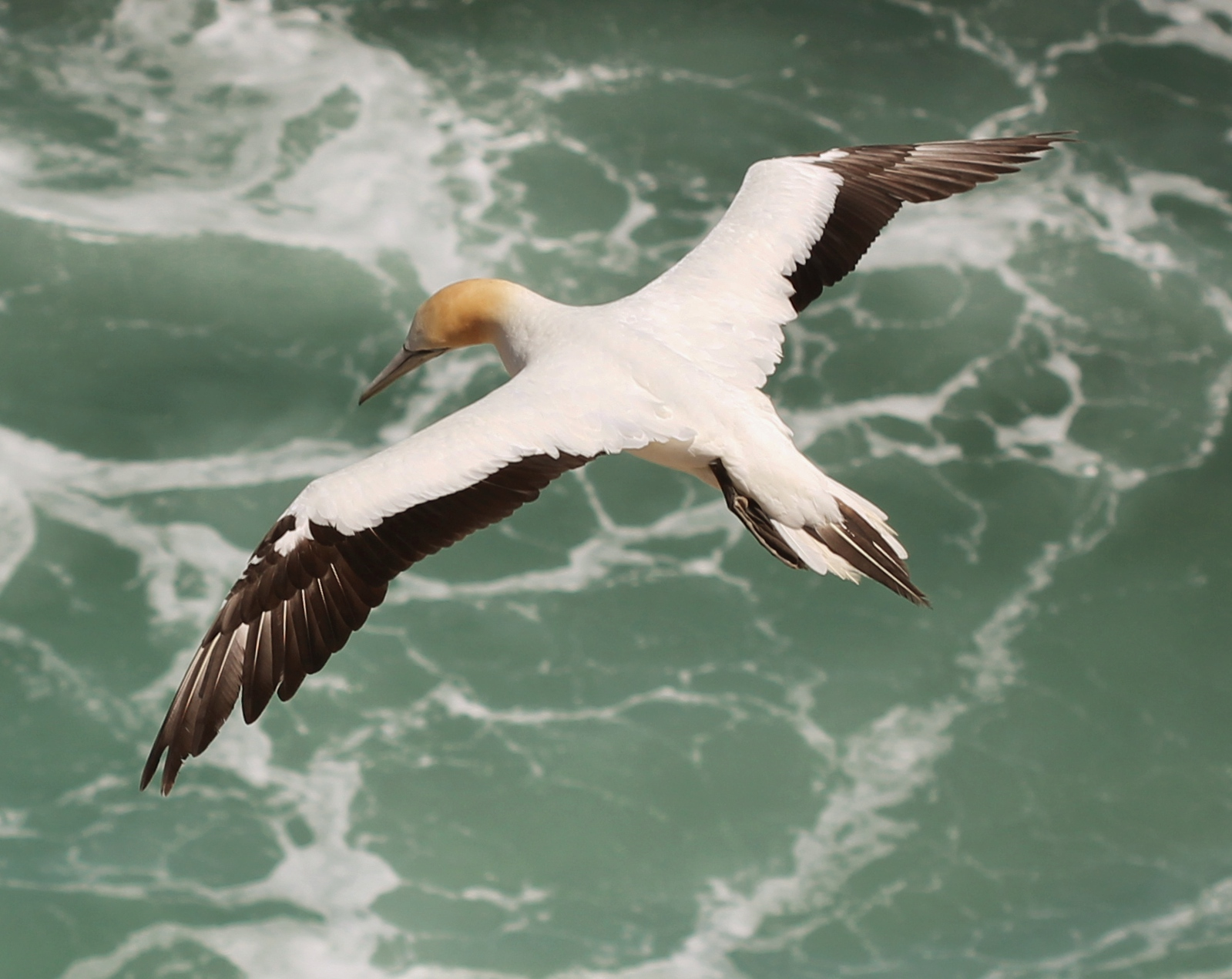
Australasian gannet

Motutakapu is a rugged islet in the Hauraki Gulf of New Zealand, lying some 5 km off the west coast of the Coromandel Peninsula. Only 120 m long by 60 m wide, it is home to a breeding colony of Australasian gannets and has been identified as an Important Bird Area by BirdLife International. Surveys of breeding gannets there in the mid-20th century showed an increase from about 200 pairs in 1928 to 400 pairs in 1947, while the BirdLife assessment was based on 1980-1981 surveys showing about 4500 pairs.

== See also ==
- Desert island
- List of islands
