= Three Sisters Island (Tasmania) =

Three small islands in Bass Strait, Tasmania

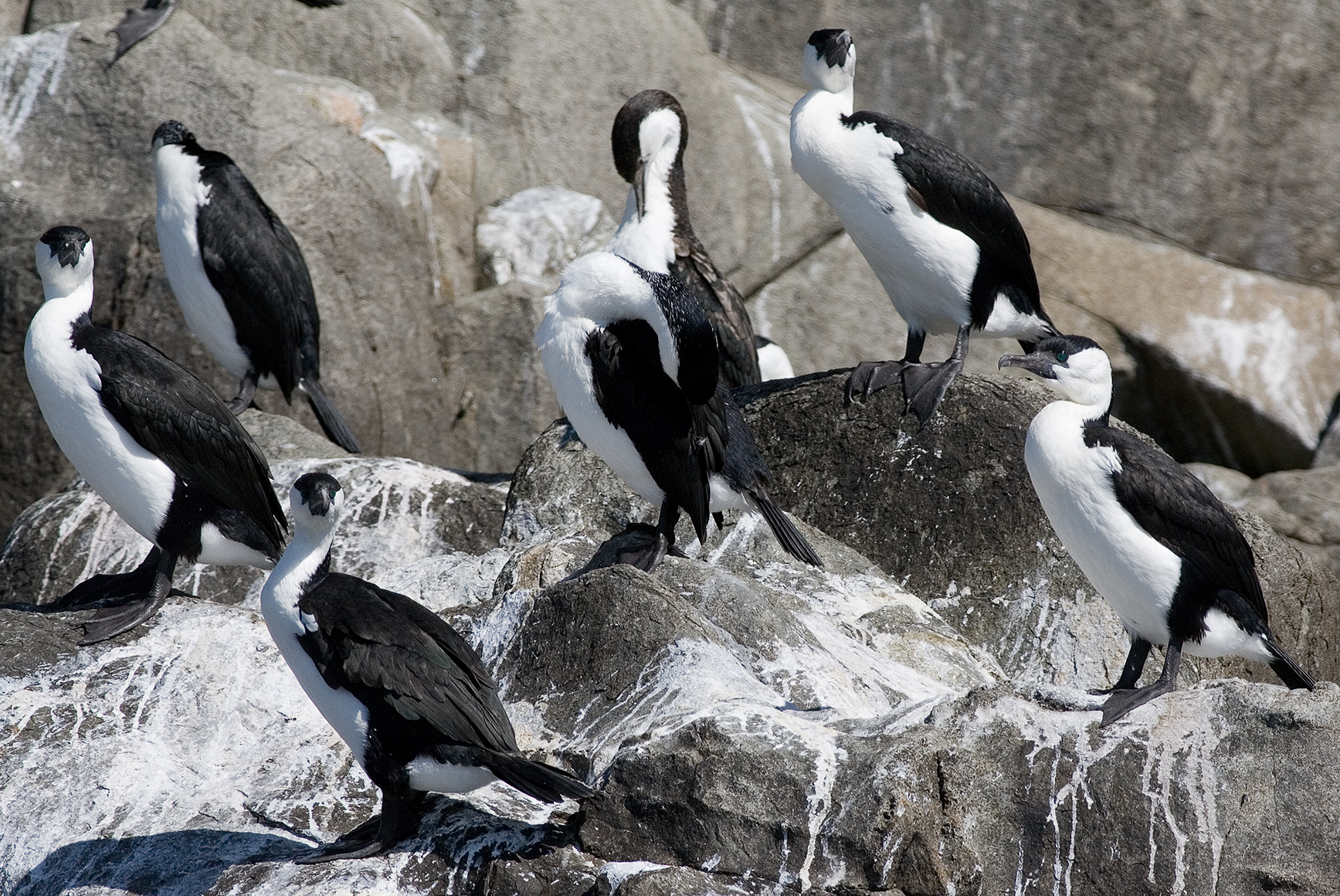
- The island is an important site for black-faced cormorants.

- Location within Tasmania

Geography
- Location: Bass Strait
- Coordinates: 41°07′21″S 146°07′41″E
- Area: 2 ha (4.9 acres)

Administration
- Australia
- State: Tasmania

Demographics
- Population: unpopulated

The Three Sisters Island or Three Sisters Islands are three small and rocky granite islands, with a collective land area of 2 hectares (4.9 acres), located in the Bass Strait, lying 500 metres (1,600 ft) off the north coast of Tasmania, Australia, between the towns of Penguin and Ulverstone.

The islands are steep-sided. Their vegetation of sparse coastal scrub is largely limited to their summits. Because landings are difficult owing to the lack of beaches and safe anchoring points they are little affected by human visitation and disturbance, although Australian fur seals haul-out on the lowest of them. Along with the neighbouring Goat Island, they are part of the 37-hectare (91-acre) Three Sisters – Goat Island Nature Reserve.

== Birds ==
The island group has been identified as an Important Bird Area (IBA) by BirdLife International because, with up to 400 breeding pairs, it supports over 1% of the world population of black-faced cormorants. Pacific gulls and sooty oystercatchers breed there every year in small numbers, and Caspian terns have nested there. White-bellied sea-eagles forage around the islands.

== See also ==
- List of islands of Tasmania
