= Lachlan Island =

Island in Tasmania, Australia

- Location within Tasmania

Geography
- Location: East Coast Tasmania
- Coordinates: 42°38′24″S 147°58′12″E
- Archipelago: Maria Island Group
- Adjacent to: Mercury Passage
- Area: 2.5 ha (6.2 acres)

Administration
- Australia
- State: Tasmania

Additional information
- Time zone: AEST (UTC+10)
  - Summer (DST): AEDT (UTC+11)

The Lachlan Island, part of the Maria Island Group, is an island with an area of about 2.5 hectares (6 acres) lying close to the south-eastern coast of Tasmania, Australia. The island is located near the Freycinet Peninsula, situated midway between Maria Island and the Tasmanian mainland.

== Fauna ==
Recorded breeding seabird and wader species are little penguin, short-tailed shearwater, kelp gull, sooty oystercatcher and Caspian tern. Rabbits were introduced in the early 20th century and were eventually eradicated in the 1990s.

== See also ==
- List of islands of Tasmania
- Tasmania's offshore islands
