= Pedra Branca (Tasmania) =

Island in Australia

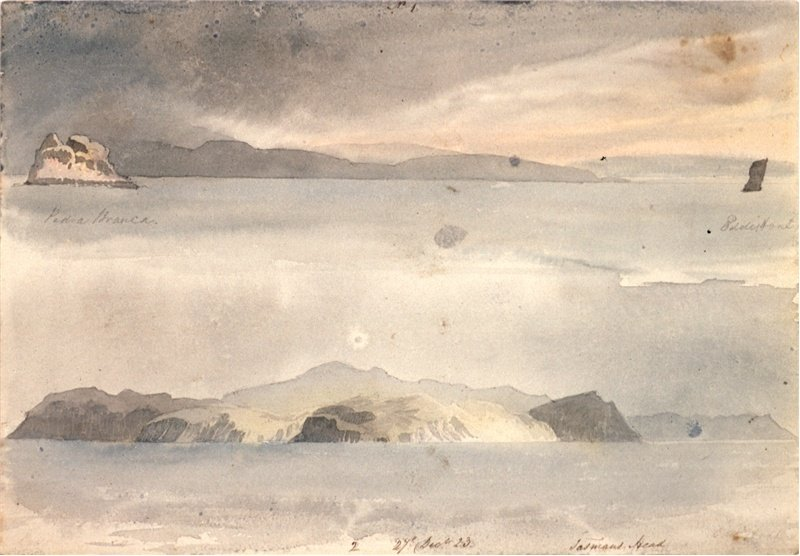
- An artist's impression of Pedra Branca and Eddystone, 1823.

- Location within Tasmania
- Etymology: Portuguese: "white rock"

Geography
- Location: Southern Ocean
- Coordinates: 43°51′00″S 146°58′12″E
- Area: 2.5 ha (6.2 acres)
- Length: 270 m (890 ft)
- Width: 100 m (300 ft)
- Highest elevation: 60 m (200 ft)

Administration
- Australia
- State: Tasmania
- Region: Southern

Demographics
- Population: 0

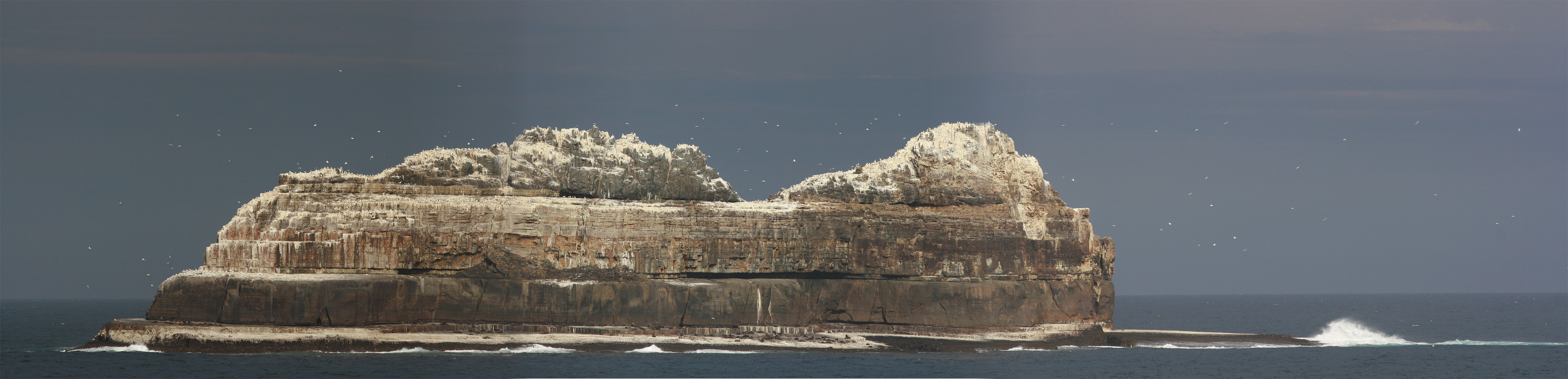
Pedra Branca, Tasmania

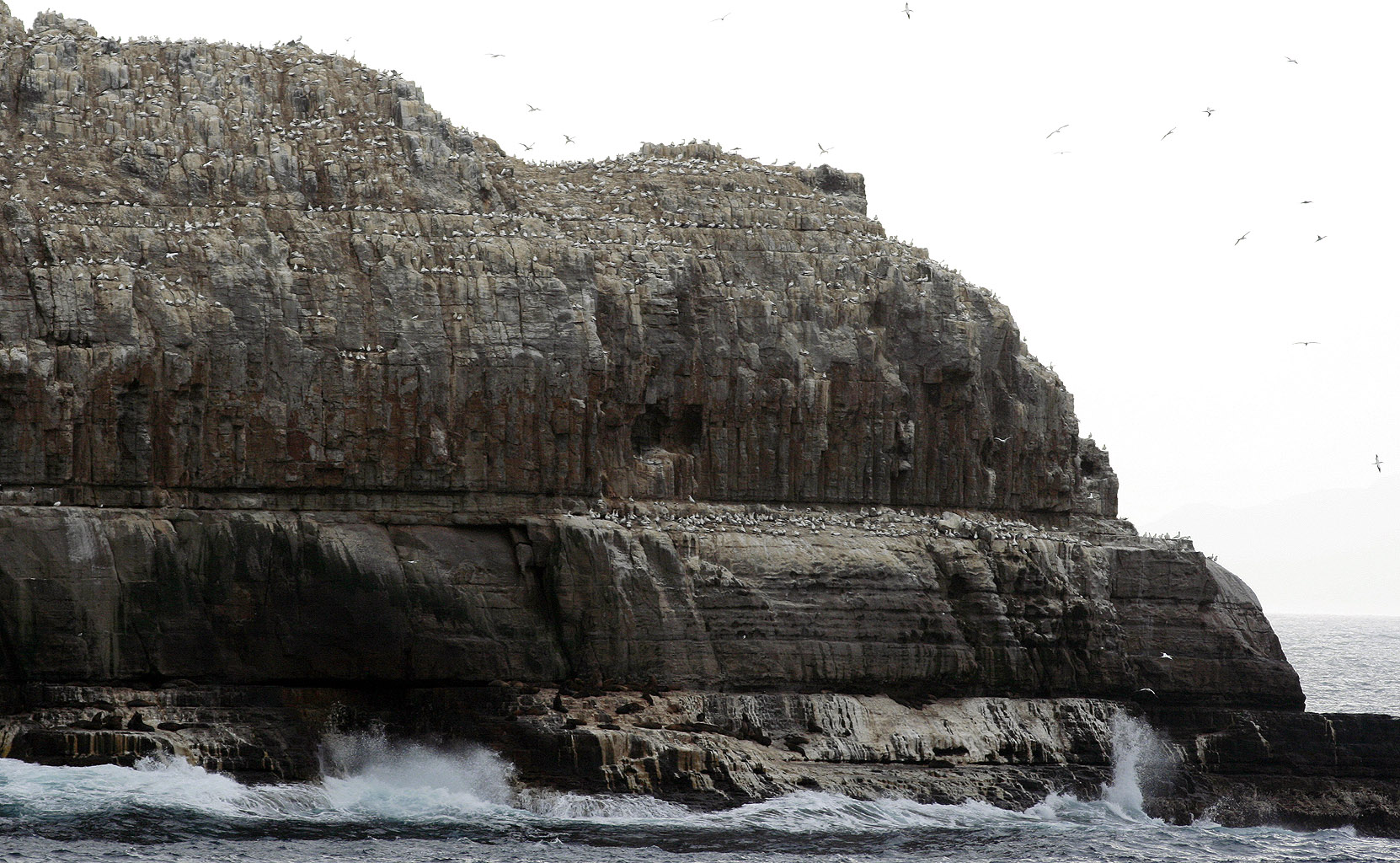
Gannets at Pedra Branca, Tasmania

Pedra Branca is a rock islet in the Southern Ocean, off the southern coast of Tasmania, Australia. The island is situated approximately 26 km (16 mi) south southeast of South East Cape and is contained within the Southwest National Park, part of the Tasmanian Wilderness World Heritage Site. An erosional remnant of the Tasmanian mainland, the island is approximately 270 m (890 ft) long, 100 m (330 ft) wide, with an elevation of 60 m (200 ft) above sea level. The island is estimated to have separated from the Tasmanian mainland at least 15,000 years ago.

== Features and location ==
Pedra Branca experiences wet and windy weather, and large waves. With an area of 2.5 ha (6.2 acres), the island is small enough to provide an example of an outcrop that lies on the border between being a rock or islet and an island. The geology features three breccia cones of dolerite and sandstone.

=== Flora and fauna ===
The only plant species found on the island is the succulent Sarcocornia quinqueflora. Recorded breeding seabird species include fairy prion, Pacific gull, silver gull, kelp gull, black-faced cormorant, Australasian gannet, and shy albatross. Australian fur seals use the island as a regular haul-out site while New Zealand fur seals visit occasionally.

The island is the only known habitat of a species of lizard, the Pedra Branca skink. An estimated 400 individuals survive, but the species is listed as vulnerable.

==== Important Bird Area ====
Together with the nearby Eddystone and Sidmouth Rock the island constitutes the 2 ha (5-acre) Pedra Branca Important Bird Area (IBA), identified as such by BirdLife International because it supports over 1% of the world populations of shy albatrosses and Australasian gannets.

== History ==
Abel Tasman led the first known European expedition to sight Tasmania. His journal entry for 29 November 1642 records that he observed a rock which was similar to a rock named Pedra Branca off China, presumably referring to the Pedra Branca in the South China Sea. The journal places Pedra Branca "about four [Dutch] miles" from the mainland of Tasmania; a Dutch mile from this period was about 5.8 km (3 5/8 mi), thus 4 such Dutch miles would be 23 km (14 mi), which is close to the actual distance of Pedra Branca from South East Cape.

Pedra Branca means "white rock" in Portuguese.

=== Shipwreck ===
On 7 February 1973 Nisshin Maru No. 8, a Japanese steel fishing vessel of 258 t (254 long tons) led by Captain Nakayama, on its way to Hobart for a mechanical inspection, hit Pedra Branca and within a few minutes sank in deep water. In the ensuing confusion only one of the crew of 22, engineer Yoshiichi Meguro, managed to clamber onto the rocks and escape drowning. The fishing vessel Walrus rescued the survivor.

The Nisshin Maru No. 8 disaster led to considerable improvements in communications between the various authorities that should have been able to mount a rescue operation many hours before this one was commenced. These included direct links between Japanese fishing boats and Australian shore stations, and correcting the inability of fishing vessels to directly contact warships and military aircraft, as they were unable to contact the Hobart emergency radio station which did not operate at night.

== Weather ==
Weather conditions in the area can be extreme, and Pedra Branca is occasionally swept by freak waves. On 15 April 2003, oceanographer Hamish Saunders drowned after being washed off Pedra Branca. The Tasmanian coroner's report includes testimony from three witnesses who described how Saunders was swept away when a "wave hit the island resulting in heavy spray coming up to and over the 45 m (148 ft) level". Waves were measured that day at up to 13.8 m (45 ft) by the Cape Sorell Waverider Buoy, some 100 km (62 mi) away.

== Etymology ==
Pedra Branca is Portuguese for "white rock". According to historian Kenneth McIntyre, Pedra Branca is one of only two Australian places with a name of Portuguese origin, the other being the Houtman Abrolhos islands in Western Australia.

== Surfing ==
Pedra Branca is home to a big wave surf break at a reef approximately 40 km (25 mi) offshore. Marti Paradisis was the first person to surf it. Later, in 2008, Ross Clarke-Jones and Tom Carroll joined local surfer Marti Paradisis and brothers James and Tyler Hollmer-Cross to shoot a story about it which was featured on 60 Minutes.

== See also ==
- List of islands of Tasmania
