= Wybalenna =

Wybalenna may refer to:

- Wybalenna Aboriginal Establishment on Flinders Island, off the north eastern tip of Tasmania
- Wybalenna Island, four small islands off the west coast of Flinders Island
