= Sidmouth Rock =

Island in Tasmania, Australia

- Location within Tasmania

Geography
- Location: Southern Ocean
- Coordinates: 43°50′24″S 147°01′12″E

Administration
- Australia
- State: Tasmania
- Region: Southern

Demographics
- Population: 0

The Sidmouth Rock is a rock islet or small island, located in the Southern Ocean, off the southern coast of Tasmania, Australia. The island is situated approximately 28 kilometres (17 mi) south-east of South East Cape and is contained within the Southwest National Park, part of the Tasmanian Wilderness World Heritage Site. An erosional remnant of the Tasmanian mainland with a diameter of 90 metres (300 ft), the island is estimated to have separated from the Tasmanian mainland at least 15,000 years ago.

== Location and features ==
The Sidmouth Rock is located approximately 2 kilometres (1.2 mi) east of Eddystone, another islet located off the South East Cape.

The islet is frequently wave-washed and supports no land-dwelling life.

=== Important Bird Area ===
Together with the nearby Eddystone and Pedra Branca islets, Sidmouth Rock constitutes the 2-hectare (4.9-acre) Pedra Branca Important Bird Area, identified as such by BirdLife International because it supports over 1% of the world populations of shy albatrosses and Australasian gannets.

== See also ==
- List of islands of Tasmania
