= Trumpeter Islets =

Two islets on coast of Tasmania, Australia

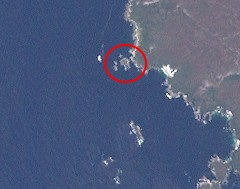
- A Landsat image of the Trumpeter Islets, circled in red.

- Location within Tasmania

Geography
- Location: South western Tasmania
- Coordinates: 43°16′48″S 145°48′00″E
- Archipelago: Trumpeter Islets Group
- Adjacent to: Southern Ocean
- Total islands: 2
- Area: 1 ha (2.5 acres)

Administration
- Australia
- State: Tasmania
- Region: South West

Demographics
- Population: Unpopulated

The Trumpeter Islets comprise a group of two unpopulated islets, with a combined area of about a hectare, located close to the south-western coast of Tasmania, Australia. Situated some 6 kilometres (3.7 mi) where the mouth of Port Davey meets the Southern Ocean, the 1-hectare (2.5-acre) island is part of the Trumpeter Islets Group, and comprises part of the Southwest National Park and the Tasmanian Wilderness World Heritage Site.

== Fauna ==
The islets are part of the Port Davey Islands Important Bird Area, so identified by BirdLife International because of its importance for breeding seabirds. Recorded breeding seabird and wader species are the little penguin (1000 pairs), short-tailed shearwater (1000 pairs), Pacific gull, silver gull, sooty oystercatcher, black-faced cormorant and Caspian tern. The Tasmanian tree skink is present.

== See also ==
- List of islands of Tasmania
