= Ile des Phoques =

Island in Tasmania, Australia

Coordinates: 42°24′S 148°09′E

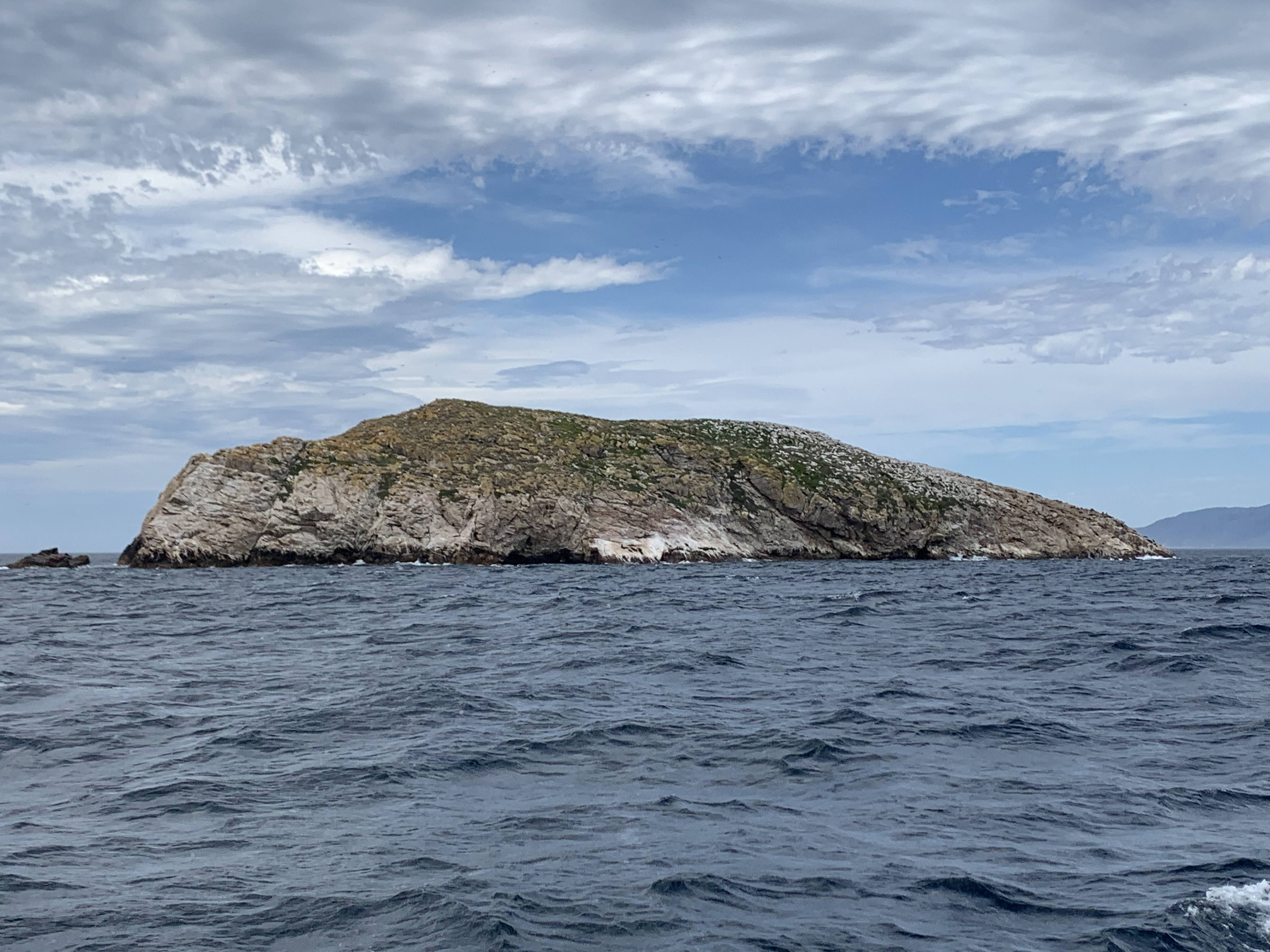
- As seen from the north in 2021

Geography
- Location: East coast of Tasmania
- Archipelago: Schouten Island Group
- Adjacent to: Tasman Sea
- Area: 8 ha (20 acres)

Administration
- Australia
- State: Tasmania
- Local government area: Glamorgan Spring Bay Council

Additional information
- Time zone: AEST (UTC+10)
  - Summer (DST): AEDT (UTC+11)

Ile des Phoques (also called Isle du Phoques) is a rugged granite island, with an area of 8 ha, part of the Schouten Island Group, lying close to the eastern coast of Tasmania, Australia near the Freycinet Peninsula.

Seal hunting took place here from at least 1805. Captain James Kelly is recorded sealing here during his 1816 circumnavigation of Tasmania.

It is a nature reserve.

== Fauna ==
Recorded breeding seabird species are little penguin, short-tailed shearwater, fairy prion and common diving-petrel. White-bellied sea-eagles have nested on the island. Australian fur seals haul-out there and there is historical evidence that it was once a major breeding colony.
