= South Pasco Island =

Island in Tasmania, Australia

Coordinates: 39°57′S 147°45′E

South Pasco Island is an island, with an area of 21 ha, in south-eastern Australia. It is part of Tasmania’s Pasco Island Group, lying in eastern Bass Strait off the north-west coast of Flinders Island in the Furneaux Group. It is used for grazing sheep.

== Fauna ==
Seabirds and waders recorded as breeding on the island include little penguin, short-tailed shearwater, white-faced storm-petrel, Pacific gull, Caspian tern and sooty oystercatcher. White's skink is present.

== See also ==
- List of islands of Tasmania
