= Inner Rocks =

Island in Tasmania, Australia

- Location within Tasmania

Geography
- Location: South western Tasmania
- Coordinates: 43°31′12″S 146°09′00″E
- Adjacent to: Southern Ocean
- Total islands: 3
- Area: 6.69 ha (16.5 acres)

Administration
- Australia
- State: Tasmania
- Region: South West

Demographics
- Population: Unpopulated

The Inner Rocks comprise a group of three steep rocky unpopulated islets located close to the south-western coast of Tasmania, Australia. Situated adjacent to the Southern Ocean, the 0.23-hectare (0.57-acre) islets are part of the Southwest National Park and the Tasmanian Wilderness World Heritage Site.

== Flora and fauna ==
The vegetation is dominated by ferns and the succulent plant pig face. Recorded breeding seabird species are the fairy prion (102 pairs) and common diving-petrel (100 pairs). The metallic skink is present.

== See also ==
- List of islands of Tasmania
