= Wybalenna Island =

Island in Tasmania, Australia

Coordinates: 40°01′S 147°50′E

Wybalenna Island comprises four round granite islands with a combined area of about 16 ha, in south-eastern Australia. It is part of Tasmania’s Prime Seal Island Group, lying in eastern Bass Strait west of Flinders in the Furneaux Group. The island is a conservation area.

== Fauna ==
Recorded breeding seabird and wader species are little penguin, short-tailed shearwater, white-faced storm-petrel, Pacific gull, silver gull, sooty oystercatcher and black-faced cormorant. The metallic skink is present.

== See also ==
- List of islands of Tasmania
