= Goat Island (Tasmania) =

Island in Tasmania, Australia

- Location within Tasmania

Geography
- Location: Bass Strait
- Coordinates: 41°07′48″S 146°07′48″E

Administration
- Australia
- State: Tasmania

Demographics
- Population: unpopulated

The Goat Island is a small and unpopulated granite island, located in the Bass Strait, lying off the north-west coast of Tasmania, Australia. The island is situated between Penguin and Ulverstone and can be walked to at low tide. It houses a breeding colony of little penguins.

Along with the nearby Three Sisters, the island is part of the 37-hectare (91-acre) Three Sisters – Goat Island Nature Reserve.

== See also ==
- List of islands of Tasmania
