= Tasmania's Offshore Islands =

Book about islands of Tasmania, Australia

Tasmania's offshore islands: seabirds and other natural features
- Author: Brothers, Nigel; Pemberton, David; Pryor, Helen; Lucieer, Vanessa
- Language: English
- Genre: Non-fiction; Natural history
- Published: Tasmanian Museum and Art Gallery
- Publication date: 2001
- Publication place: Australia
- Media type: Print
- Pages: xii, 643
- ISBN: 072464816X
- Dewey Decimal: 639.97842/09946; 598.177/09946
- Includes appendices.; Includes bibliographical references (p. 622-624) and indexes.

Tasmania's offshore islands: seabirds and other natural features is a book published by the Tasmanian Museum and Art Gallery in 2001. The book is considered an essential measure of the state of Tasmania's islands, birds inhabiting them, and the condition of the islands. The main author was Nigel Brothers, a Hobart based biologist, the other contributors were Vanessa Halley, Helen Pryor, and David Pemberton.

The Tasmanian archipelago is made up of 334 islands. This book highlights the uniqueness and importance of 280, as significant breeding refuges and wealthy natural resources. Islands are documented with descriptions of topography, wildlife, vegetation and full-colour photographs."

— Publisher's website.

== Coastal/Island groupings ==
Brothers, et al., choose to group the coastal regions and their associated islands in seven broad coastal regions:

- North west islands
- North coast islands
- North Bass Strait islands
- Furneaux islands
- North east islands
- East coast islands
- South and west coast islands
