= Low Islets (Prime Seal Group) =

Islands in Tasmania, Australia

Coordinates: 40°07′S 147°43′E

The Low Islets are two small, flat, adjacent, granite islands, with a combined area of about 2 ha, in south-eastern Australia. They are part of Tasmania’s Prime Seal Island Group, lying in eastern Bass Strait west of Flinders in the Furneaux Group. The larger of the two islets has been used for grazing sheep, cattle and horses.

== Fauna ==
Recorded breeding seabird and wader species are short-tailed shearwater, white-faced storm-petrel, sooty oystercatcher, Pacific gull, silver gull, Caspian tern, crested tern and black-faced cormorant. Reptiles include the white-lipped snake and metallic skink.

== See also ==
- List of islands of Tasmania
