= City of Edinburgh (1813 ship) =

Merchant ship built at Bengal

History

United Kingdom
- Name: City of Edinburgh
- Owner: J. Farquhar & Co.
- Builder: A. Woodcock, Coringa, Bengal
- Launched: 1 December 1813, or 1816
- Fate: Wrecked 1840

General characteristics
- Tons burthen: 360, or 366, or 367, or 37040/94, or 375, or 376 (bm)
- Length: 96 ft 9 in (29.5 m)
- Beam: 30 ft 8 in (9.3 m)
- Propulsion: Sail

City of Edinburgh was a merchant ship built at Bengal in 1813. She transferred to British registry and sailed between Britain and India. She made two voyages transporting convicts from Ireland to Australia. Later, she made a whaling voyage to New Zealand. She was wrecked in 1840.

== Career ==
City of Edinburgh first appeared in Lloyd's Register (LR) in 1815 with Lock, master, H. Agar, owner, and trade London–India. The British East India Company (EIC), in 1813 lost its monopoly on the trade between Britain and India. City of Edinburgh, Lock, master, made several voyages between England and Bengal, sailing under a license from the EIC.

The Register of Shipping volume for 1820 showed City of Edinburgh with W.Lock, master, changing to Wiseman, J. Farquhar, owner, and trade London–India. City of Edinburgh, Wiseman, master, arrived at Bengal on 4 June 1821 with eight feet of water in her hold. Her cargo had sustained much damage.

Year	Master	Owner	Trade	Source
1821	Wiseman	Bassett & Co.	London–Bengal	LR
1825	Wiseman	Bazett & Co.	Plymouth–Calcutta	LR; large repair in 1823
1828	G.Milne; Clendon	Mason & Co.	London–Calcutta	LR; large repair in 1823

On her first convict voyage, under the command of James R. Clendon and surgeon William Anderson, she departed Cork, Ireland on 23 June 1828 and arrived in Sydney on 12 November. She had embarked 80 female convicts and there were no convict deaths en route.

On her second convict voyage, under the command of Giles Wade and surgeon Anthony Donoghue, she departed Cork on 18 March 1832 and arrived in Sydney on 27 June 1832. She had initially embarked 145 male convicts but sailed with 139, and had no convict deaths en route. City of Edinburgh departed Port Jackson, bound for Hokianga, New Zealand on 1 August 1832.

Lloyd's Register for 1833 showed City of Edinburgh, of 367 tons (bm), with W. Baker, master. On 1 November 1833 she sailed for New Zealand and she was reported to be near there on 25 December 1837, with 150 tons of whale oil.

In 1837 her owners sold her in London as a "Free Trader". Lloyd's Register for 1838 showed her with Thompson, master, and W. Baker, owner, and trade London-Sydney.

== Fate ==
City of Edinburgh was wrecked at Prime Seal Island on 11 July 1840. Seeking refuge from a gale, Captain Fearon took shelter at the island but the tide drove her ashore. All on board took to three boats and were saved, but the ship herself broke up.
