= Ketchem Island =

Island in Tasmania, Australia

- Location within Tasmania

Geography
- Location: Southern Ocean
- Coordinates: 43°31′S 146°07′E
- Archipelago: Mutton Bird Islands Group
- Highest elevation: 3 m (10 ft)

Administration
- Australia
- State: Tasmania
- Region: South West

Demographics
- Population: unpopulated

Ketchem Island is a small island in south-eastern Australia. It is part of the Mutton Bird Island Group, lying close to the southern end of the south-western coast of Tasmania. It is also part of the Southwest National Park, and thus within the Tasmanian Wilderness World Heritage Site.

== Flora and fauna ==
The islet's vegetation is dominated by pigface, Melaleuca sp. and Stipa sp.
