= Prime Seal Island =

Island in Tasmania, Australia

Coordinates: 40°04′S 147°45′E

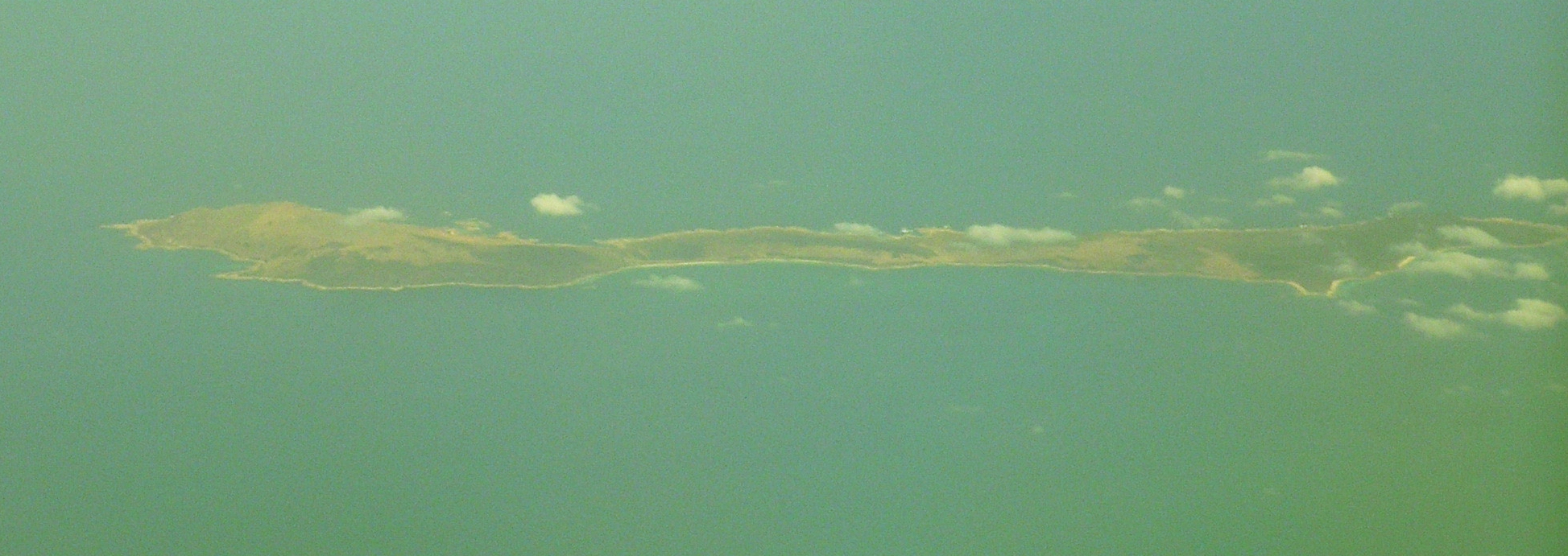
View from east

Prime Seal Island is a long island, with a high central ridge and an area of 1220 ha, in south-eastern Australia. It is part of Tasmania’s Prime Seal Island Group, lying in eastern Bass Strait west of Flinders in the Furneaux Group. Geologically, it is limestone overlying granite and has notable karst features, including caves. It is leased for farming and is extensively grazed by sheep and cattle as well as the native Tasmanian pademelons.

== Fauna ==
Large numbers of seals were reported here in 1827. Recorded breeding seabird and wader species are short-tailed shearwater and sooty oystercatcher. White-bellied sea-eagles have nested on the island. Reptiles include the tiger snake, metallic skink and three-lined skink. Cats, house mice and Indian peafowl have been introduced.

== History ==
The ship City of Edinburgh wrecked on the island on 11 July 1840.

== See also ==
- List of islands of Tasmania
