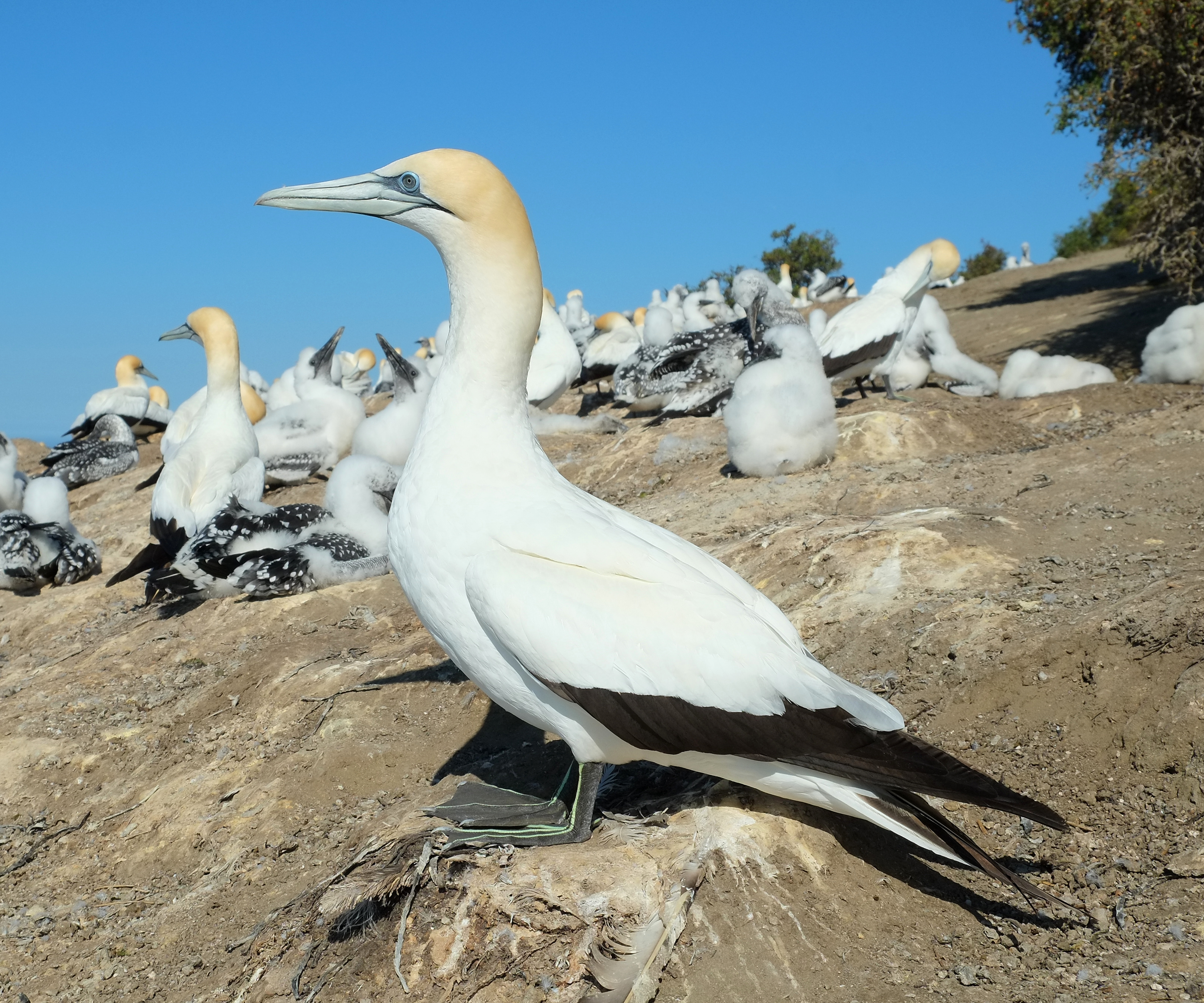
- Vocalizations at a colony on Cape Kidnappers, New Zealand

Conservation status
- Least Concern (IUCN 3.1)

Scientific classification
- Kingdom: Animalia
- Phylum: Chordata
- Class: Aves
- Order: Suliformes
- Family: Sulidae
- Genus: Morus
- Species: M. serrator

Binomial name
- Morus serrator (Gray, GR, 1843)
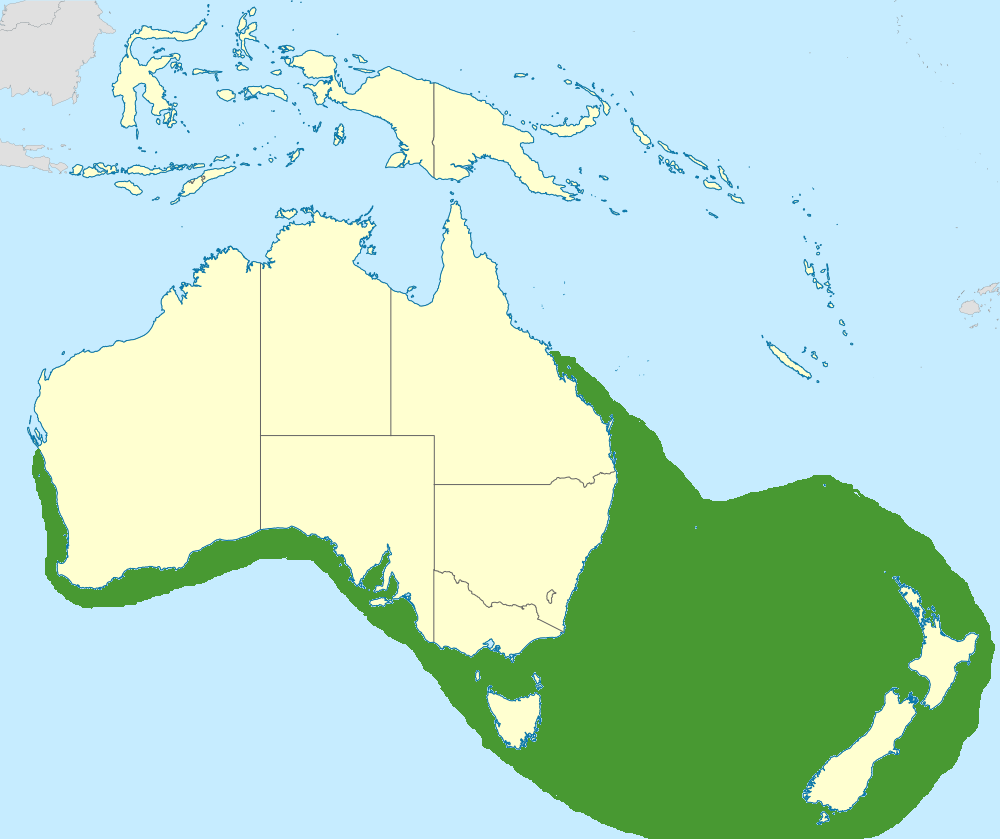
- Australasian gannet range

Synonyms
- Sula australis Gould, 1841; Sula serrator Gray, 1843

= Australasian gannet =

Species of seabird

The Australasian gannet (Morus serrator), also known as the Australian gannet or tākapu, is a large seabird of the booby and gannet family, Sulidae. Adults are mostly white, with black flight feathers at the wingtips and lining the trailing edge of the wing. The central tail feathers are also black. The head is tinged buff-yellow, with a pearly grey bill edged in dark grey or black, and blue-rimmed eyes. Young birds have mottled plumage in their first year, dark above and light below. The head is an intermediate mottled grey, with a dark bill. The birds gradually acquire more white in subsequent seasons until they reach maturity after five years.

The species range over water above the continental shelf along the southern and eastern Australian coastline, from Steep Point in Western Australia to Rockhampton, Queensland, as well as the North and South Islands of New Zealand, Lord Howe and Norfolk Islands. Nesting takes place in colonies along the coastlines of New Zealand, Victoria and Tasmania—mostly on offshore islands, although there are several mainland colonies in both countries. Highly territorial when breeding, the Australasian gannet performs agonistic displays to defend its nest. Potential and mated pairs engage in courtship and greeting displays. The nest is a cup-shaped mound composed of seaweed, earth, and other debris, built by the female from material mainly gathered by the male. A single pale blue egg is laid yearly, though lost eggs may be replaced. The chick is born featherless but is soon covered in white down. Fed regurgitated fish by its parents, it grows rapidly and outweighs the average adult when it fledges.

These birds are plunge divers and spectacular fishers, plunging into the ocean at high speed. They eat mainly squid and forage fish that school near the surface. The species faces few natural or man-made threats, and since its population is growing it is considered to be a least-concern species by the International Union for Conservation of Nature (IUCN).

== Taxonomy ==
Sir Joseph Banks shot three Australasian gannets in New Zealand waters on 24 December 1769 off Three Kings Islands. The birds were cooked in a goose pie, which was enjoyed by the sailors, for Christmas the next day. Daniel Solander wrote a formal description, noting its differences from the familiar northern gannet, initially giving it the name Pelecanus chrysocephalus before crossing it out and changing it to Pelecanus sectator. Sydney Parkinson illustrated the bird as P. sectator, which was misread as P. serrator by later authorities. The species name has been translated as "sawyer", from serra "saw", and linked to the serrated bill.

John Gould described specimens from the Derwent River and Actaeon Island in Tasmania as Sula australis in 1841. The binomial name Sula australis had already been used by J. F. Stephens for the red-footed booby. English zoologist George Robert Gray wrote of the species in 1843, initially using Gould's name but soon switching to Sula serrator, based on Parkinson's drawing. Although Gould stuck with S. australis, S. serrator became the preferred term over time.

"Australasian gannet" has been designated as the official common name for the species by the International Ornithologists' Union (IOC). It is also known as Pacific gannet and, in Australia, as Australian gannet, diver (from its plunge-diving), booby, or solan goose. In New Zealand it is also known by the Māori name tākapu or tākupu, a word of wider Polynesian origin for a gannet or booby.

The Sulidae, the gannets and boobies, appeared about 30 million years ago. Early Sulidae fossils most resembled the boobies, although they were more aquatic, the gannets splitting off later, about 16 million years ago. The gannets evolved in the northern hemisphere, later colonising the southern oceans. The most ancient extant species may be the Abbott's booby, possibly the sole survivor of an otherwise extinct separate lineage. A 2011 genetic study of nuclear and mitochondrial DNA suggests that the ancestor of the gannets arose around 2.5 million years ago before splitting into northern and southern lineages. The latter then split into the Cape and Australasian gannets around 0.5 million years ago. The three gannets are generally considered to be separate species forming a superspecies, though they have also formerly been classified as subspecies of the northern gannet (Sula bassanus).

== Description ==
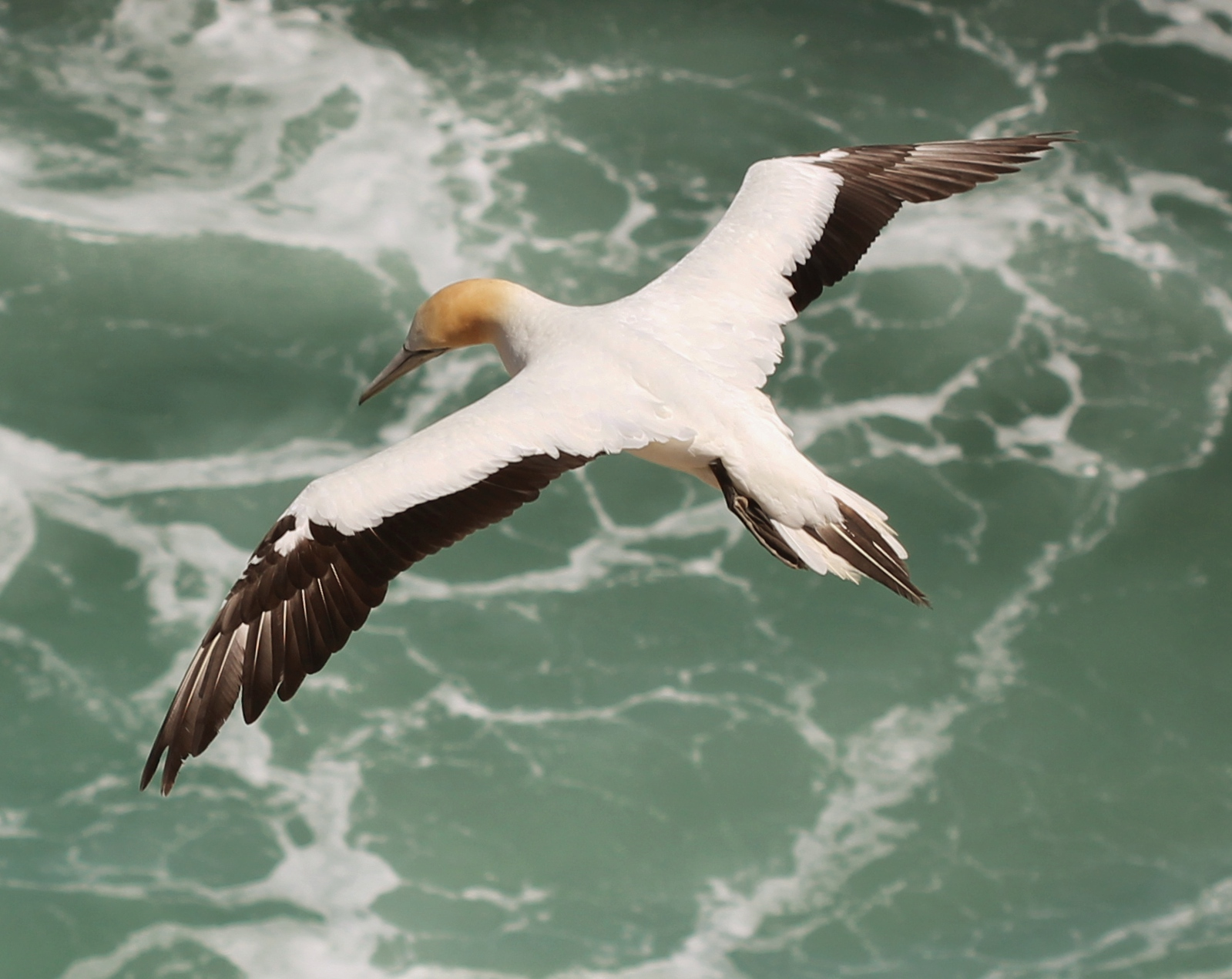
Adult in flight, showing black markings on wings and tail

An adult Australasian gannet is 84–91 cm (33–36 in) long, weighs 2.3 kg (5.1 lb), and has a 170–200 cm (67–79 in) wingspan. The two sexes are generally of a similar size and appearance, though a 2015 field study at Pope's Eye and Point Danger colonies found females to be 3.1% and 7.3% heavier respectively. Females also had a slightly larger ulna and smaller bill. The plumage is white with black flight feathers on the wings, and central rectrices of the tail. Some individuals have more extensive black plumage of their tail feathers. There is a sharp demarcation between light and dark plumage. Black primary feathers are more resilient to wear, which may explain the dark plumage of the wings. The head and hindneck are tinged buff-yellow. The colour is more pronounced on the head and during breeding season. The eyes have a light grey iris surrounded by a pale blue eye ring, and bare black skin on the face which merges into the bill. In adults, the bill is pearly grey with dark grey or black edges, and a black groove running down the length of the upper mandible. The four-toed feet are dark grey and joined by a membrane of similar colour. There are light green lines running along the ridges of the toes that continue along up the front of the legs.

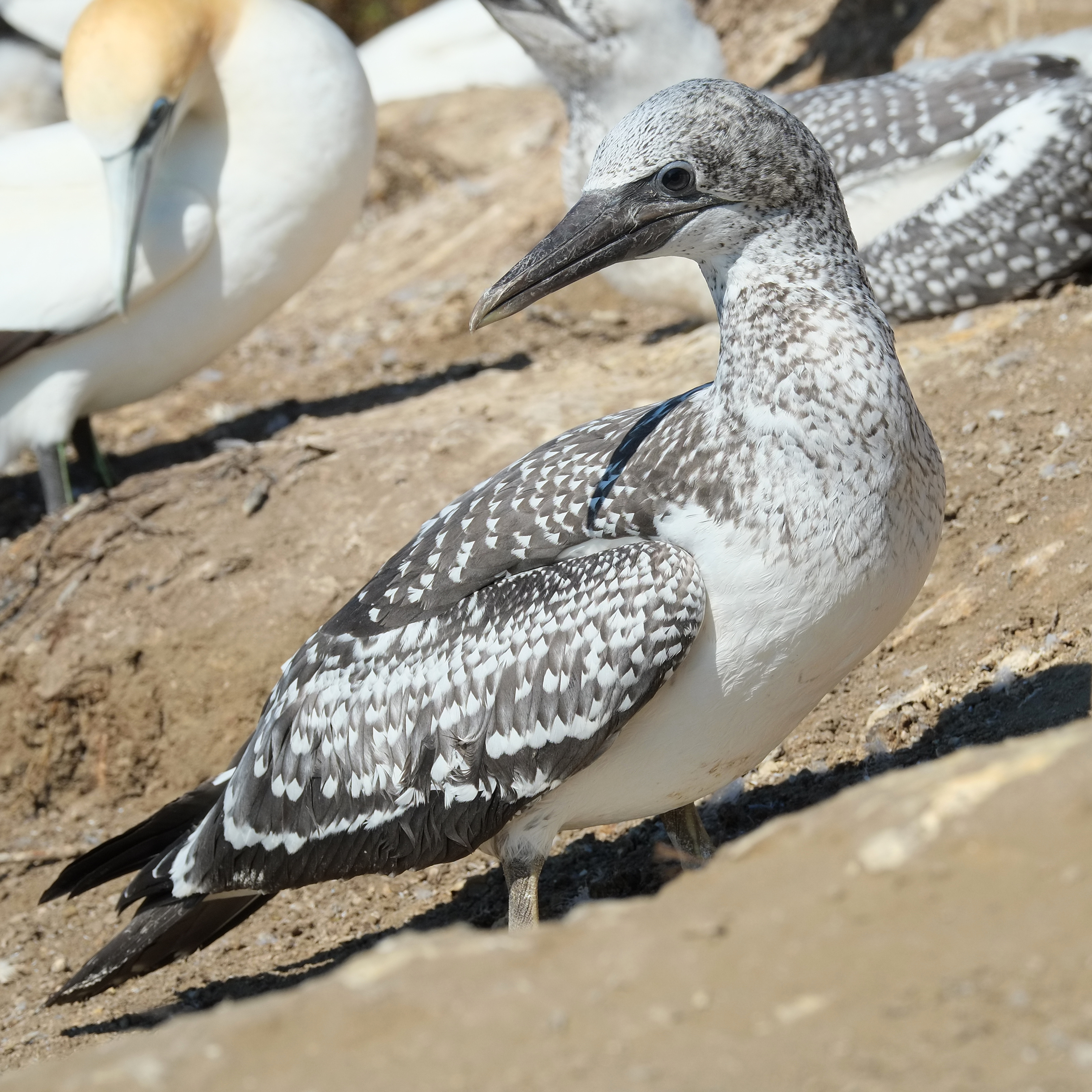
Juveniles have spotted brown plumage.

Fledglings are brownish-grey speckled with white overall. They have dark brown bills, bare facial skin and eyes, and dark grey legs and feet. Australasian gannets take 2–5 years to gain adult plumage. Over this period, the upperparts and underparts gradually whiten and the crown and nape become buff-coloured, but there is great variation in the age that mature plumage is seen.

This species is distinctive and only likely to be confused with species that do not generally share its range. The Cape gannet is a rare vagrant to Australasian waters and has an all-black tail, while the masked and red-footed boobies are generally restricted to tropical waters. Although both have mostly white plumage, they lack the buff colouring of the head and have white tails. The masked booby has a blue-black face and less black on the wing, while the red-footed booby has red feet.

=== Call ===
The Australasian gannet is generally silent at sea and loud and vocal at the colony in the day and at times overnight during the breeding season. Its typical call is a harsh arrah-arrah or urrah-urrah, which is emitted upon approaching or arriving at the colony or as a threat. The calls can vary between individuals, and the female's call is lower pitched than the male's.

== Distribution and habitat ==
The Australasian gannet is found from Steep Point in Western Australia, along the southern and eastern Australian coastline to the vicinity of Rockhampton in Queensland, as well as the North and South Islands of New Zealand, Lord Howe and Norfolk Islands. At sea, it is generally restricted to waters over the continental shelf, and may enter harbours, bays and estuaries, particularly in stormy weather. Over May and June, young gannets from New Zealand colonies disperse to the north and west, mainly flying north around the North Island and (to a lesser extent) via the Cook Strait. They generally reach as far as southeastern Queensland and Rottnest Island in Western Australia. Far-wandering gannets are occasional visitors to Marion Island and the Crozet Islands in the southern Indian Ocean, and have even reached South Africa where they have interbred with Cape gannets. Some immature gannets spend 3 to 4 years in Australian waters before returning to New Zealand, while others remain in New Zealand waters.

=== Breeding colonies ===
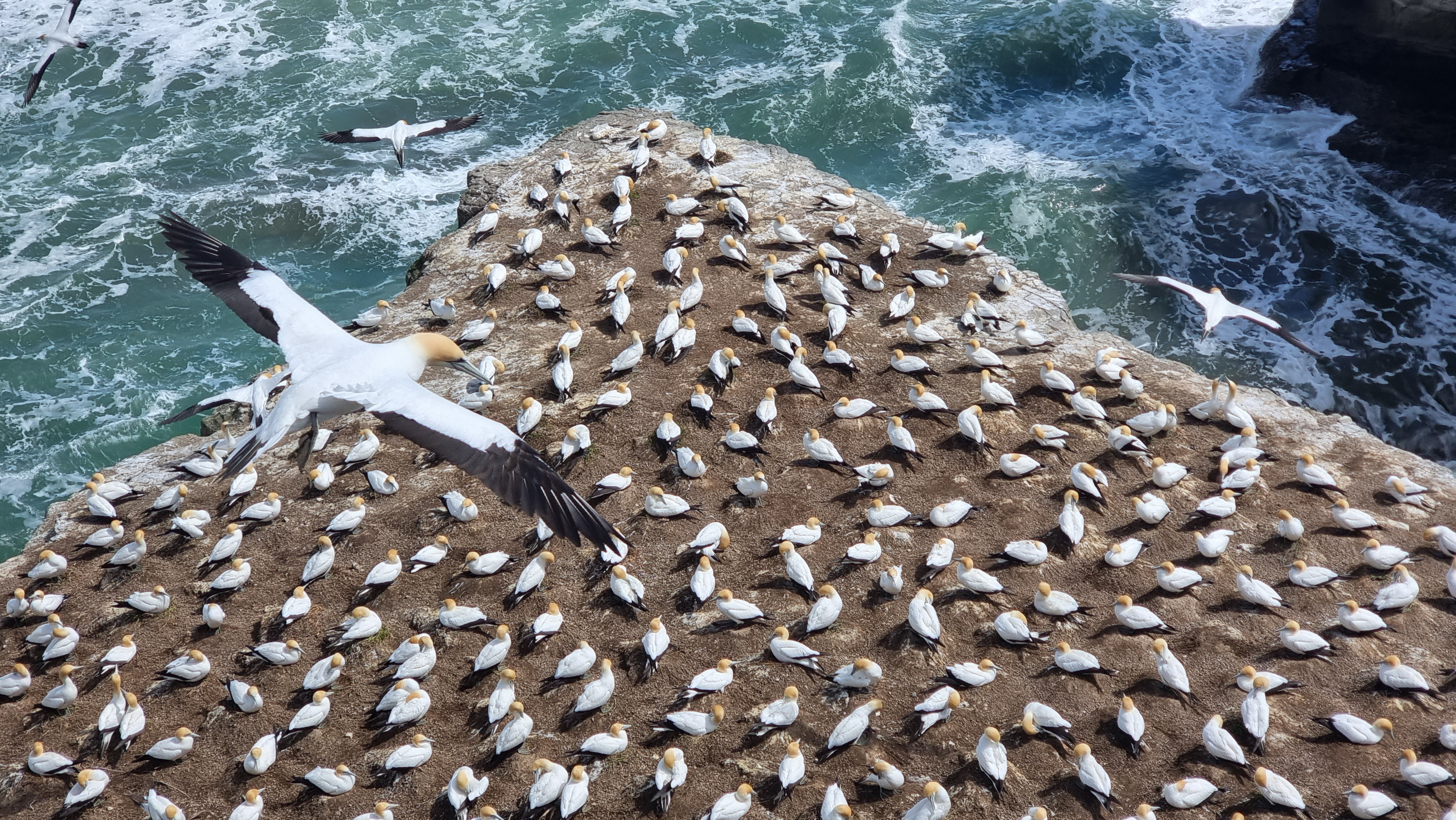
Breeding colony at Muriwai, New Zealand

Breeding colonies are mostly on offshore islands, though several mainland colonies exist in Australia and New Zealand. Numbers of Australasian gannet have been increasing since 1950, although some colonies have disappeared and others have decreased in size. Between 1980 and 2000, the population in Australian waters increased from approximately 6,600 to 20,000 breeding pairs. The most recent comprehensive New Zealand census was in 1981, yielding an estimate of 46,600 pairs, estimated to have increased to around 55,000 pairs in 2006. Colony location is related to sea temperature, which in turn dictates the presence of fish. Many colonies have limited space and birds seek new locations once the nest sites in a colony are full, at this point often spilling over onto the mainland.

In Victoria, there are colonies at Lawrence Rocks near Portland, and Pope's Eye and Wedge Light in Port Phillip near Melbourne. The colony on Lawrence Rocks increased from 200 pairs in 1873 to around 3,100 pairs in 1996–97, by which time all available space on the island had been filled. Gannets began roosting at Point Danger—the closest point on the mainland itself—in 1995, and began nesting the following year after a fox-proof fence was erected around the site. The only nesting locale on mainland Australia itself, the Point Danger colony, has increased steadily, reaching 660 pairs in 1999–2000. Located 5 kilometres (3.1 mi) northeast of Portsea, Pope's Eye is a low artificial semicircular stone breakwater. Gannets began breeding on manmade structures in Port Phillip in 1966, with three pairs at Wedge Light. By the 1999–2000 season, there were 507 pairs there, and on seven other artificial structures around the bay.

In Tasmania, there are colonies at Eddystone Rock and Pedra Branca off the south coast, and in Bass Strait at Cat Island off Flinders Island, and Black Pyramid Rock off the northwest coast. The colony on Black Pyramid grew from 500 pairs in 1961 to 12,300 pairs in 1998. Eddystone Rock increased from 20 pairs in 1947 to 189 pairs in 1998, and Pedra Branca grew from 1000 pairs in 1939 to 3,300 pairs by 1995, but both these sites have little or no room for expansion. Conversely, the colony at Cat Island fell from an estimated 5–10,000 pairs in 1908 to negligible numbers by the turn of the millennium due to predation.

In New Zealand, almost all breeding colonies are on or around the North Island. Kārewa / Gannet Island, 19 kilometres (12 mi) offshore from Kawhia, was named as 'Gannet Island' by Captain James Cook in January 1770 for the gannets seen there and 8,003 pairs were counted in a 1981 census. Manawatāwhi / Three Kings Islands, 55 kilometres (34 mi) north-west of Cape Reinga, contained New Zealand's largest offshore gannet colonies, with 9,855 pairs across five smaller colonies in 1981; an aerial survey in 2014–15 found that it had shrunk to 6,402 pairs. Whakaari / White Island, 48 kilometres (30 mi) offshore in the Bay of Plenty and comprising five smaller colonies, also saw a reduction in numbers, from 6,662 pairs in 1980–81 to 5,306 pairs in 2014–15. The colony at Cape Kidnappers in Hawke's Bay is thought to have been settled around 1850, with 100 pairs reported in 1885. It had 5,186 pairs counted in a 1981 census, and has steadily grown to over 6500 pairs, making it the largest and most accessible mainland colony in the world. Muriwai, near Auckland, comprises a mainland colony on Okatamiro Point, estimated at 1,385 pairs in 2016, while nearby Motutara (Pillar Rock) had 187 pairs. Gannets established a colony on Tikitiki Rock (Nine Pin Rock) in the outer Bay of Islands in 2007, which had around 70 pairs by 2017. A small colony was established at Young Nick's Head in 2008.

On the South Island, gannets began breeding at the end of Farewell Spit in 1983, in an area known as Shellbanks—a 2 m (7 ft) high area of shells and driftwood interspersed with low vegetation: marram (Ammophila arenaria), sea rocket (Cakile edentula), velvety nightshade (Solanum chenopodioides) and sowthistle (Sonchus oleraceus). Strong winds allow gannets to take off vertically most of the time, and the decline in commercial fishing in nearby Golden Bay and Tasman Bay is thought to have increased food supply. The breeding area is cut off from the mainland by high tides, but can be badly impacted by storms. It grew by around 11% per year, reaching an estimated 3,900 pairs in 2011.

Little Solander Island in Foveaux Strait hosts the southernmost gannet colony, around 20 pairs recorded on most visits between 1948 and 1986, with one count of 62 pairs in 1984 possibly anomalous.

== Behaviour ==
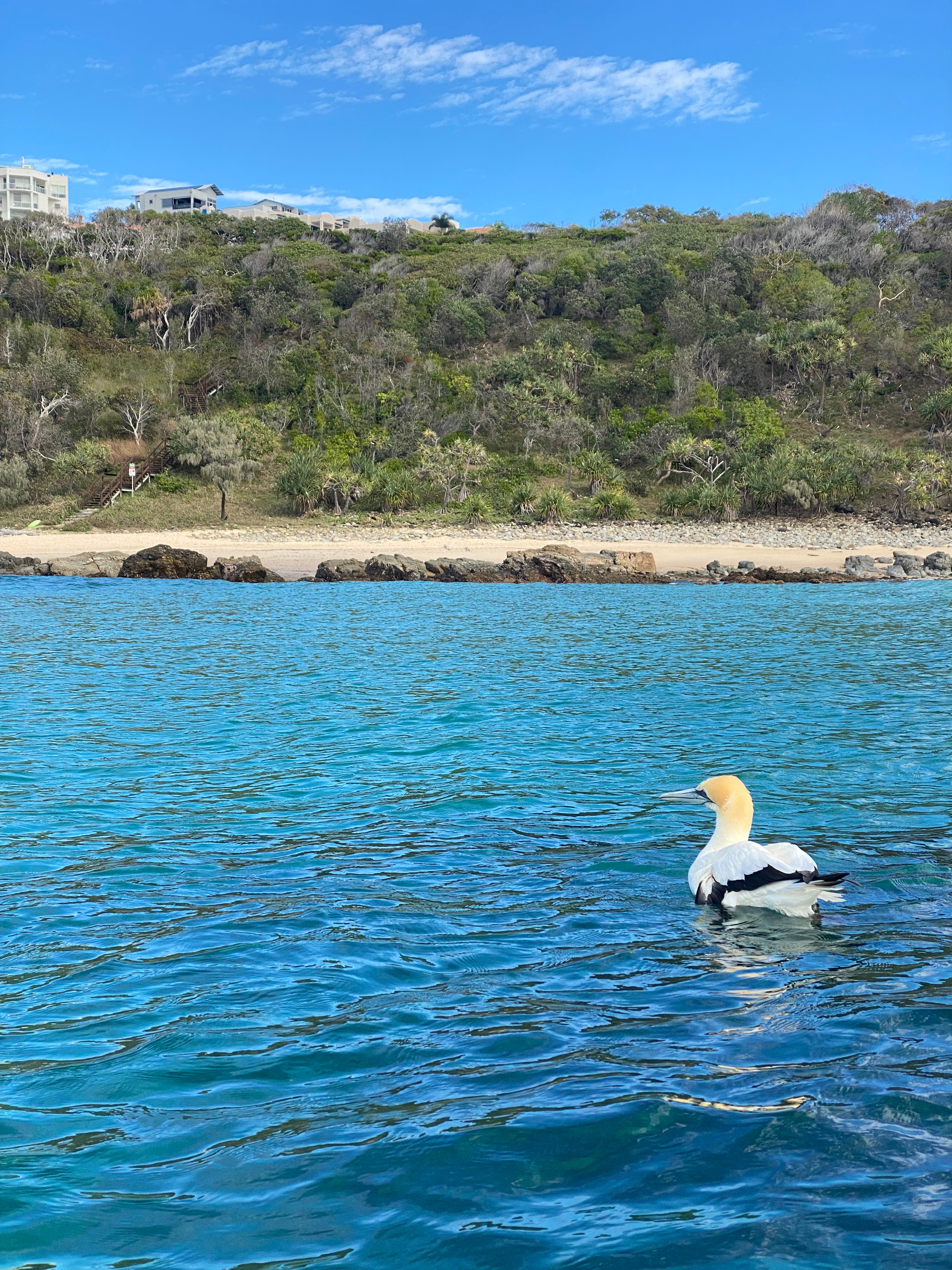
Sitting on the surface of the water

The Australasian gannet is generally solitary when out at sea, though once a bird has found fish to hunt, other gannets may notice and join it. It is gregarious on land, nesting in colonies. Non-breeding gannets often form groups on the outskirts of the colony. Small numbers of gannets may remain around the colony site outside of the breeding season, using it as a roosting site.

=== Breeding and courtship ===
Courtship behaviour

Gannet pairs form monogamous and long term bonds, and pairs may remain together over several seasons until one member dies, although they have been known to separate. The Australasian gannet is highly territorial when nesting, engaging in agonistic displays to mark their ground against neighbours and interlopers. In the bowing display, the male's head and beak point down, and its wings are held up and away from the body, yet folded backwards. He moves his head from side to side before bowing forwards. The male may escalate by lunging at an interloper, either with a closed or open bill, or proceed to locking bills and wrestling for an extended period. Fights can be fatal on occasion. A bird may engage in an appeasement display to calm an attacker by lowering its head and tucking its bill in its chest.

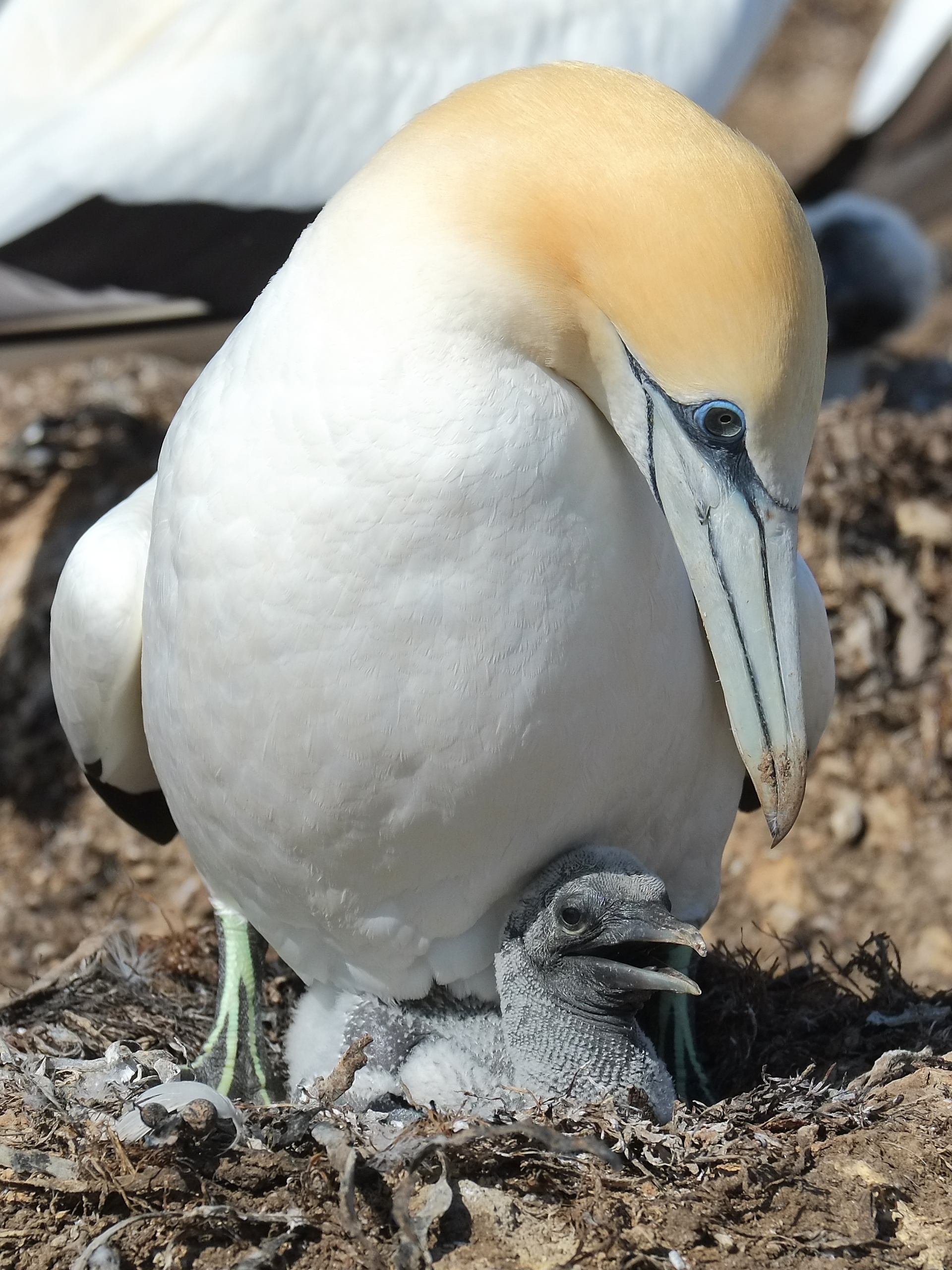
Adult and chick

Mated pairs engage in a fencing display when the male arrives back at the nest. The two birds stand breast to breast with wings spread and bills extended vertically. They fence and scissor with their bills rapidly, calling loudly at the same time. Fencing is interspersed with bill bowing. The birds generally follow this exchange with allopreening. Mated pairs also engage in sky-pointing, where a bird paces slowly with its neck and bill vertical and its wings partly raised. Copulation takes place after allopreening, the female shaking her head vigorously and the male biting her neck and climbing on her back and waving his wings before joining their cloacae. Afterwards the female preens the male, who slides off his partner and reciprocates preening.

The breeding season is generally from July to February, with marked differences between locations. On Motukaramarama Island, the gannets return in mid-June, laying eggs between 20 July and 7 August. The chicks hatch from 10 October to 2 November and fledge from late December. At Cape Kidnappers, the gannets return in late July, laying eggs from early September to the end of October. The chicks fledge from early February. At Pope's Eye, gannets lay eggs between early August and December, the median and mean being laid in September. Younger parents tend to lay eggs later in the year than older parents. Within colonies, there is a wider variation in breeding dates compared to the northern gannet, thought to be due to the absence of a tight breeding 'window' from strongly seasonal weather.

The preferred nesting sites are on flat or gently sloping ground or broad, flat ledges, on offshore islands, stacks or elevated areas on the mainland such as cliff-tops, generally between 15 and 90 metres (49 and 295 ft) above sea level. The ground may be bare or bear low shrubs such as Coprosma, Mesembryanthemum, Bulbine or grasses. The nests themselves are cup-shaped mounds 10–20 centimetres (3.9–7.9 in) high with a 30 cm (12 in) deep basin, made from seaweed, plants, earth and debris from the sea. The males usually collect the materials and give them to the females, who construct the nests. One egg is laid that can weigh anywhere from 84 to 125 g (3.0 to 4.4 oz), with an average of 99.8 g (3.52 oz). Matt pale blue and with an elongated egg shape, it measures 65–89 millimetres (2.6–3.5 in) long by 35–53 millimetres (1.4–2.1 in) wide. The egg surface fades to a white when dry and it has a chalky coating. Generally, only one brood takes place each season, though eggs and chicks up to eight days old will be replaced if lost. Incubation takes 37–50 days and is done mainly by the female, keeping the eggs warm on top of her webbed feet.

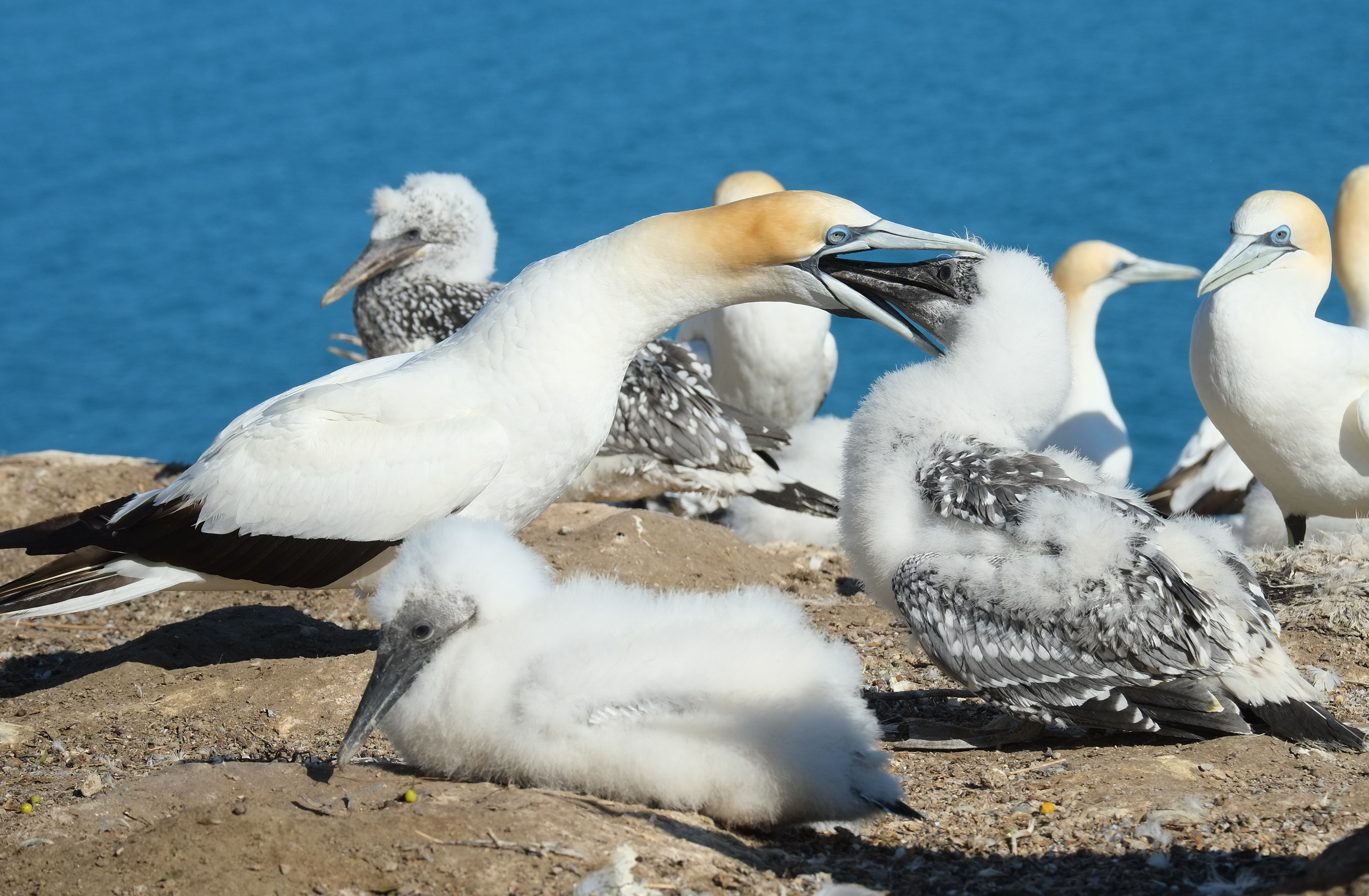
Adult feeding fledging chick

Newly hatched chicks are featherless and have black skin, their eyes opening at 2–3 days of age. They are covered with white down by two weeks old. The first proper feathers to appear are flight feathers, which appear between days 43 and 47. The chick becomes half-covered by feathers by 9 weeks of age. Young chicks are fed regurgitated semi-digested fish by their parents, who open their mouths wide for their young to fetch the food from the back of their throats.

The young birds fledge 95–109 days after hatching, heading to a nearby clifftop and remaining there for anywhere from 6 hours to 3 days before flying. Weighing on average 73.2 grams (2.58 oz) when born, they reach 2,350 grams (83 oz)—exceeding that of adult birds—by day 50 and 3,132 grams (110.5 oz) by day 90. Unlike young northern gannets, juvenile Australasian gannets are able to fly by the time they fledge and have fully grown primary flight feathers. They have smaller fat reserves, which may reflect a poorer food supply.

Young individuals return to the colonies when they are three years old, and begin breeding between four and seven years of age. The typical lifespan is estimated to be around 20 years. The maximum age recorded from banding has been 30 years 8.2 months; a bird tagged at Cape Kidnappers in January 1955 was found dead some 2,587 km (1,607 mi) away at Tangalooma in Moreton Bay, Queensland in September 1985. The longest distance travelled is 8,128 km (5,051 mi); a bird tagged at Lawrence Rocks was found washed ashore dead on the southeast coast of Mauritius.

=== Feeding ===
These birds are plunge divers and spectacular fishers, plunging from heights of up to 20 m (65 ft) into the ocean at high speed. They may dive from as low as 1–2 m (3–7 ft) above the surface at an angle to forage in water less than 3 m (10 ft) deep or in rough weather. They mainly eat forage fish which school near the surface, as well as cephalopods. Some local differences have been recorded: Australasian gannets at Farewell Spit mainly forage on coastal fish in water depths of less than 50 metres (160 ft), while those at Cape Kidnappers hunt more oceanic fish at water depths exceeding that. Birds also follow fishing vessels and trawlers to pick up discarded fish. Its bulk prevents it from hovering for a sustained period, but it can pause to examine the sea surface for fish.

The pilchard (Sardinops sagax) is a preferred prey item as it is an energy-rich source of food; after pilchard mass mortality events, Australasian gannets were able to adjust by switching to anchovy (Engraulis australis) at Farewell Spit in 1996 and barracouta (Thyrsites atun) in Port Phillip Bay in 1998. They also consumed correspondingly larger numbers of anchovies to maintain their caloric intake as this species has fewer calories than the pilchard. The increased expenditure for poorer return could feasibly impact on breeding success. In 1995, patrollers recovered 648 dead gannets along beaches in Auckland West and Northland West. The cause was unknown, but the 1995 pilchard mortality event and unusually strong westerly and southwesterly winds in July and August 1995 were implicated.

Other fish species reported eaten include kahawai (Arripis trutta), yellow-eye mullet (Aldrichetta forsteri), western Australian salmon (Arripis truttaceus), cape bonnetmouth (Emmelichthys nitidus), greenback horse mackerel (Trachurus declivis), yellowtail horse mackerel (Trachurus novaezelandiae), striped trumpeter (Latris lineata), New Zealand blueback sprat (Sprattus antipodum) and flyingfish of the genera Cheilopogon and Hirundichthys. Squid of the genus Nototodarus are among cephalopods eaten.

== Predators and parasites ==
The southern giant petrel (Macronectes giganteus) has been recorded preying on an adult Australasian gannet by holding it underwater and drowning it. Eggs and chicks can fall victim to the kelp gull (Larus dominicanus) and Pacific gull (Larus pacificus), particularly if parent birds have been disturbed.

External parasites include the feather mite species Morinyssus simplex—collected from a museum skin of Australasian gannet—the bird louse species Pectinopygus bassani, and the tick species Ixodes eudyptidis, the widespread Ixodes uriae and Carios capensis.

== Conservation status ==
The International Union for Conservation of Nature (IUCN) lists the Australasian gannet as a species of least concern, as the population is large and appears to be growing. There are possible impacts from commercial fishing, though this is probably low compared with other seabirds. Survival rates each breeding season can vary dramatically, most likely due to food availability and weather. More frequent El Niño–Southern Oscillation events lead to warmer water in Bass Strait, which gives rise to more fish and hence accounting for the increase in Australian waters.

Gannets established a mainland colony on Young Nick's Head near Gisborne, after decoys of nesting birds and pre-recorded calls were broadcast to passing gannets in September 2008. Successful breeding was recorded at the site from the 2010–11 breeding season onwards. A similar effort to establish a colony on Mana Island led to the arrival of a single gannet, dubbed Nigel "no mates", who lived alone among the 80 decoys for several years until he was found dead in February 2018; in summer 2018, three more gannets arrived at the site. Gannets have been enticed to established breeding colonies by decoys at reserves on Motuora Island.

== Relationship with humans ==
The Māori were reported to have harvested young gannets for food, visiting Kārewa in March. The white feathers of adult gannets were used to adorn canoes, and were worn by important members of the community. The bones were made into tools to apply facial moko (tattoos).

Some mainland colonies have become tourist attractions, such as those at Cape Kidnappers / Te Kauwae-a-Māui, and Muriwai in New Zealand, and Point Danger in Australia. The gannets of Cape Kidnappers have featured on New Zealand stamps issued in 1958 and 2009.
