= Hauling out =

Marine mammal behaviour

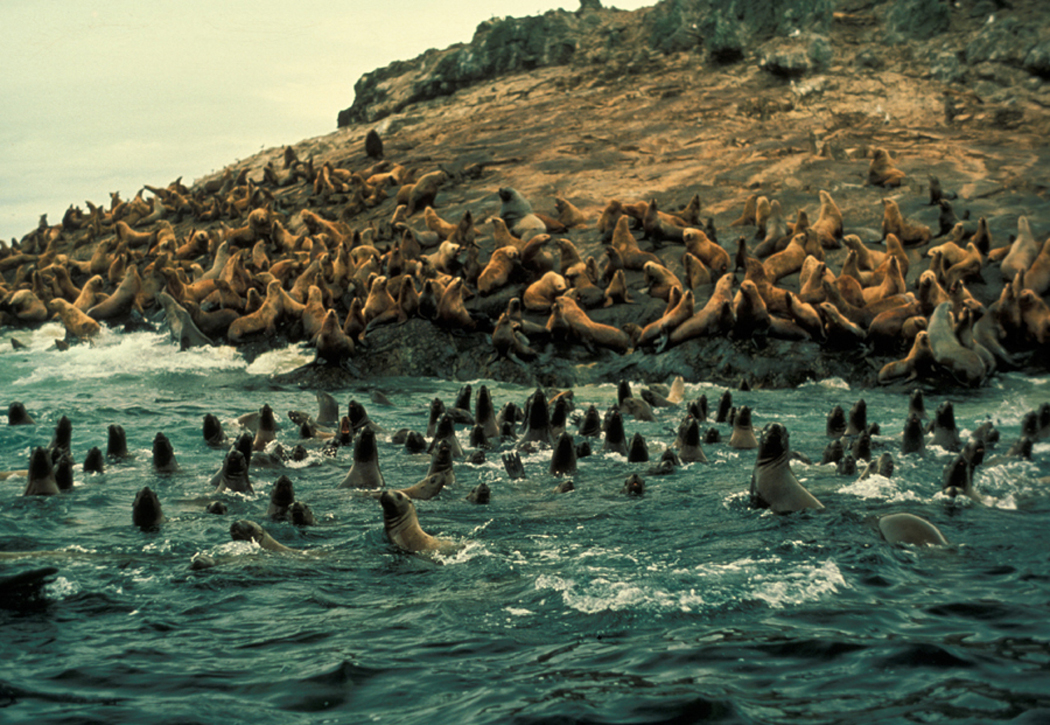
Sea lion group at haulout

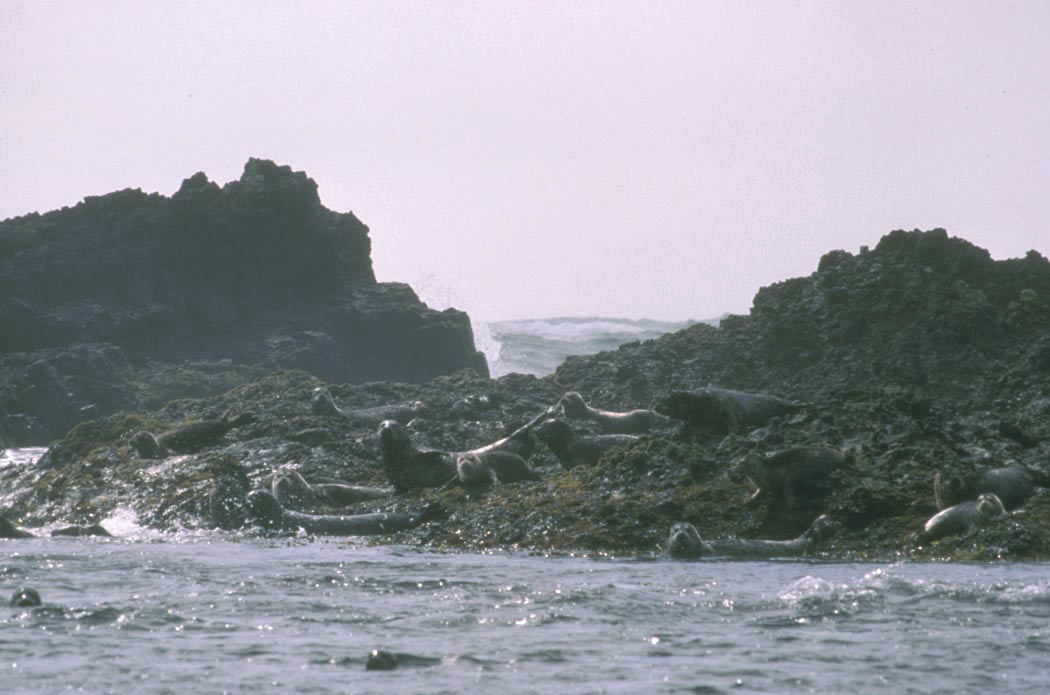
Harbor seals at haulout

Hauling out is a behaviour associated with pinnipeds (true seals, sea lions, fur seals and walruses) temporarily leaving the water. Hauling out typically occurs between periods of foraging activity. Rather than remain in the water, pinnipeds haul out onto land or sea ice for reasons such as reproduction and rest. Hauling out is necessary in seals for mating (with the exception of the Baikal seal) and giving birth (although a distinction is generally made between reproductive aggregations, termed "rookeries", and non-reproductive aggregations, "haulouts"). Other benefits of hauling out may include predator avoidance, thermoregulation, social activity, parasite reduction and rest.

There is much variation in haul-out patterns among different seal species. Haul-out sites may be segregated by age and sex within the same species. Many species of pinniped have only a few localized rookeries where they breed, but periodically occupy hundreds of haul-out sites throughout the range. For example, the Australian fur seals breed on only nine islands in Bass Strait but also occupy up to 50 haul-out sites in south-east Australian waters, and Steller sea lions have around 50 rookeries throughout their range, but several hundred haul-out sites.

Hauling-out behaviour provides numerous benefits to pinnipeds besides reproduction. This behaviour has been shown to be used for activities such as thermoregulation, predator avoidance, moulting, nursing, and resting. Haul-out frequency, duration, and site location (i.e. sea-ice, floating-ice, and terrestrial) are all influenced by physical constraints (i.e. air temperature, wind speed, and time of day) and biological constraints (i.e. moulting, age, and sex). Variations in hauling-out behaviour exist among pinnipeds for reasons such as geographical location.

== Examples ==
=== Weddell seals ===
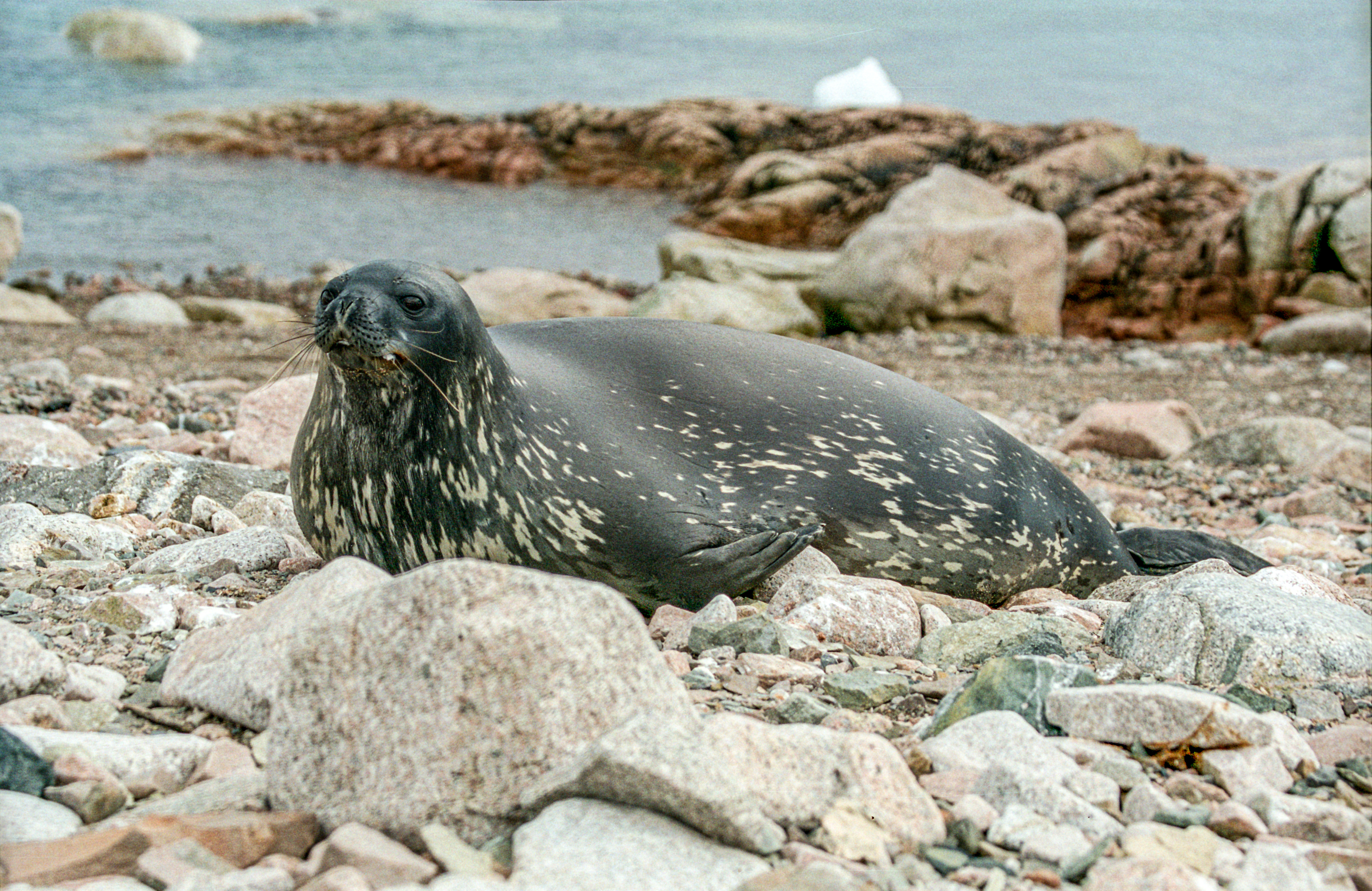
Weddell seal on terrestrial haul-out site.

Haul-out sites of Weddell seals are not necessarily geographically distinct from one another and vary due to physical factors (i.e. food availability) and biological factors (i.e. age). Weddell seals are high latitude Antarctic inhabitants, allowing them to haul-out onto ice as adults year round for foraging. Similar to other pinnipeds, Weddell seals haul-out for reasons such as feeding, rest, avoidance of predators, and thermoregulation. Seasonal variation has been indicated to influence the haul-out patterns of this species, environmental factors such as air temperature and wind speed trigger a shift from long-duration diurnal haul-outs to short-duration nocturnal patterns. Following moulting season the number of haul-outs performed increases allowing the seals to benefit from the increased air temperature and thus decreasing the energetic cost of growing new hair. The haul-out patterns of female Weddell seal are heavily influenced by the age of their pups. In the first week post parturition, haul-out frequency is high and females remain hauled-out for longer periods prior to the pups starting to swim. Haul-out frequency decreases as the pups are weaned and mating begins.

=== Walruses ===
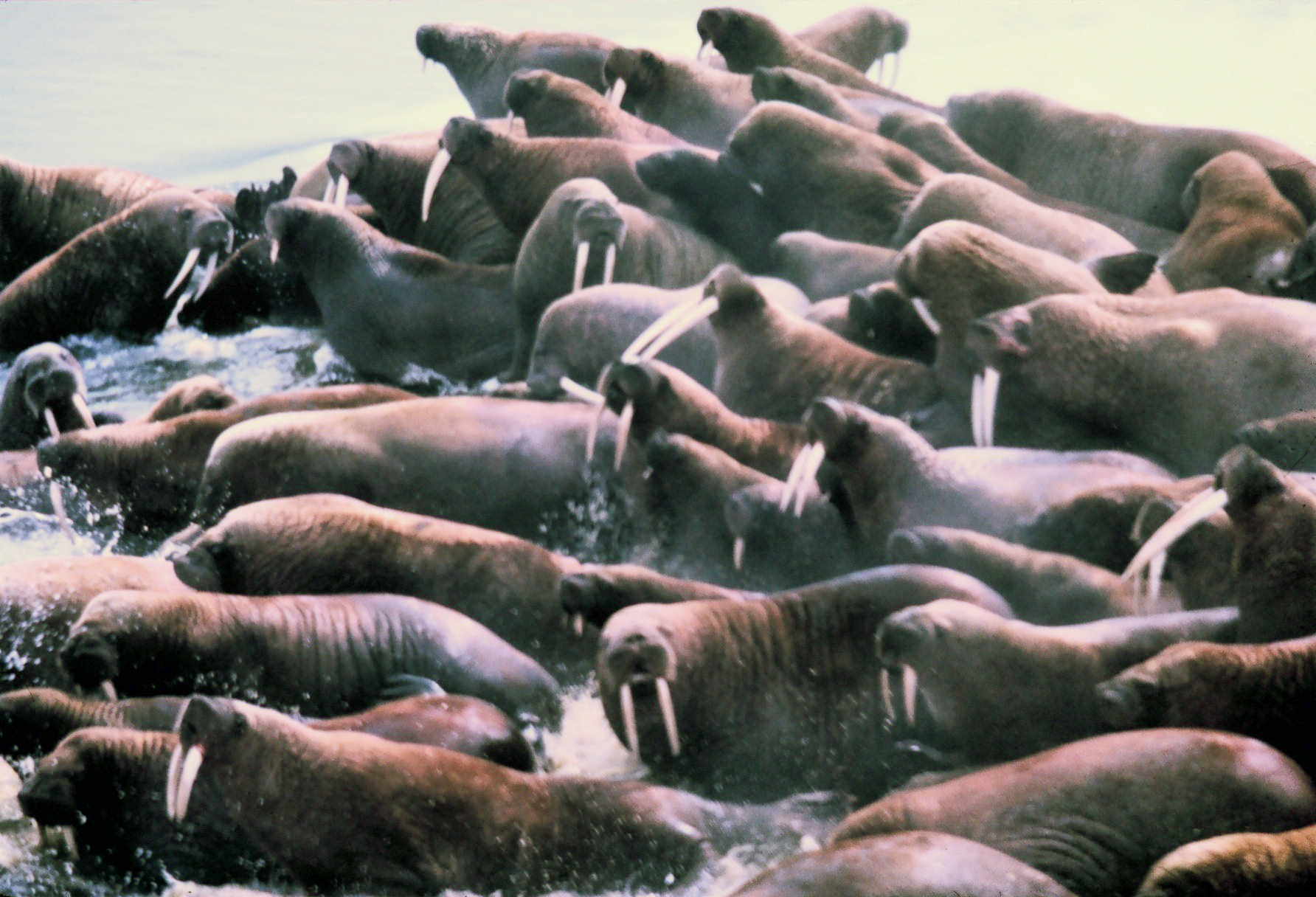
Group of walruses on sea-ice haul-out.

Walruses tend to occupy both terrestrial and sea ice haul-out sites, alternating between the two depending on resource availability. Walruses haul-out onto land primarily for birthing, moulting, nursing, and resting, meanwhile using sea-ice haul-out sites for foraging and predator avoidance. These physiological factors are correlated with both the duration and frequency of haul-outs among walruses. Sea ice sites are more commonly used for shorter and more frequent haul-outs compared to terrestrial sites, which are commonly used to fulfill more time-consuming requirements (i.e. breeding and birthing). Hauling out is also used as a method of thermoregulation, therefore it is influenced by various environmental factors such as wind speed, temperature, and even time of day. Accounting for these environmental factors, walruses more frequently haul-out from late morning to early evening and avoid hauling out during weather periods of intense cold or high winds. Haul-out frequency is at a maximum for walruses during the summer using terrestrial haul-out sites as sea ice sites are then further from foraging grounds. As female walruses haul-out for parturition, the males are territorial of the haul-out site surrounding the female herd. In these instances, hauling out provides an opportunity for more aggressive and territorial males to mate.

=== Ringed seal ===
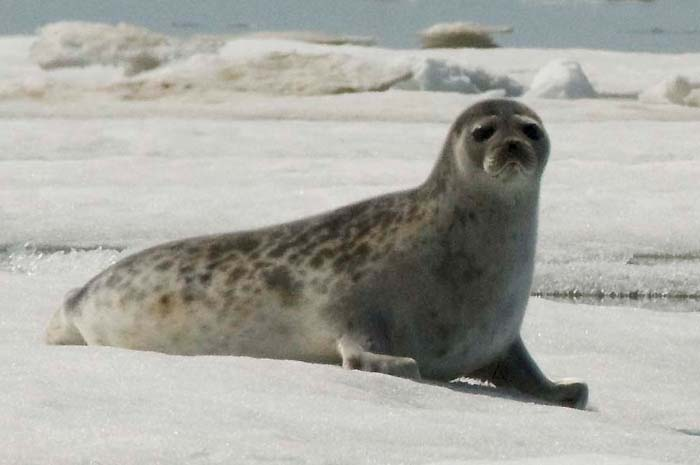
Ringed seal on sea-ice haulout

Ringed seal haulouts occur throughout any point in the year, however it reaches a maximum during the spring. In comparison to other pinniped species, ringed seals haul-out with a shorter duration year round. Ringed seals have a diel haul-out pattern in which they spend more time hauled-out during the night, an uncommon feature among pinnipeds. Hauling out spikes an increase in the herding behaviour of ringed seals, particularly in the Ladoga subspecies. Subspecies of the ringed seal prefer different haul-out sites depending on their geographical location and environmental constraints. For example, 5 subspecies of ringed seals prefer hauling out onto land-fast ice, however Phoca hispida ochotensis prefers drifting pack ice, meanwhile Phoca hispida hispida occupies both land-fast ice and far offshore areas of relatively stable ice. The majority of ringed seals however use terrestrial haul-out sites to create birth layers in the snow for newborn seal pups.

=== Harbour seal ===
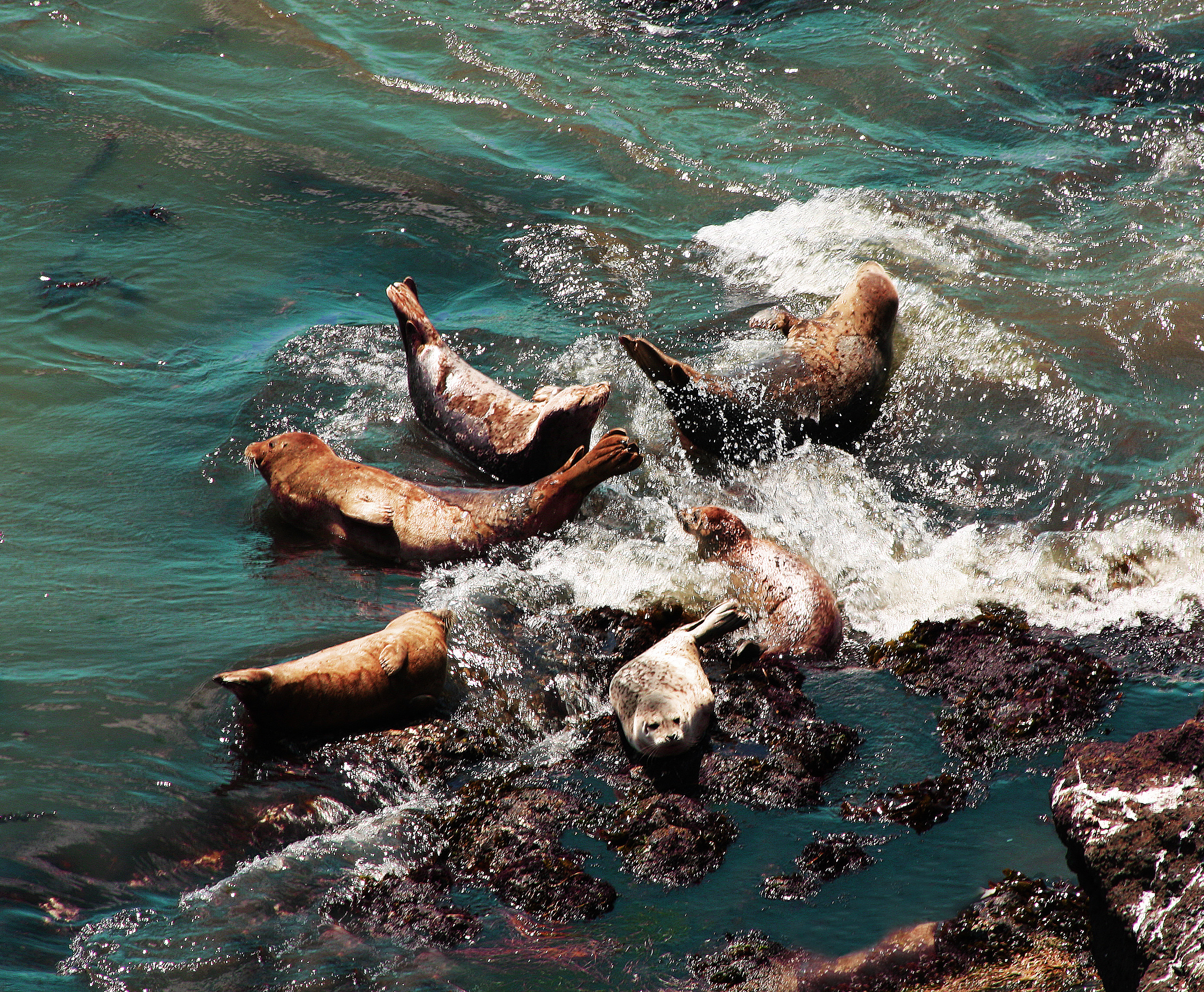
Harbour seals on intertidal site

Harbour seals are the most abundant pinniped in the eastern North Pacific Ocean. Much like other pinnipeds, harbour seals haul-out for reasons such as thermoregulation, breeding, mating, moulting, resting, and foraging. They commonly haul-out onto intertidal ledges, mudflats, beaches, and ice floes year round. Haulout sites are often revisited on a regular basis by the same herd and are heavily affected by tide height. Harbour seals are likely to move haul-out sites in response to inclement weather conditions (i.e. wind chill and wave size) to more favourable sites in rocky reefs, mudflats, and beaches that are exposed during lower tides.

Frequency and duration of the behaviour is at a maximum during early afternoon when lower tides and higher air temperatures are prevalent. During parturition and weaning, females spend more time hauled-out ashore until their pups begin to swim, meanwhile males spend less time hauled-out and maintain aquatic territories instead. Moulting and predation risk also increase the time spent hauled-out. Despite the increased time ashore for females and decreased time ashore or males during birthing and weaning, biological constraints such as age and sex have not been shown to effect harbour seal haul-outs. Both male and female harbour seals of all ages are consistent with time spent hauled-out. Harbour seals commonly inhabit regions susceptible to human disturbances (i.e. industries such as the fishery), a factor that has been studied and shown to alter haul-out patterns. Human disturbances negatively influence the duration and frequency of harbour seal haul-outs, decreasing the occurrence of this behaviour as human interference increases.
