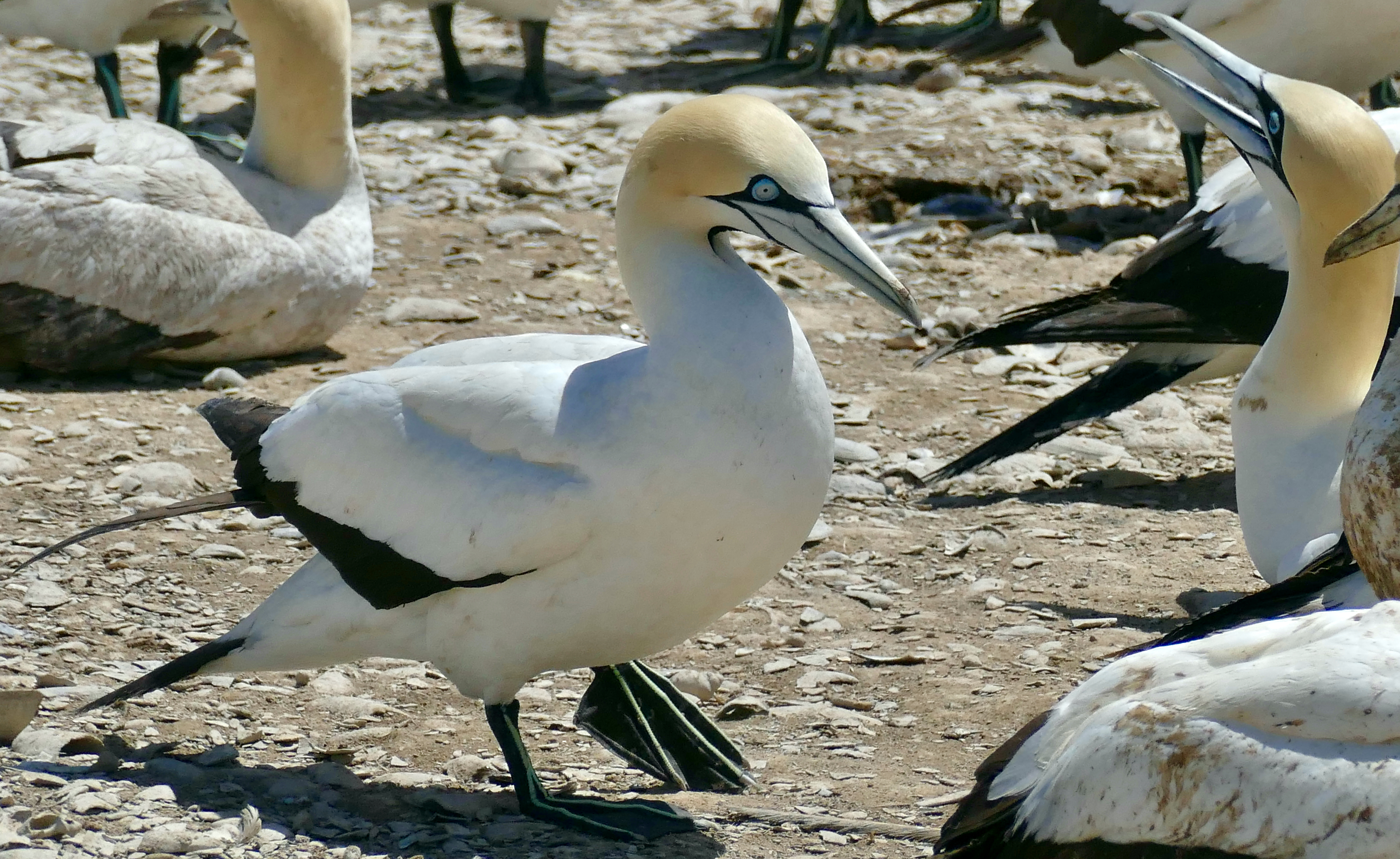
- Cape gannet, Bird Island, Lamberts Bay, South Africa
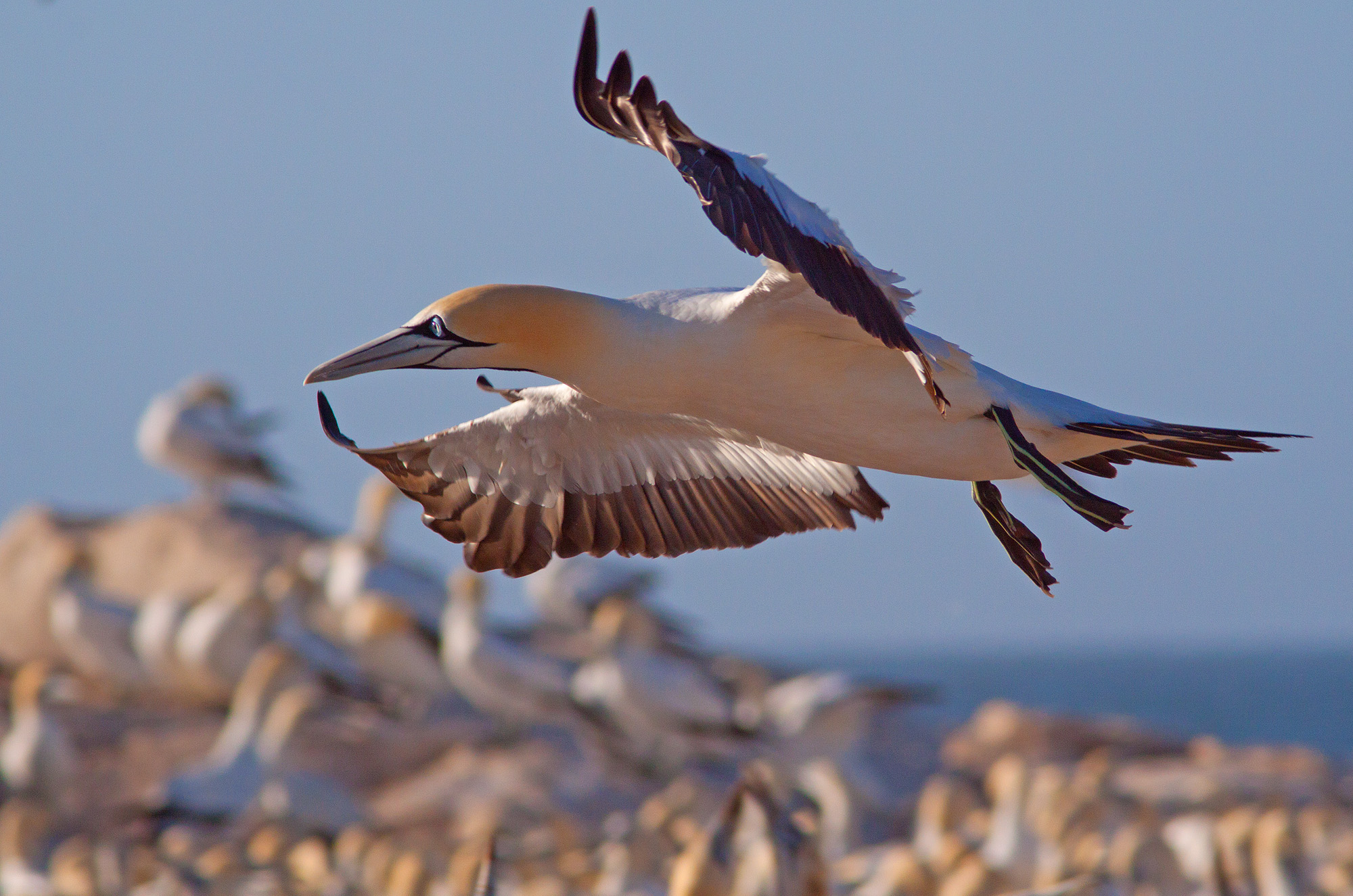
- Cape gannet in flight

Conservation status
- Endangered (IUCN 3.1)

Scientific classification
- Kingdom: Animalia
- Phylum: Chordata
- Class: Aves
- Order: Suliformes
- Family: Sulidae
- Genus: Morus
- Species: M. capensis

Binomial name
- Morus capensis (Lichtenstein, MHC, 1823)
- The breeding range of the Cape gannet is confined to six islands along the coast of Southern Africa, viz. Bird Island (Algoa Bay), Malgas Island, and Bird Island (Lambert's Bay) in South Africa. And the Penguin Islands of Mercury Island, Ichaboe Island and Possession Island in Namibia. Extant (breeding) Extant (non-breeding)

Synonyms
- Sula capensis

= Cape gannet =

Species of diving seabird

The Cape gannet (Morus capensis) is a large seabird of the gannet family, Sulidae.

They are easily identified by their large size, black and white plumage and distinctive yellow crown and hindneck. The pale blue bill is pointed with fine serrations near the tip; perhaps because of the depth and speed of the gannet's dive when fishing (depending on altitude, gannets hit the water at speeds of between 40 and 86 km/h (25 and 53 mph)), its beak has no external nostrils into which the water might be forced. The widely mentioned maximum speed of 120 km/h has never been measured and published.

== Taxonomy ==
German naturalist Hinrich Lichtenstein described the Cape gannet in 1823.

The Sulidae, the gannets and boobies, appeared about 30 million years ago. Early Sulidae fossils most resembled the boobies, although they were more aquatic, with the gannets splitting off later, about 16 million years ago. The gannets evolved in the northern hemisphere, later colonising the southern oceans. The most ancient extant species may be the Abbott's booby, possibly the sole survivor of an otherwise extinct separate lineage. A 2011 genetic study of nuclear and mitochondrial DNA suggests that the ancestor of the gannets arose around 2.5 million years ago before splitting into northern and southern lineages. The latter then splitting into the Cape and Australasian gannets around 0.5 million years ago. The three gannets are generally considered to be separate species forming a superspecies, though they have also formerly been classified as subspecies of the northern gannet (Sula bassanus).

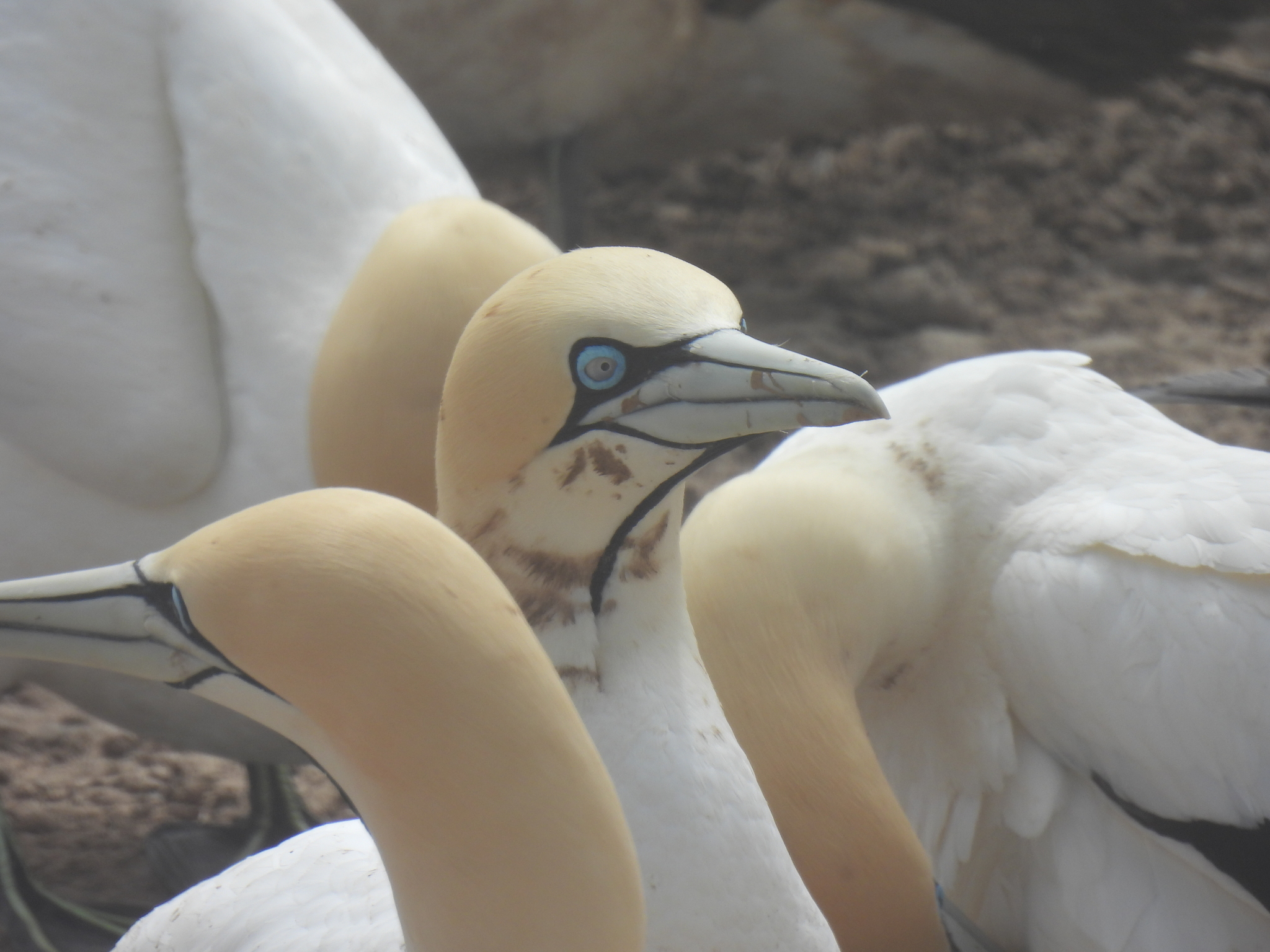
Close-up of the head

"Cape gannet" has been designated as the official common name for the species by the International Ornithologists' Union (IOC).

== Description ==
When seen in flight the snow-white body with the black tail, primaries and secondaries, and dark bill makes them easy to identify. At closer range the distinctive golden crown and nape, which gradually becomes white on the neck, is noticeable. Juveniles and immatures are dark brown with a pale bill, and can resemble the dark-coloured boobies at first glance.

Adults are about 84–94 cm (33–37 in) long and have a 171–185 cm (67–73 in) wingspan and weigh ca. 2.6 kg (5.7 lb).

The Cape gannet is identified from the Australasian gannet by the all-black tail, a longer black stripe down the throat (from underneath the beak) and more extensive black on the face, but all of these features are difficult to identify unless at close proximity. The Cape gannet is also very similar to the northern gannet, but the latter differs from its entirely white tail and its wings, which are only black at the tip. It also is similar to the blue-footed booby (Sula nebouxii).

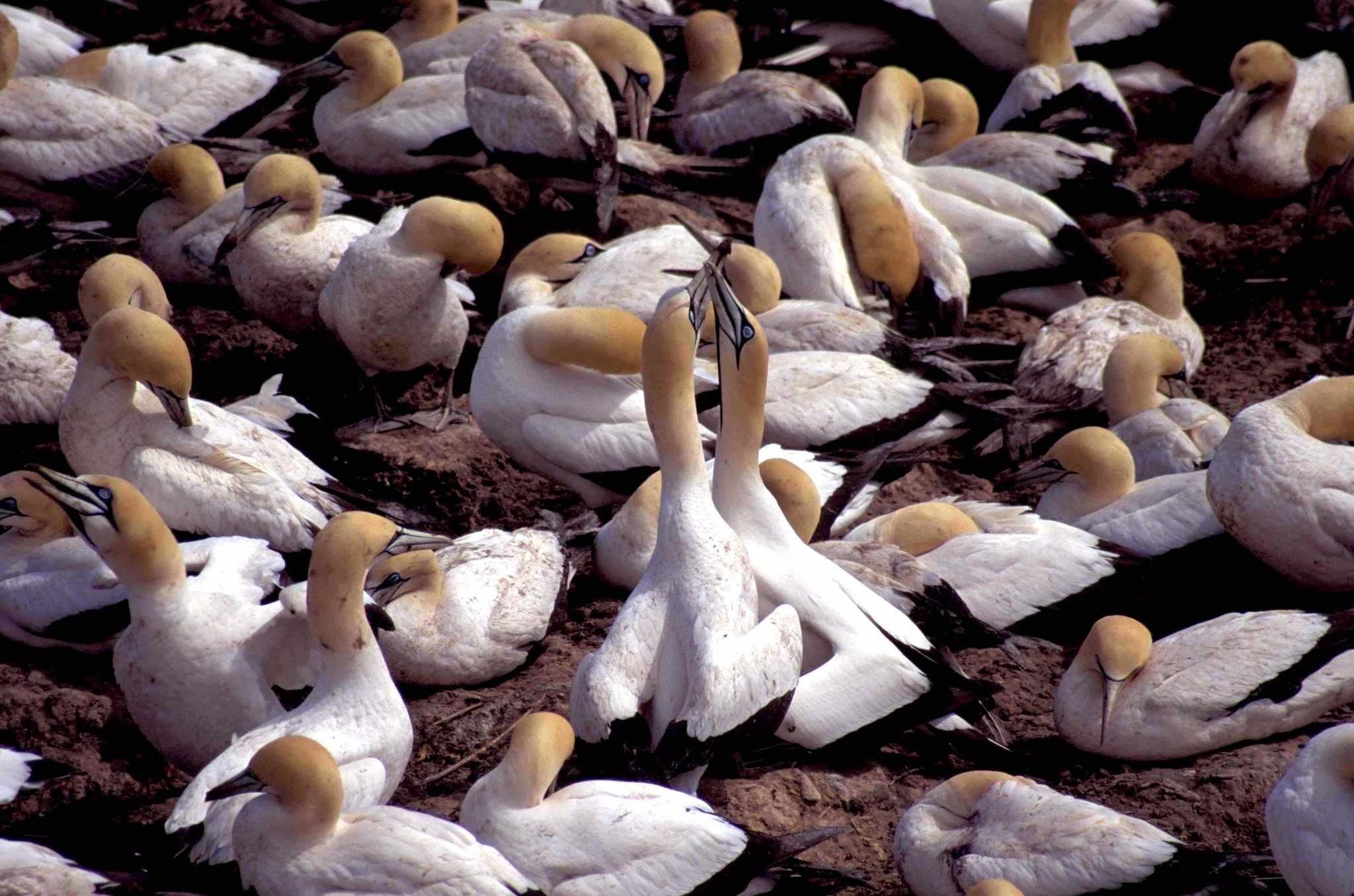
Greeting ritual

== Breeding ==
Gannet pairs may remain together over several seasons. They perform elaborate greeting rituals at the nest, stretching their bills and necks skywards and gently tapping bills together.

Cape gannets begin breeding in August or September. Typically the clutch is a single bluish egg, which soon becomes soiled. Both parents are actively involved in the incubation process which lasts for 42 to 46 days until hatching. Gannets use their foot webs to incubate the egg. The foot webs, which are richly irrigated with blood vessels are wrapped around the egg.

The hatchling is black, naked and blind, it weighs only about 70 g (2.5 oz), but within three weeks its body mass is one third of that of an adult. At eight weeks the chick outweighs the adult, and this remains so until it becomes a fledgling at 95–105 days of age.

== Feeding ==
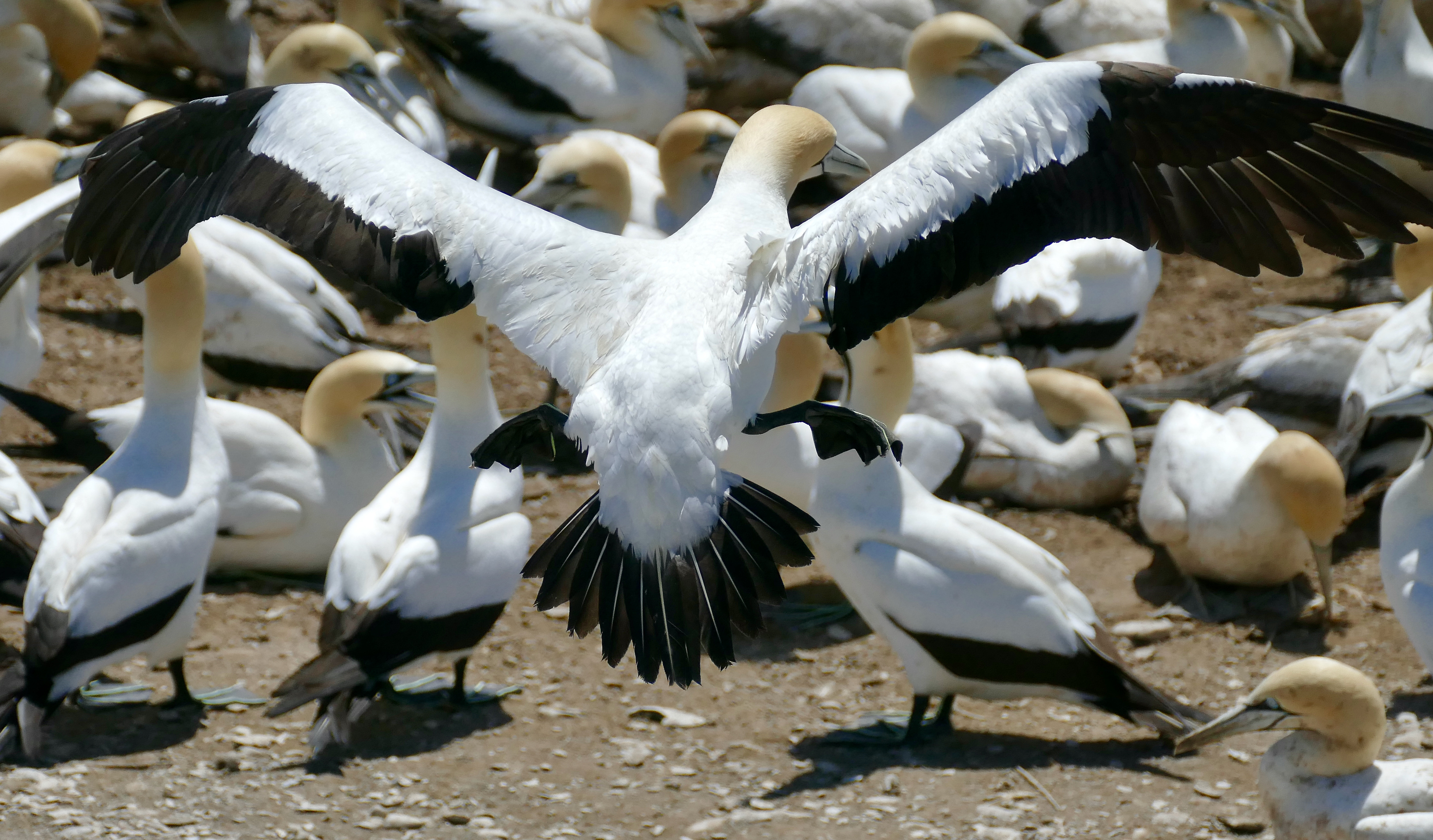
Cape gannet landing

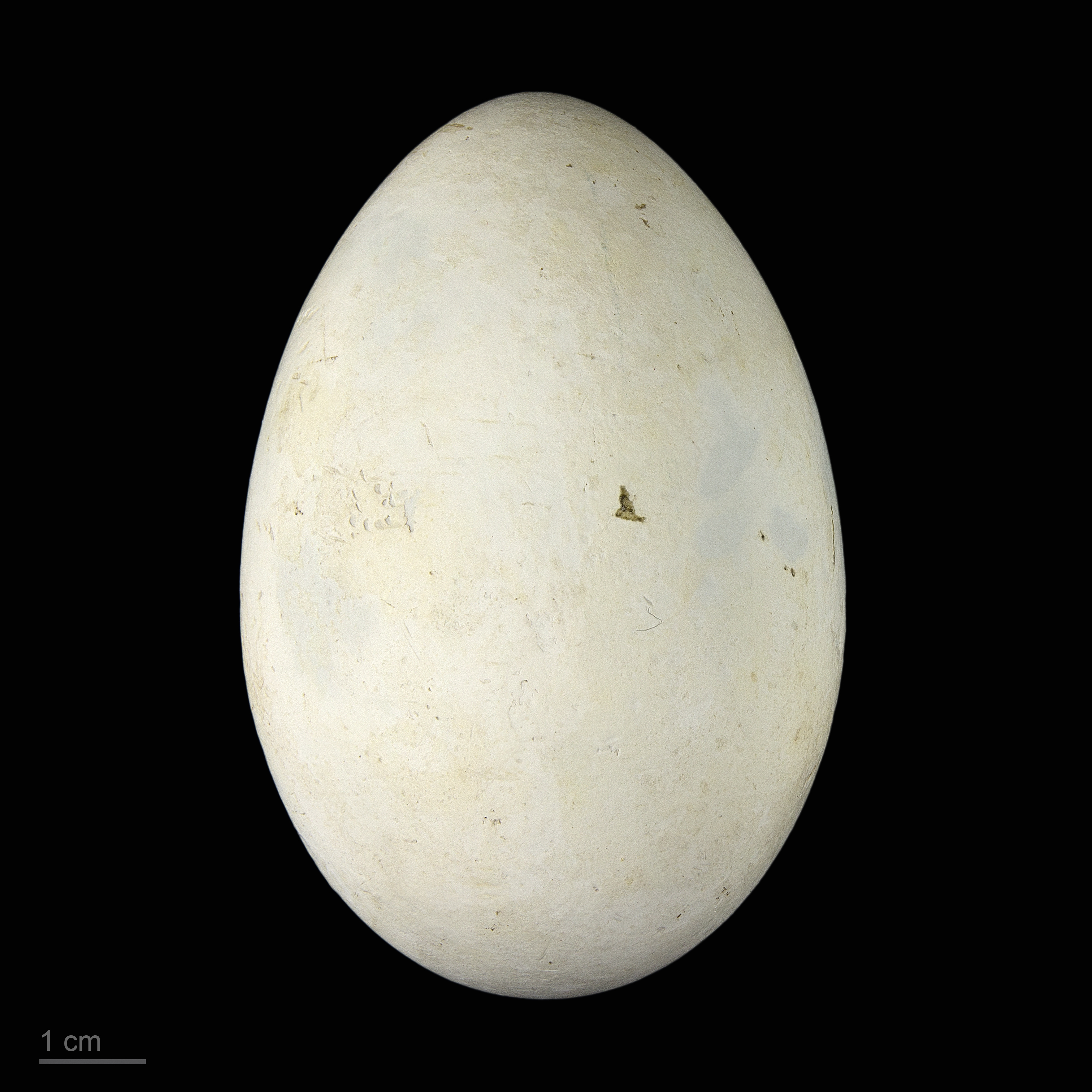
Morus capensis – MHNT

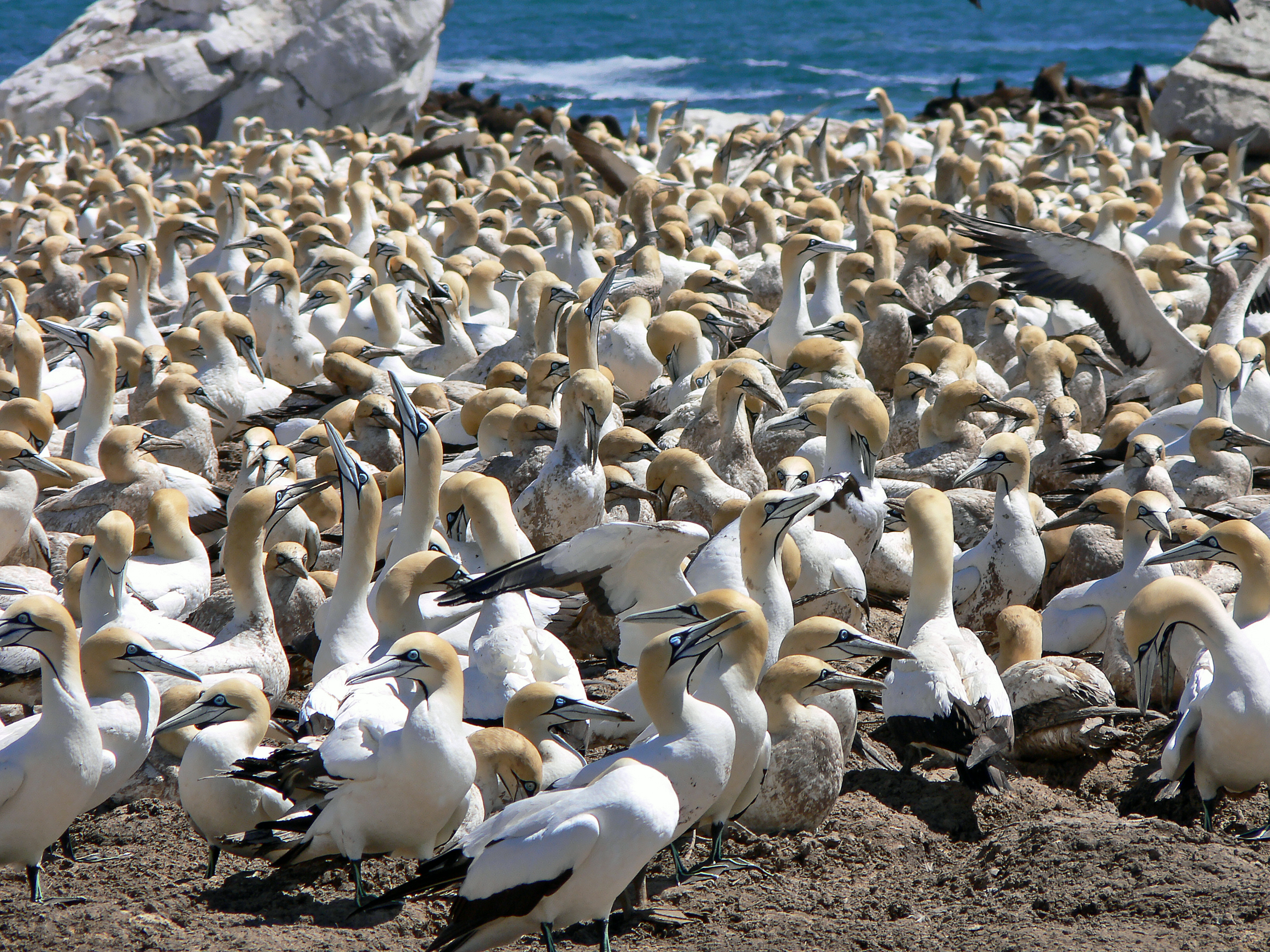
Cape gannet colony, Bird Island, Lambert's Bay, South Africa

Cape gannets are powerful fliers, using mainly a flap-gliding technique, which is more energy consuming than the dynamic-soaring favoured by albatrosses. As all Sulids, they are fish-eating birds that plunge-dive from considerable height.

== Status and distribution ==
=== Breeding and non-breeding range ===
The breeding range of the Cape gannet is restricted to southern Africa in three islands off Namibia and three islands off South Africa. They normally nest in large and dense colonies on flat islands or on flat ledges of the steeply sloping Mercury Island off Namibia. The world population was estimated in 1996 to number about 340,000 birds, with 12% in Namibia and 88% in South Africa. The largest colony of this bird, with over 140,000 birds, is found on Malgas Island, South Africa.

Vagrant Cape gannets have been known to successfully breed with Australasian gannets at Australian breeding colonies.

The non-breeding range of the Cape gannet extends from the coastal waters off the Gulf of Guinea on the west coast of Africa, to Mozambique on the east coast. They seldom occur farther offshore than 100 km, though records of birds more than 200 km offshore exist for both the Atlantic and Indian Oceans.

=== Population trends ===
Numbers of Cape gannets at the Namibian islands have declined considerably between 1956 and 2000 from 114,600 to 18,200 breeding pairs respectively, an 84% decrease in less than fifty years. This contrasts with the trends at the South African islands where numbers have increased about 4.3 times during the same period, from 34,400 to 148,000 breeding pairs.

=== Vagrancy ===
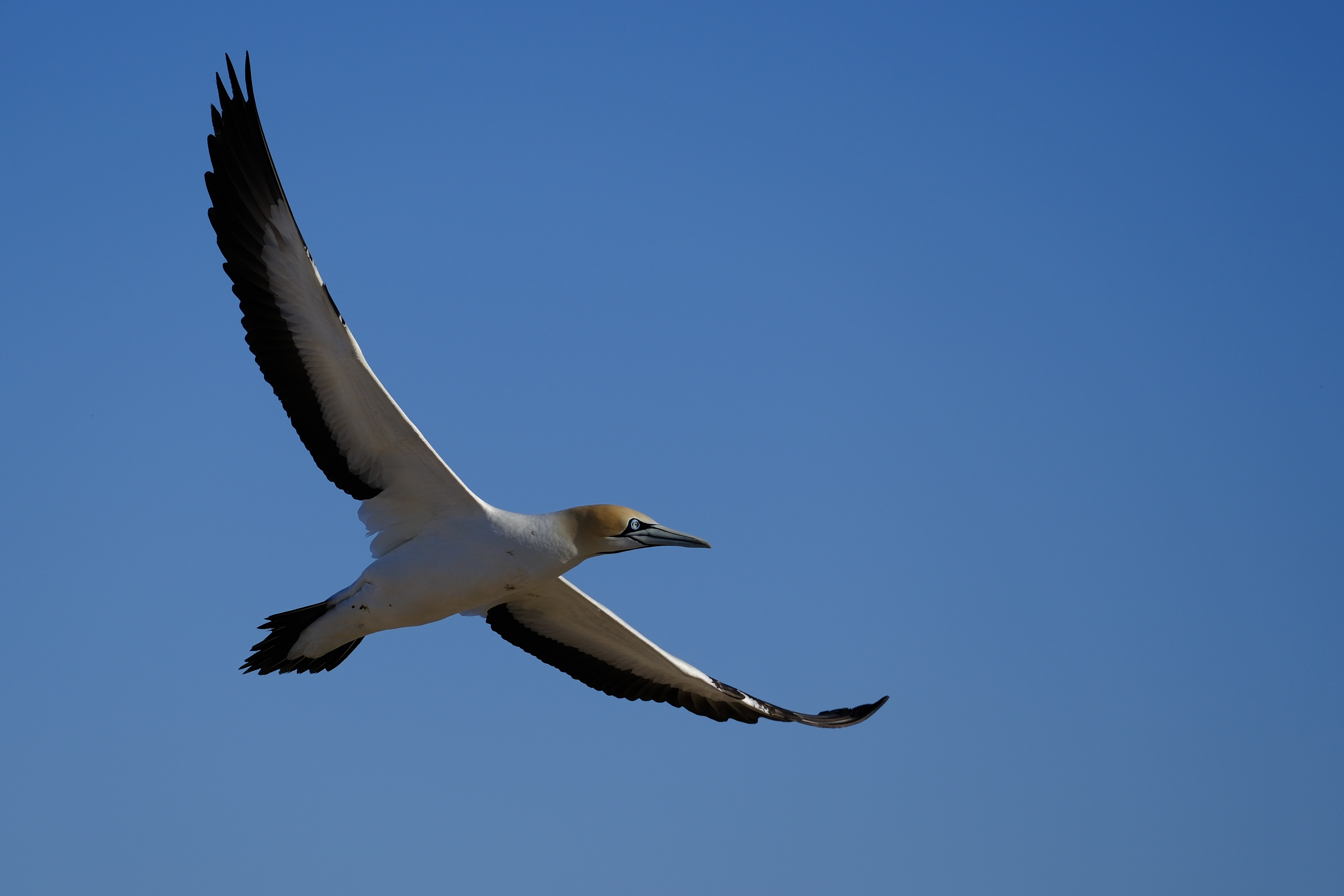
in flight, Lambert's Bay

Vagrancy to the northern Atlantic Ocean has been reported for the Cape gannet on several occasions, but until 2016 was believed to be unproven. Crochet and Haas examined the status of the species in the western Palearctic realm. They list a number of historical claims which had not been accepted by national bird records committees, and analyse the single record which had hitherto been widely accepted, a juvenile recovered offshore from Western Sahara in 1966. In relation to the latter bird, they conclude that a mistake had occurred; the original data placed the bird inland, in Chad, with the offshore Western Saharan location being the result of an attempt to correct this to a more plausible location. A retransposition of the original latitude and longitude gives a location off the Namibian coast, well within the regular wintering range of the species. As a result, they recommended that the Cape gannet be deleted from the Western Palearctic list. However, on 14 April 2016, a Cape gannet was photographed at sea off Flores in the Azores. The species has been discussed as a possible vagrant to Britain and Ireland, and there have been a number of claimed sightings, including one in December 2020 off the Isle of Wight, but there is yet to be an accepted record in the Western Palearctic apart from the Azores record. One Spanish record from 1985 has been accepted as either a Cape gannet or an Australasian gannet.

Cape gannets are known to occur in Australian waters as far east as Victoria (state) and at Australasian gannet breeding colonies. Though difficult to separate from their Australasian counterparts in the field, a bird caught at sea off southern Western Australia in 1986 was confirmed as a Cape gannet. Another vagrant was recorded in Port Philip Bay several times throughout the 1980s, while as many as seven birds were recorded at the Lawrence Rocks breeding colony in 1995. Further vagrants have been recorded at the Point Danger breeding colony on the western Victorian mainland since 2004.

Individuals have also been photographed in other locations far from the species' usual range, including off Peru in 1999 and Oman in 2004.
