= Lawrence Rocks =

Rocky islets in Victoria, Australia

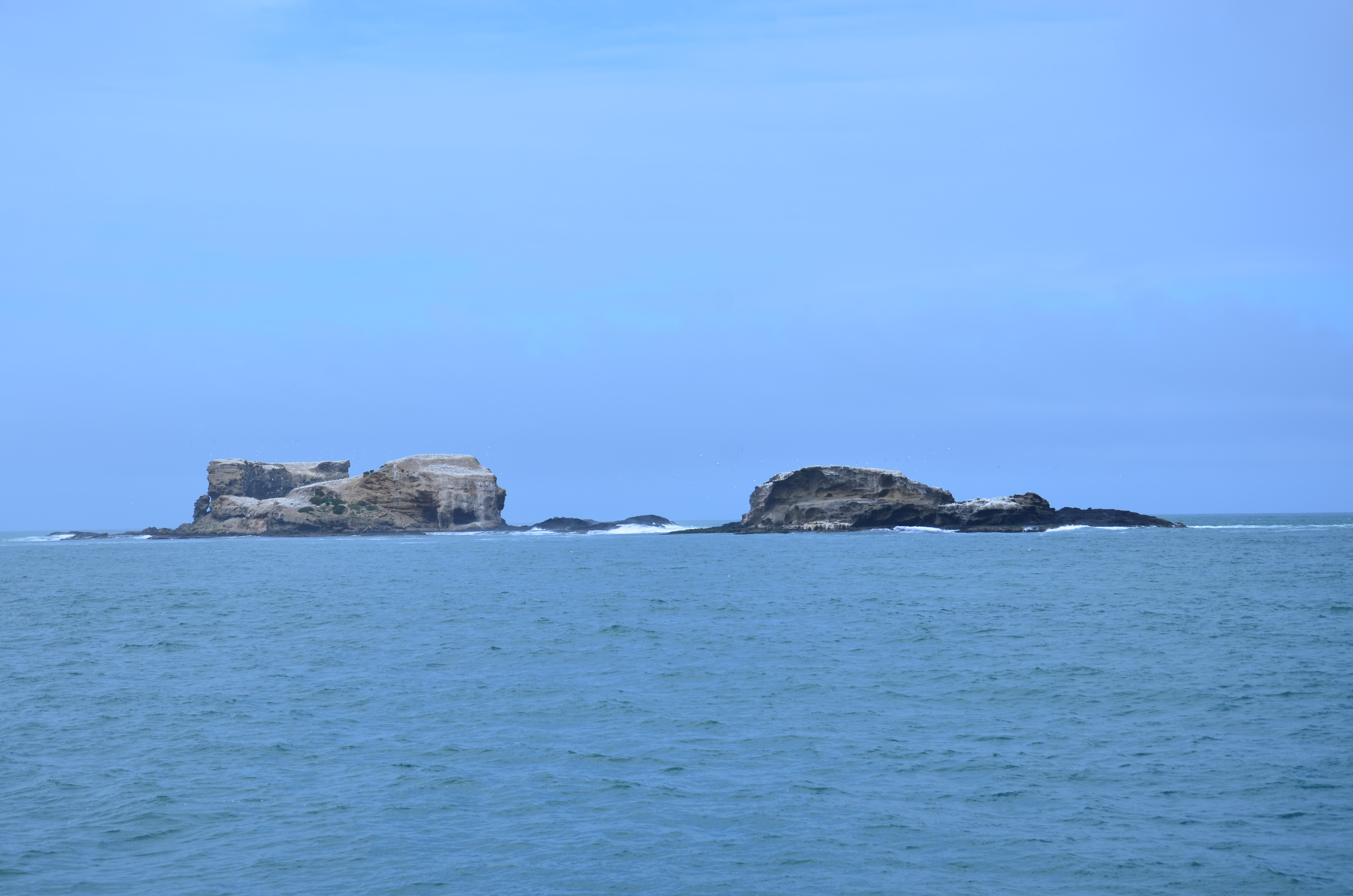
- Lawrence Rocks rocky islets in Western Victoria

- Location within Shire of Glenelg
- Etymology: Captain Effingham Lawrence

Geography
- Location: Bass Strait
- Coordinates: 38°24′30″S 141°40′10″E
- Area: 7 ha (17 acres)
- Length: 800 m (2600 ft)
- Width: 50 m (160 ft)
- Highest elevation: 90 m (300 ft)

Administration
- Australia
- State: Victoria

The Lawrence Rocks are a group of two rocky islets, 6.8 ha and 1.5 ha in area, with an associated reef, 2.4 km south-east of Point Danger in western Victoria, Australia, and about 6 km south-east of the city of Portland. The rocks are called Poort by the Gunditjmara people. Geologically, the group is formed from the remnants of an extinct volcano, with the islets composed of basalt and tuff.

The islets were sighted by Lieutenant James Grant on 5 December 1800 from the survey brig HMS Lady Nelson and named for Captain Effingham Lawrence, one of the Elder Brethren of Trinity House.

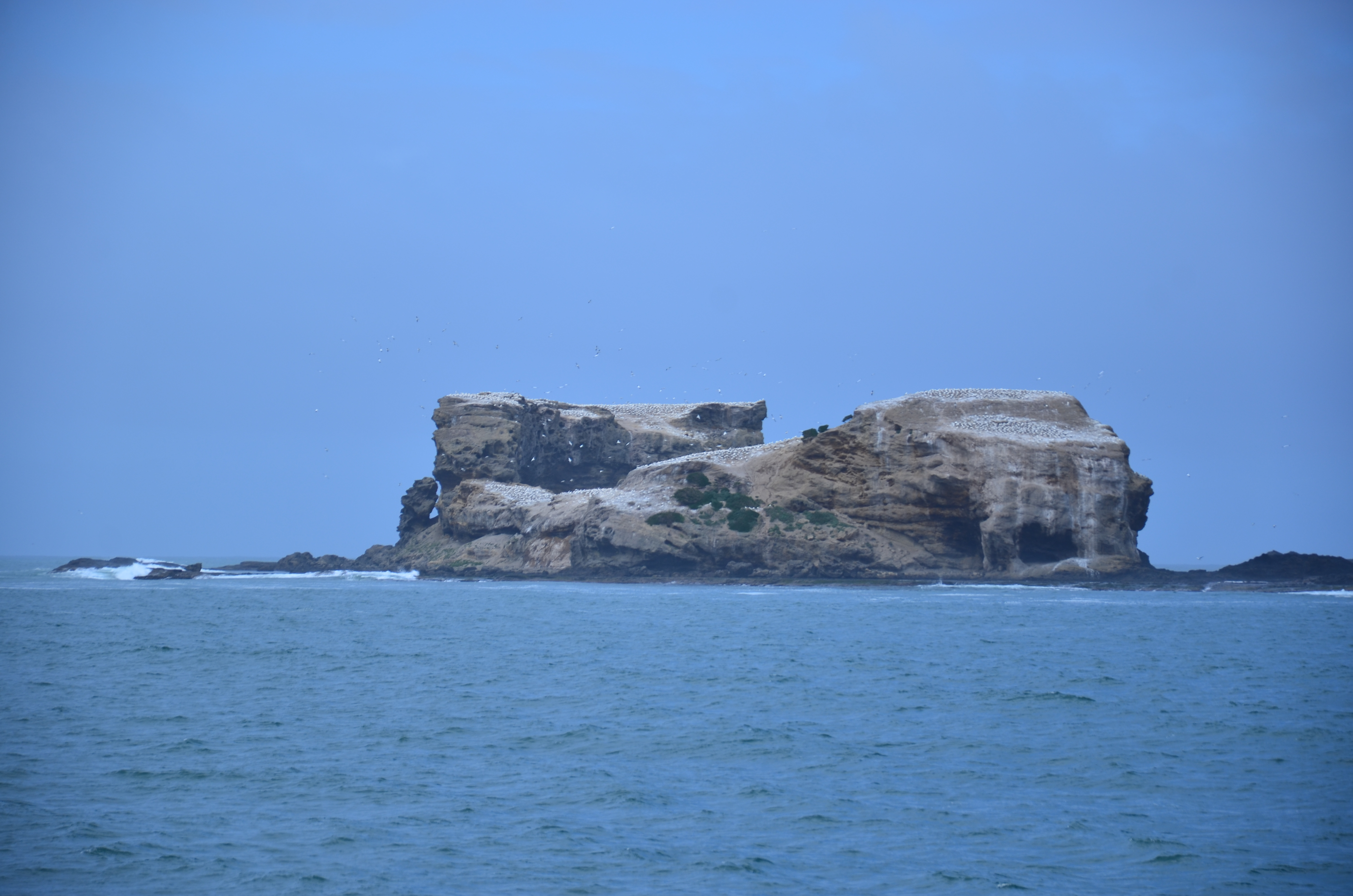
Image taken aboard Southern Coast Charters of Lawrence Rocks rocky islets in Western Victoria.

== Fauna ==
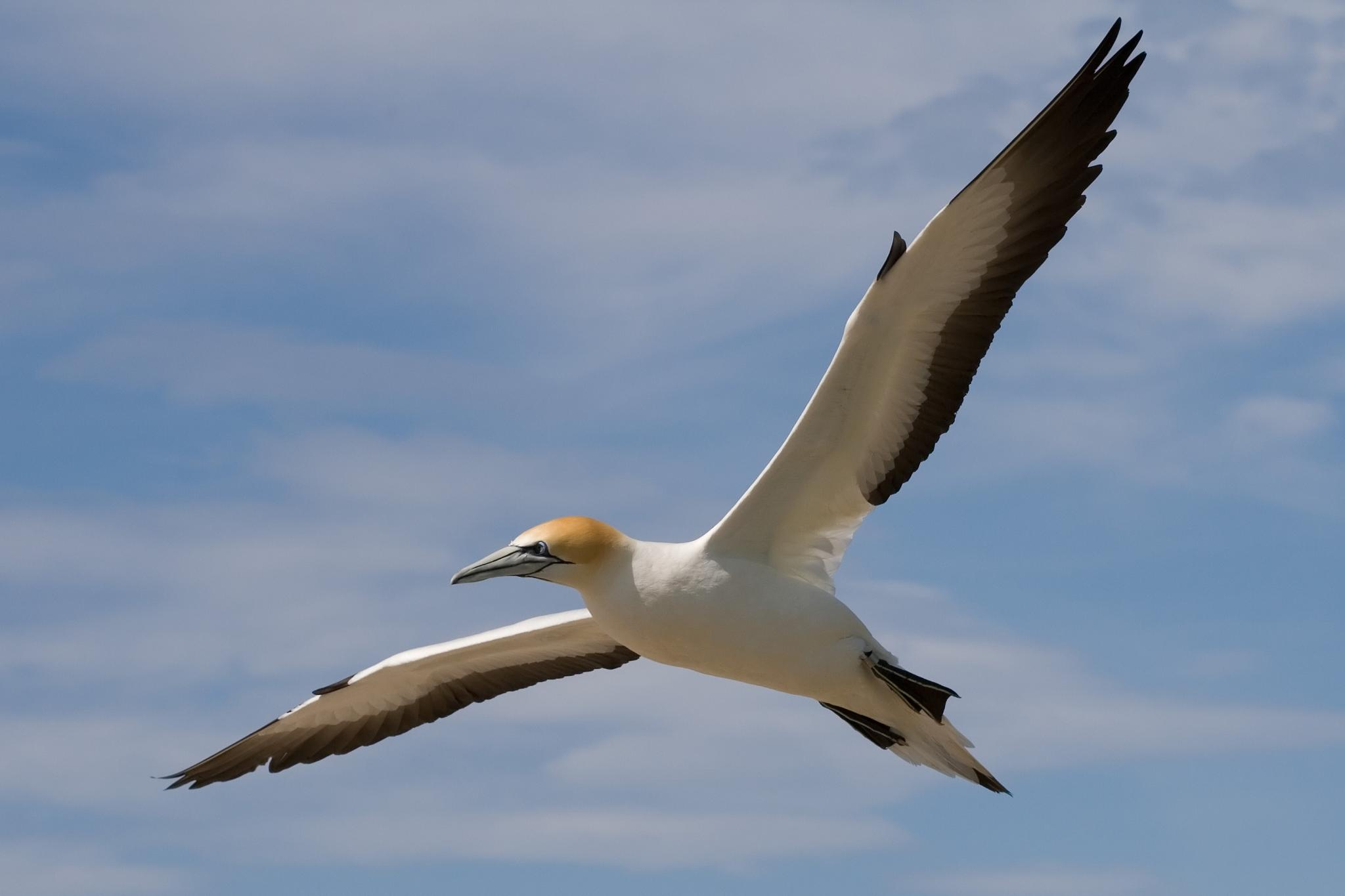
The Lawrence Rocks are an important breeding site for Australasian gannets

The rocks are protected as a nature reserve and are the site of a breeding colony of Australasian gannets, the overspill from which led to the establishment of a sister colony at Point Danger. The group has been identified by BirdLife International as an Important Bird Area (IBA), because it supports over 10% of the world population of Australasian gannets, being used by over 6000 birds. Other birds recorded on the rocks, and likely to breed there, include little penguins, black-faced cormorants, crested terns, silver gulls, sooty oystercatchers and small numbers of Cape gannets. The rocks are also used as a haul-out site by Australian fur seals. Seal hunting was conducted on the island in the 19th century.

== Recreational dive sites ==
There are several named sites:

- The Nursery, at the eastern side, where there are four caves, one known as the Cockpit with a small chamber at the top, at 38° 24.280′ S, 141° 40.260′ E
- North Point, a boulder ridge off the northern end of Lawrence Rocks, at 38° 24.225′ S, 141° 40.004′ E
- The Saddle, a gully that cuts through the centre of the rocks, at 38° 24.331′ S, 141° 40.082′ E
- The Harbour, an area of gutters, ledges and swim-throughs, at 38° 24.514′ S, 141° 40.136′ E
- The wreck of the Emily S, a short distance northeast from Lawrence Rocks.
