= Malgas Island =

Island at the entrance to Saldanha Bay, South Africa

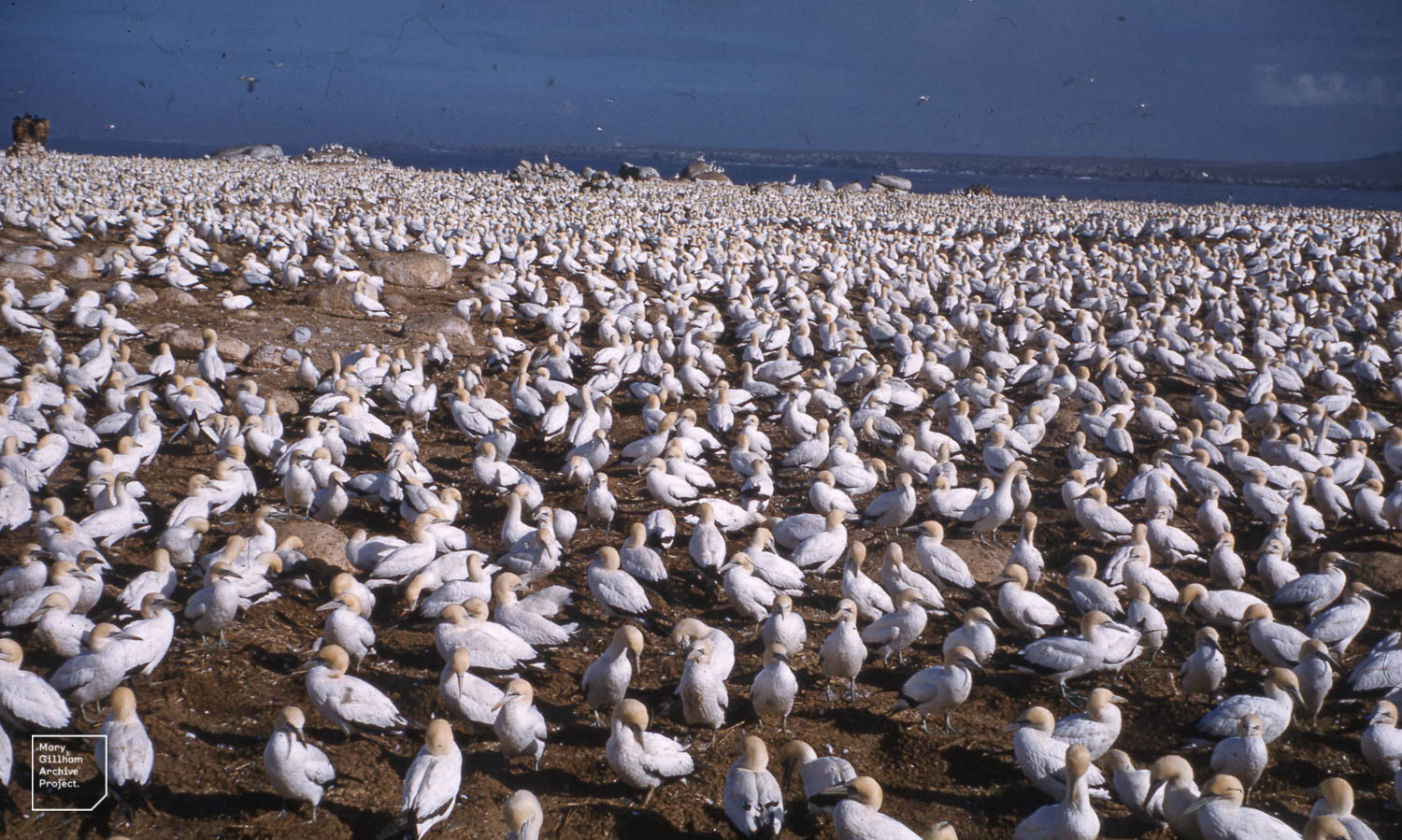
- Gannets on Malgas Island

Geography
- Location: Lambertsbaai, South Africa
- Coordinates: 33°03′10″S 17°55′31″E

Administration
- South Africa

Malgas Island is a small, 8.3 hectares (21 acres), uninhabited island lying in the northern part of the entrance to Saldanha Bay, in the Western Cape province of South Africa. It lies about 800 metres (2,600 ft) from the mainland in the Benguela upwelling system. It is circular in shape and flat, with the highest point about 9 metres (30 ft) above sea level. It is known for its large breeding colony of Cape gannets.

== History ==
Malgas was subject to guano removal in 1845, an activity which also resulted in the presence of low retaining walls, paths and, on the eastern side, several buildings and a jetty. Since 1986 it has been part of the West Coast National Park.

== Birds ==
Most of the central part of the island is occupied by the Cape gannet colony, one of only six in the world, and which, with some 20,000 breeding pairs, holds 25% of the world population. Other breeding seabirds include bank and Cape cormorants, kelp and Hartlaub's gulls, and African penguins. African black oystercatchers are also resident. The island forms part of the West Coast National Park and Saldanha Bay Islands Important Bird Area, identified as such by BirdLife International. Therefore, only select researchers will be allowed to go ashore. The Cape gannets have been studied intensely, and their breeding success is watched over by Honorary Rangers.
