= Portland Bay =

Portland Bay (Kardermudelar / Pathowwererer)
- Location in Victoria
- Location: Victoria
- Coordinates: 38°19′44″S 141°38′10″E
- Type: Bay
- Basin countries: Australia
- Frozen: never
- Settlements: Portland

Portland Bay (Dhauwurdwurrung: Kardermudelar / Pathowwererer) is a small bay off the coast of Victoria, Australia. It is about 360 kilometres (220 mi) west of Melbourne. The city of Portland is located on the bay. The western end of the bay is marked by the headland of Point Danger.

The bay was named after the Duke of Portland, a Secretary of State and later Prime Minister of Great Britain, by Lieutenant James Grant sailing on the Lady Nelson, on 7 December 1800. The town of Portland later took its name from the bay.
