= Bird Island Nature Reserve (South Africa) =

Protected area in Lambert's Bay, South Africa

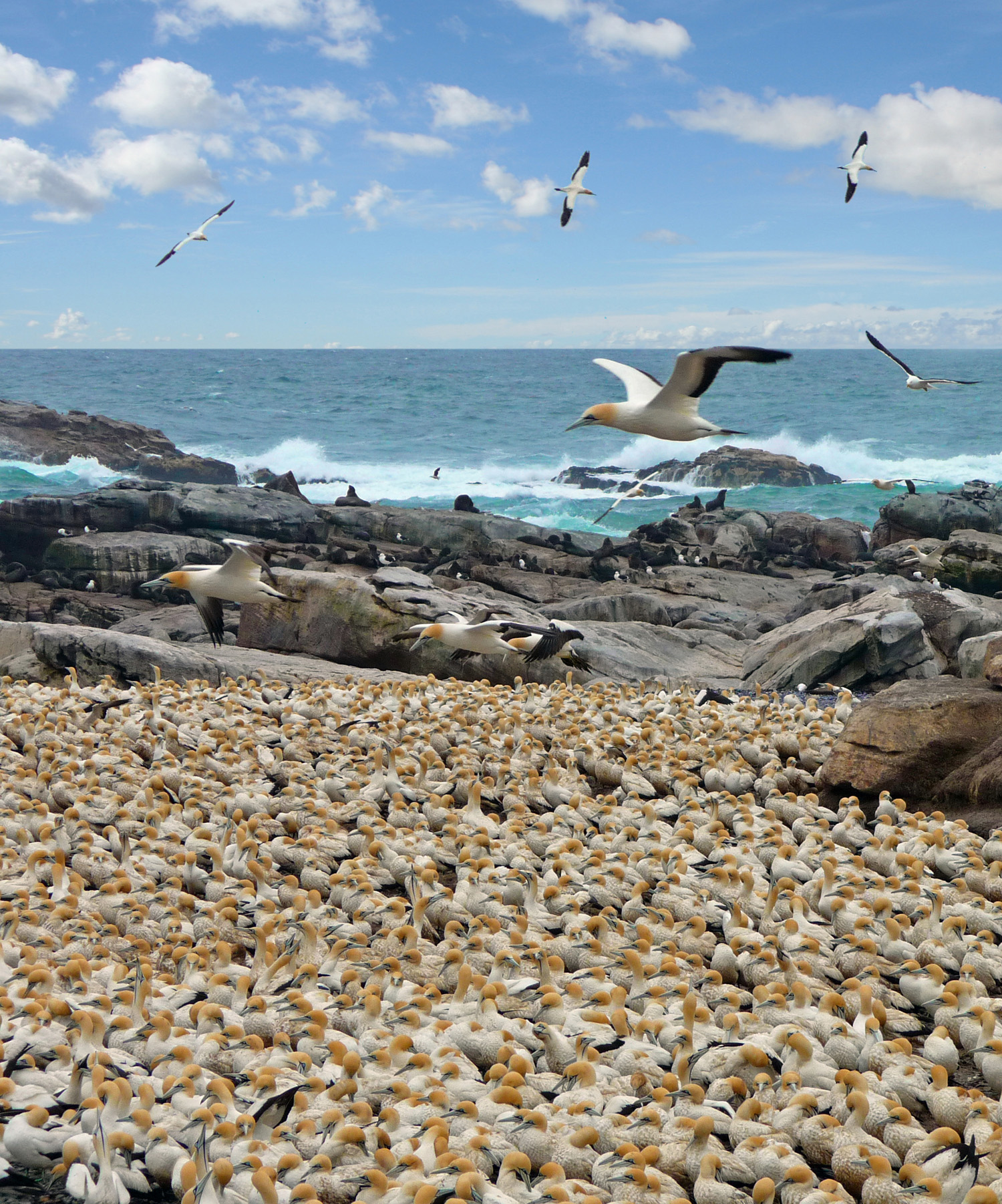
- Cape gannet (Morus capensis) breeding colony in Bird Island Nature Reserve
- Location: Lambert's Bay, Cederberg Local Municipality, South Africa
- Coordinates: 32.0899°S 18.30258°E
- Area: 3 ha (7.4 acres)
- Established: 18 March 1988; 38 years ago
- Governing body: CapeNature
- Website: Lambert's Bay Bird Island Nature Reserve - CapeNature
- Bird Island Nature Reserve (South Africa) (Western Cape) Bird Island Nature Reserve (South Africa) (South Africa)

Bird Island Nature Reserve is a 3-hectare (7.4-acre) nature reserve in Lambert's Bay, South Africa. It is an important breeding site for the endangered Cape gannet and crowned cormorant.

== History ==
Bird guano was collected on the island for fertiliser from 1888 until 1990. In 1988, it was officially established as the Lambert’s Bay Penguin Island Provincial Nature Reserve. The island is now a tourist attraction.

== Gallery ==
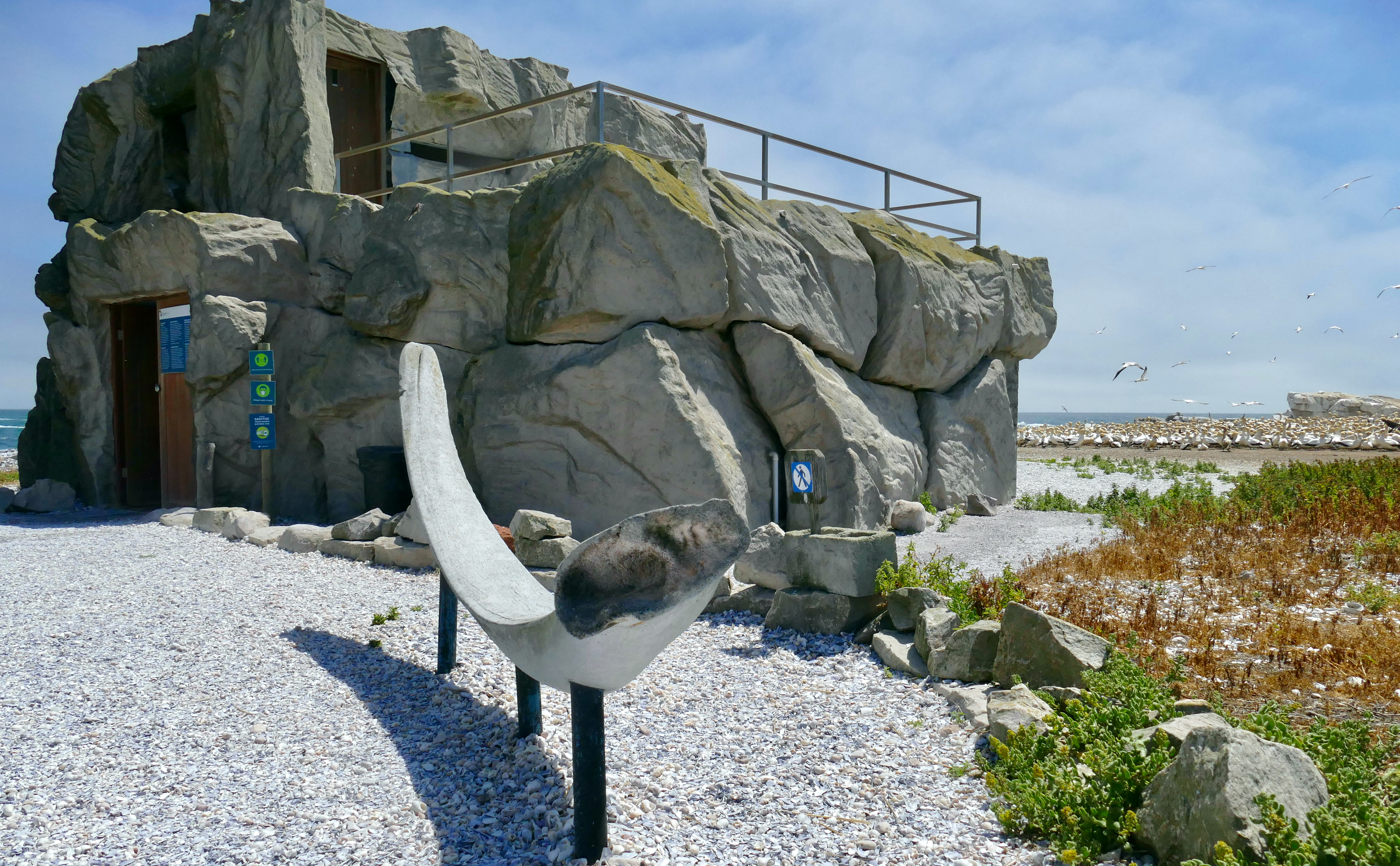
Gannet lookout

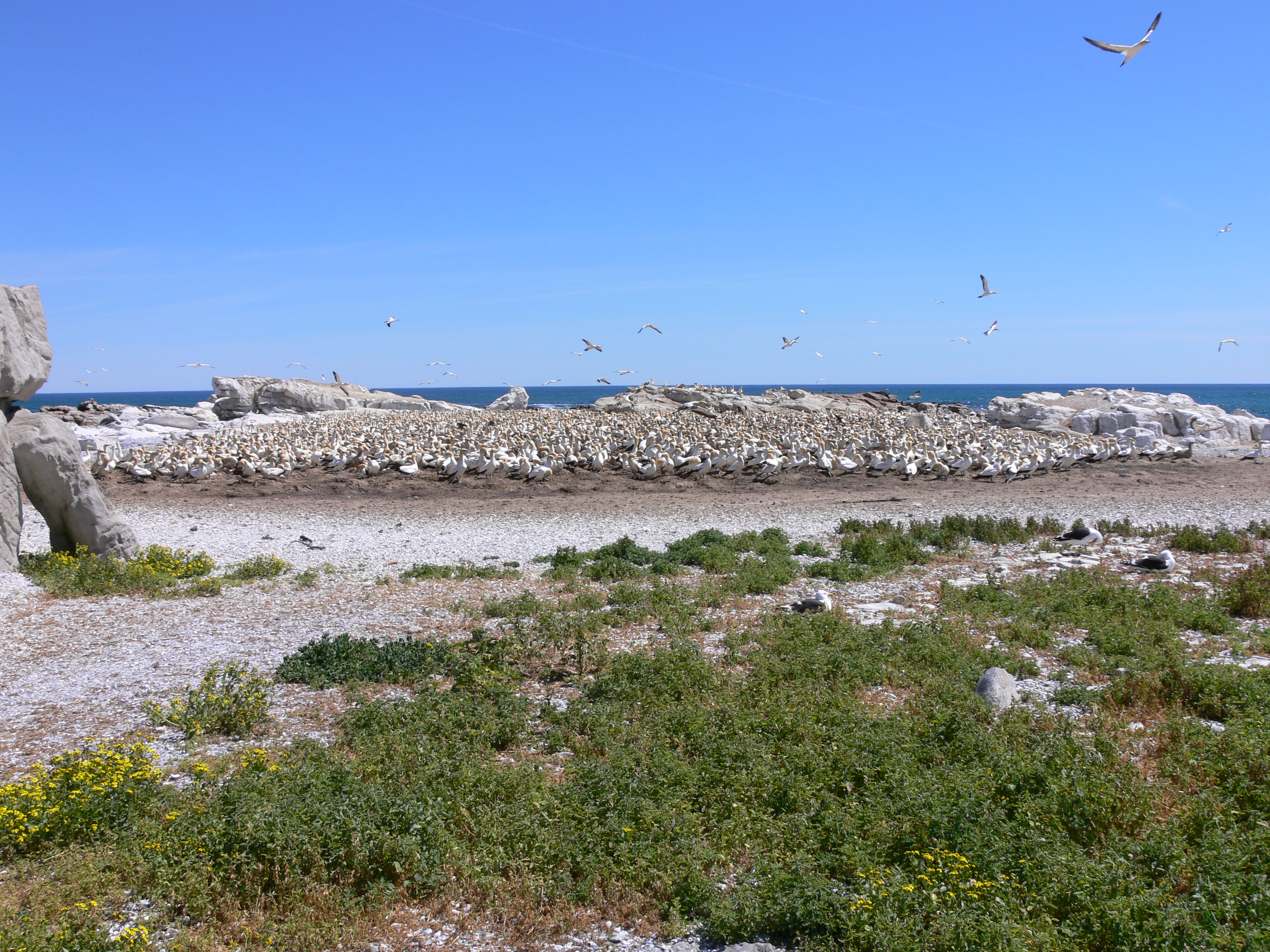
Gannet breeding colony
