= Lambert's Bay =

Lambert's Bay Lambertsbaai
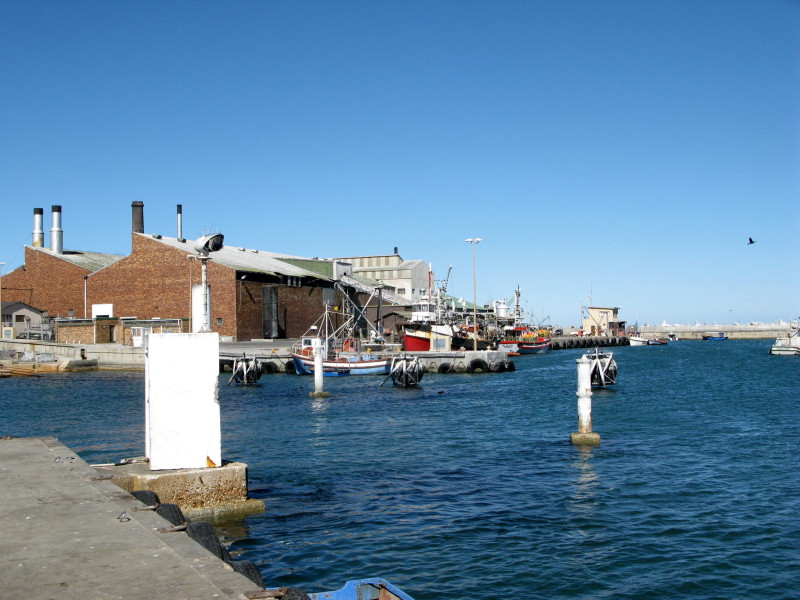
- Lambert's Bay

- Location within Western Cape Location within South Africa
- Coordinates: 32°5′S 18°18′E
- Country: South Africa
- Province: Western Cape
- District: West Coast
- Municipality: Cederberg

Area
  - Total: 45.73 km^{2} (17.66 sq mi)

Population (2011)
  - Total: 6,120
  - Density: 134/km^{2} (347/sq mi)

Racial makeup (2011)
  - Black African: 9.0%
  - Coloured: 74.5%
  - Indian/Asian: 0.2%
  - White: 15.9%
  - Other: 0.4%

First languages (2011)
  - Afrikaans: 90.9%
  - Xhosa: 5.8%
  - English: 1.7%
  - Other: 1.6%
- Time zone: UTC+2 (SAST)
- Postal code (street): 8130
- PO box: 8130
- Area code: 027

Lambert's Bay (Lambertsbaai in Afrikaans) is a small coastal town in the Western Cape province of South Africa situated 280 kilometres (170 mi) north of Cape Town. It is part of the Cederberg Municipality.

The coast town has been proclaimed 'the Diamond of the West Coast' because of its white beaches, wildlife and lobsters. Although previously a primarily a fishing town, it has been converted to potato processing and has become a significant tourist attraction on the West Coast due to its moderate all-year climate.

== Birding ==
- Bird Island Nature Reserve – The nesting and breeding ground of thousands of Cape gannets, penguins and other bird species can be reached by walking on a breakwater wall.

== History ==
Lambert's Bay is named after Admiral Lambert of the British Navy who did a marine survey of the bay between 1826 and 1840.

In 1887 Mr Stephan bought the commercial buildings and built the hotel in 1888. Lambert's Bay was used as a lay-up for British warships during the war of 1900–1902 and in 1901 HMS Sybille was wrecked opposite Steenbokfontein.

The first crayfish factory was started by Mr Lindström in 1918.

== See also ==
- Mussel Point, a prehistoric shell midden near Lambert's Bay
