= Point Danger (Portland, Victoria) =

Coordinates: 38°23′35″S 141°38′58″E

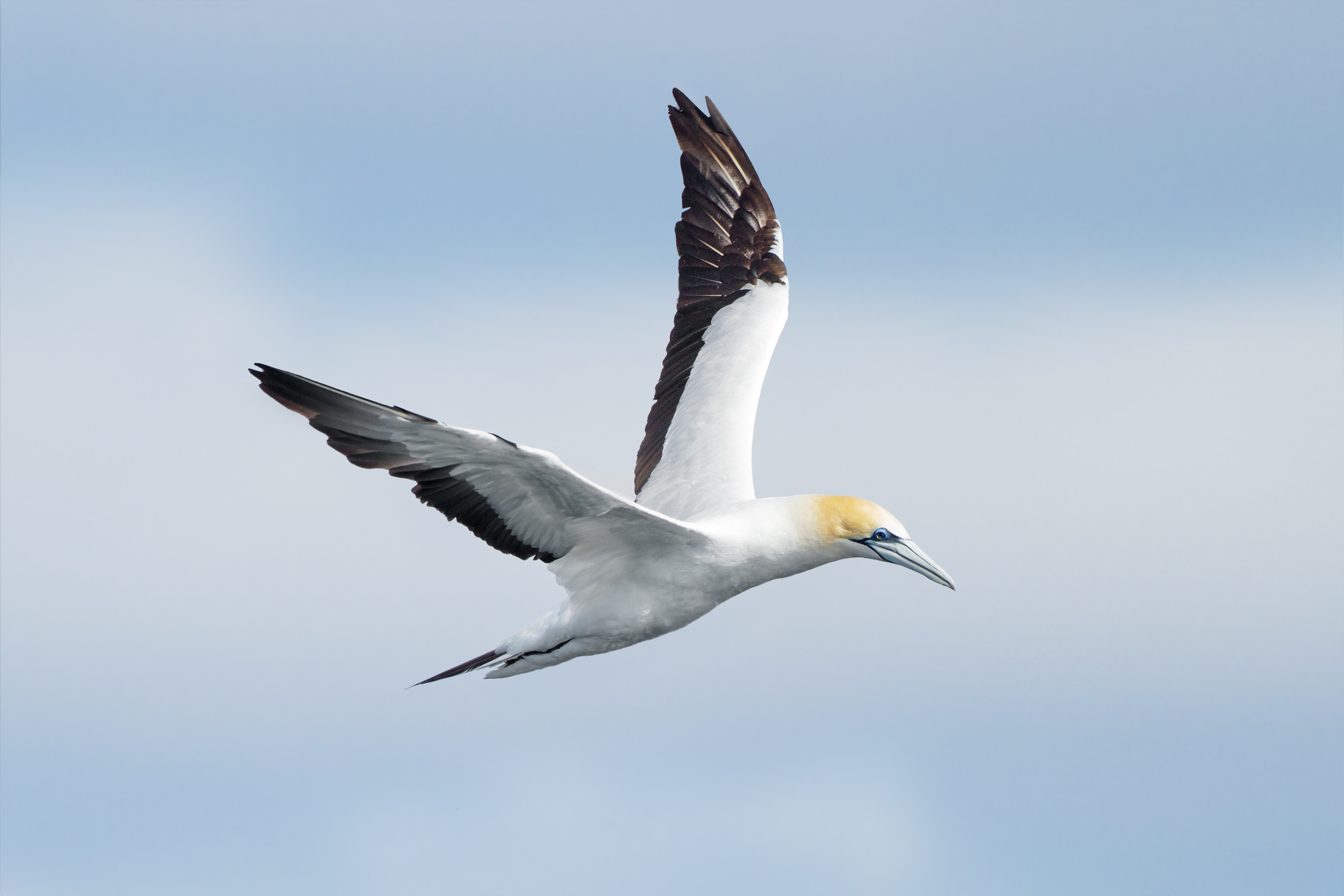
Australasian gannet

Point Danger is a headland on the coast of south-western Victoria, Australia. It lies at the western end of Portland Bay, on the northern side of Bass Strait, about 6 km south-south-east of the city of Portland. Cape Nelson lies 2.5 km to the south-west and the Lawrence Rocks 2 km to the south-east.

== Gannet colony ==
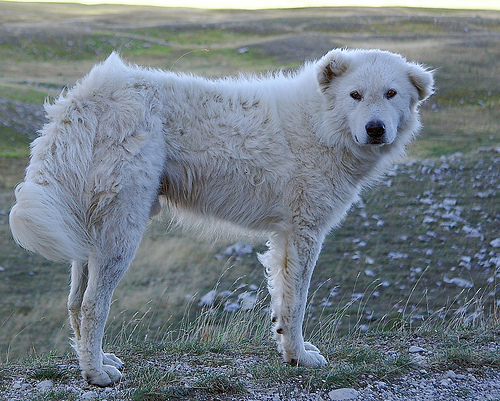
Maremma Sheepdog

Point Danger is home to a colony of Australasian gannets, largely a result of spillover from the nearby Lawrence Rocks colony exceeding its capacity. Established in October 1996, it is Australia's only mainland gannet colony; all others are on islands. However, in the first year of its existence no chicks were produced because of human disturbance and predation by foxes and feral cats. The gannets have subsequently been protected by an electric fence to exclude foxes, limiting public access to a viewing site overlooking the colony and by the presence of two Maremma Sheepdogs to deter predators. Colony size has grown to about 3000 birds.
