= Moriarty Rocks =

Island in Tasmania, Australia

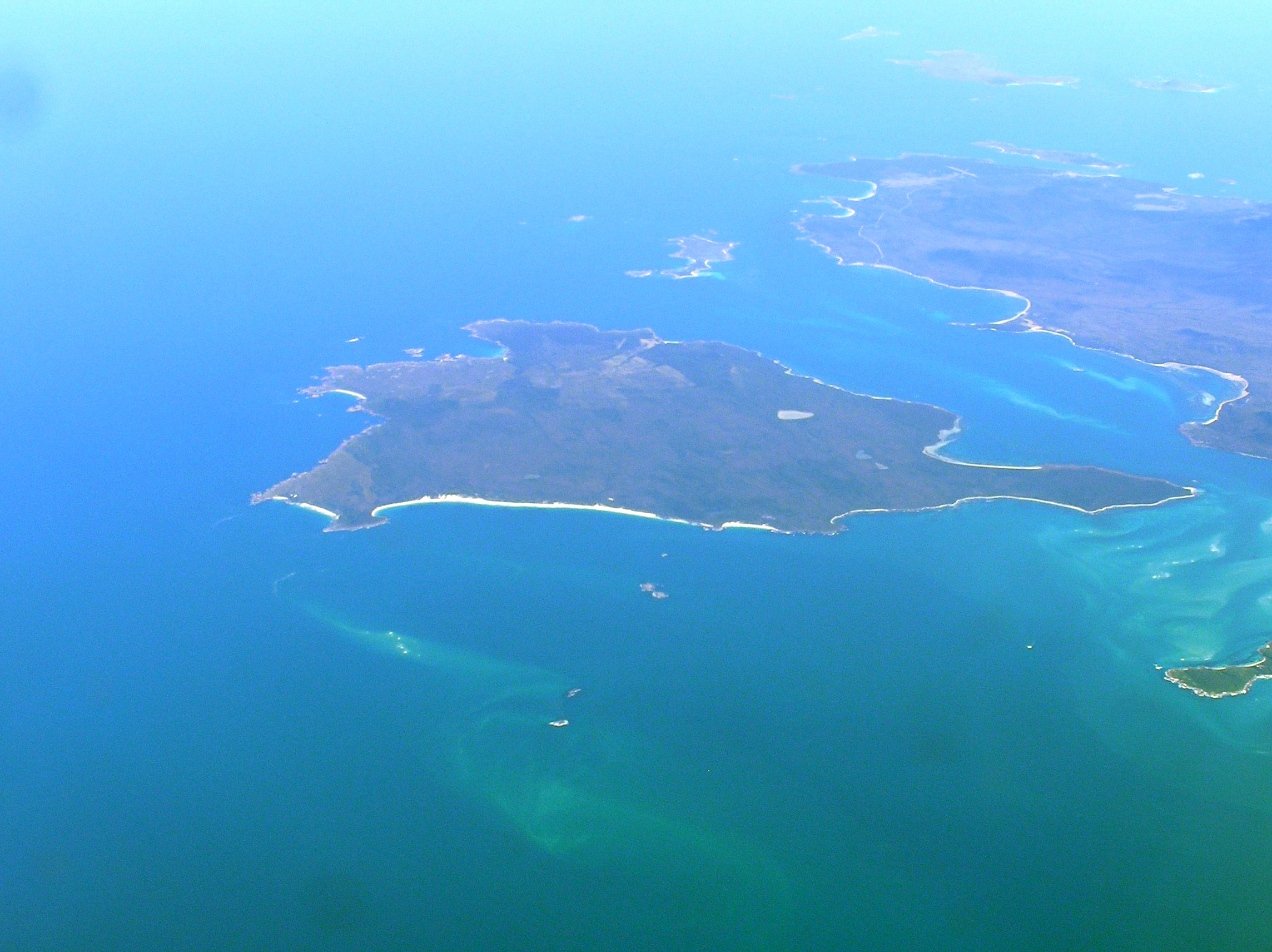
- An aerial view of Clarke Island, centre; with the Moriarty Rocks at the bottom of the picture.

- Location within Tasmania

Geography
- Location: Bass Strait
- Coordinates: 40°34′48″S 148°16′12″E
- Archipelago: Passage Group, part of the Furneaux Group
- Total islands: 2
- Area: 2.46 ha (6.1 acres)

Administration
- Australia
- State: Tasmania

The Moriarty Rocks, part of the Passage Group within the Furneaux Group, are a group of two major unpopulated granite rocks, and several smaller ones, with a combined area of 2.46 hectares (6.1 acres), located in Bass Strait, south of Cape Barren Island, west of the Low Islets, and west of the Spike and Clarke islands, in Tasmania, in south-eastern Australia. The rocks are contained within a nature reserve.

== History ==
Sealing is reported to have taken on the rocks in December 1830.

== Flora and fauna ==
There is little vegetation on the rocks, due to them being frequently wave-washed. black-faced cormorants breed there, and they hold an important breeding colony of Australian fur seals, with up to about 1000 pups being born there annually.

== See also ==
- List of islands of Tasmania
