= Low Islets (Tasmania) =

Islands in Tasmania, Australia

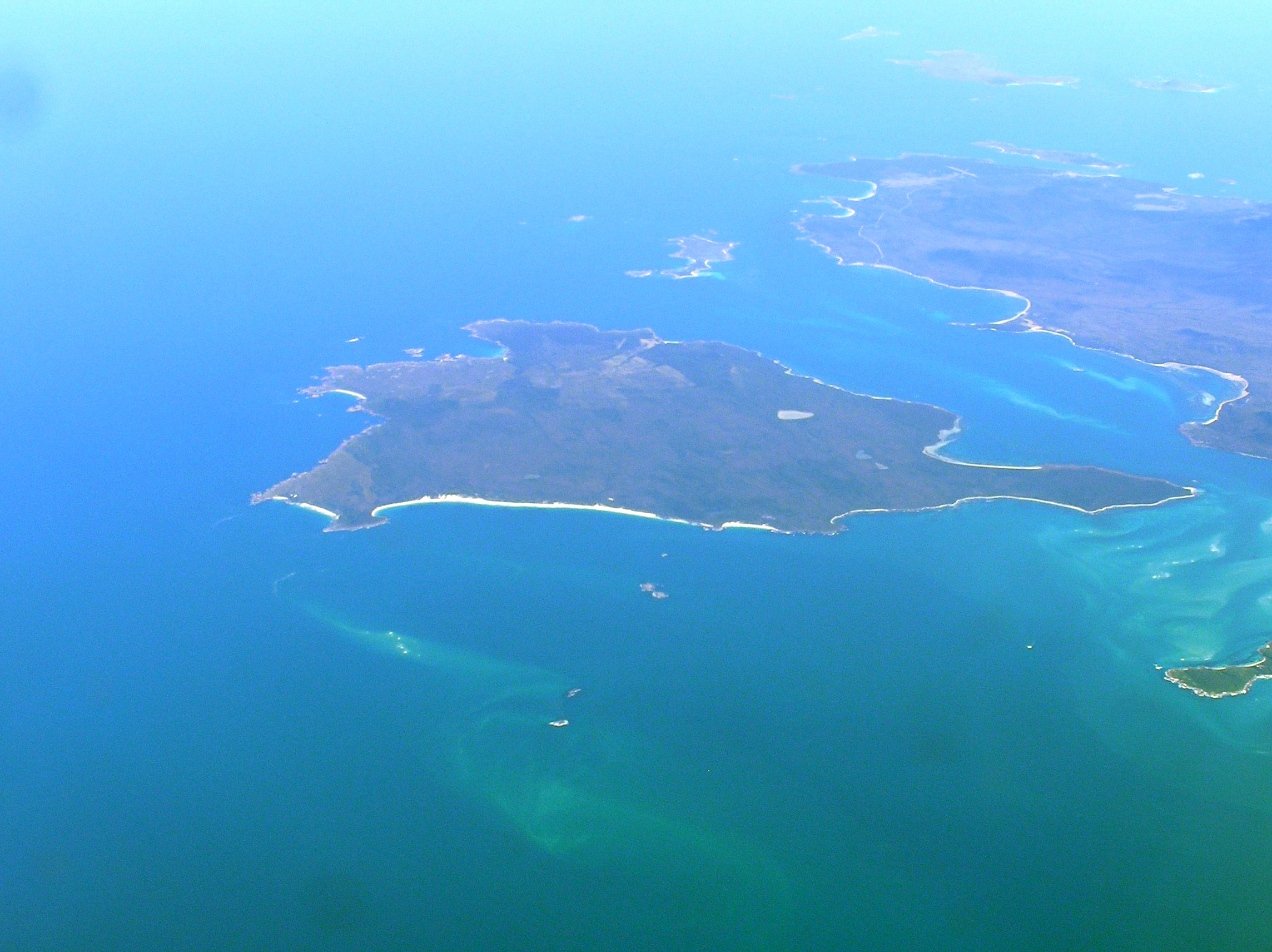
- An aerial view of Clarke Island, centre; with the Low Islets being two small islands in foreground; with Spike Island closer to Clarke Island.

- Location within Tasmania

Geography
- Location: Bass Strait
- Coordinates: 40°33′36″S 148°14′24″E
- Archipelago: Passage Group, part of the Furneaux Group
- Total islands: 2
- Area: 2 ha (4.9 acres)

Administration
- Australia
- State: Tasmania

The Low Islets, part of the Passage Group within the Furneaux Group, is a close pair of unpopulated small granite islands with a combined area of 2 hectares (4.9 acres), located in Bass Strait, south of Cape Barren Island, and west of both Spike and Clarke islands, in Tasmania, in south-eastern Australia.

== Fauna ==
The island is one of only three sites where pelicans breed in Tasmania. Recorded breeding seabird, wader and waterbird species include little penguin, Pacific gull, silver gull, sooty oystercatcher, black-faced cormorant, Australian pelican, Caspian tern, crested tern and white-fronted tern.

== See also ==
- List of islands of Tasmania
