= Clarke Island (Tasmania) =

Island in Tasmania, Australia

Lungatalanana/Clarke Island
Native name: Lungtalanana
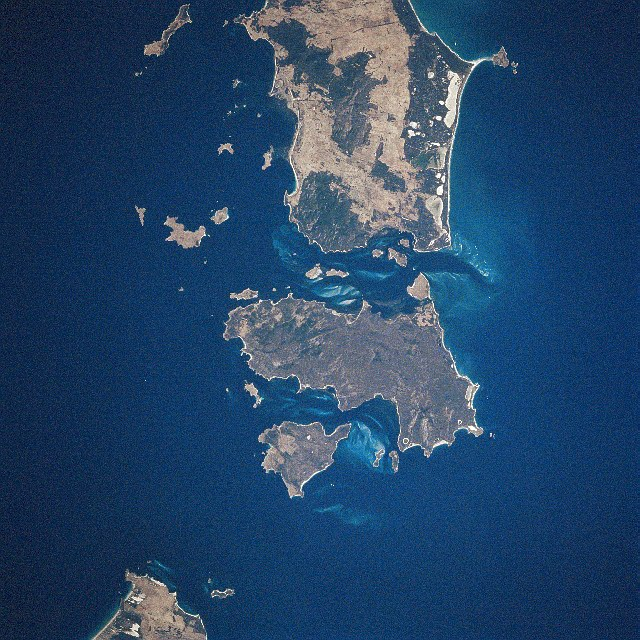
- Lying below Flinders Island and Cape Barren Island is Clarke Island. The land mass at the bottom left corner is Tasmania.

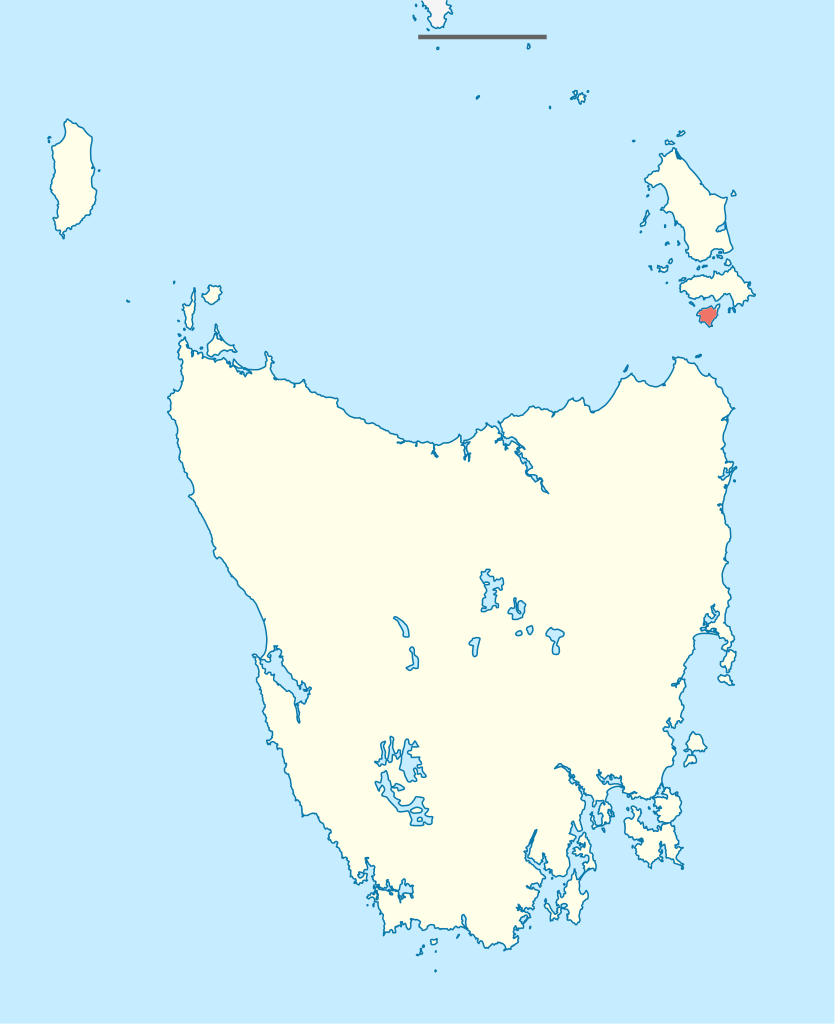
- Clarke Island (Tasmania)

Geography
- Location: Bass Strait
- Coordinates: 40.535°S 148.170°E
- Archipelago: Furneaux Group
- Area: 82 km^{2} (32 sq mi)
- Area rank: 8th in Tasmania
- Highest elevation: 206 m (676 ft)

Administration
- Australia
- State: Tasmania

The Clarke Island, also known by its Indigenous name of Lungtalanana (from the palawa kani language), part of the Furneaux Group, is an 82-square-kilometre (32 sq mi) island in Bass Strait, south of Cape Barren Island (palawa kani: Truwana), about 24 kilometres (15 mi) off the northeast coast of Tasmania, Australia. Banks Strait separates the island from Cape Portland on the mainland. Clarke Island is the third-largest island in the Furneaux Group, and Tasmania's eighth largest island.

Off its west coast lies the shipwreck of HMS Litherland, which sank in 1853 and was discovered in 1983.

== History ==
=== Early occupation ===
Clarke Island is known to Aboriginal Tasmanians as Lungtalanana. Aboriginal peoples occupied and used the land while it was still connected to the mainland, before the Last Glacial Period, and it is estimated that the island was occupied until around 6,500 years ago. There are many archaeological sites on the island, showing evidence of Aboriginal occupation and land use over a long period. When sea levels rose and Lungtalanana became an island, occupation ceased and Aboriginal people did not occupy the island again until they were taken there by sealers in 1810. They then lived mainly in huts around the area now known as Spike Bay.

=== Shipwreck (1797) ===
Sydney Cove ran aground between Preservation Island and Rum Island on 28 February 1797. A party of seventeen men set off on 28 February 1787 in the ship's longboat to reach help at Port Jackson, 400 nautical miles (740 km) away. This was led by first mate Hugh Thompson, and included William Clark the supercargo, three European seamen and twelve lascars. Ill fortune struck again and they were wrecked on the mainland at the northern end of Ninety Mile Beach. Their only hope was to walk along the shore all the way to Sydney, a distance of over 600 kilometres (370 miles).

They had few provisions and no ammunition, and fatigue and hunger lessened their number as they marched. Along the way they encountered various Aboriginal Tasmanians, some friendly and some not. The last of the party to die on the march was killed by a man Dilba and his people near Hat Hill. Those people had a reputation around Port Jackson for being ferocious. Matthew Flinders and George Bass had feared for their safety when they encountered Dilba the previous year.

In May 1797 the three survivors of the march, William Clark, sailor John Bennet and one lascar had made it to the cove at Wattamolla and, on 15 May 1797, with their strength nearly at an end they were able to signal a boat out fishing, which took them on to Sydney.

On the march Clark had noted coal in the cliffs at what is now called Coalcliff between Sydney and Wollongong. This was the first coal found in Australia. On arrival at Port Jackson, the men informed Governor Hunter of the Sydney Cove and its remaining crew. Hunter despatched the Francis and the Eliza to salvage the ship and take the remaining crew and cargo to Port Jackson.

On the first salvage trip, the crew of the Francis discovered wombats on the island and a live animal was taken back to Port Jackson. Matthew Flinders, travelling on board the Francis on its third and final salvage trip, also decided to take a wombat specimen from the island to Port Jackson. Governor Hunter later sent the animal's corpse to Joseph Banks at the Literary and Philosophical Society to verify it as a new species. Flinders also spotted many fur seals on the island in 1798.

The island was named Clarke island after William Clark.

=== Shipwreck (1853) ===
HMS Litherland sank off the coast of the island in 1853, and was discovered in 1983. Clarke Island is Tasmania's eighth largest island.

=== Later use ===
Sealing took place on the island from 1810 until 1837. From 1843 onwards, grazing livestock was introduced to the island in the form of sheep and cattle. European use of the island brought feral animals, weeds, and plant diseases.

By the 1980s, there were feral horses and cattle, but no permanent human population. The wildlife is documented in autobiographical tale by writer Dion Perry, who documents his family's residence in a crumbling farmhouse on Clarke Island for 6 years between 1984 and 1990. He went there as a child, and says his family were the only residents. The family had minimal financial resources, and lived a semi-subsistence lifestyle, tending goats, and living from a garden and the sea.

In 2009, Clarke Island had one permanent resident, while small groups of up to eight people visited for youth and corporate programmes. Infrastructure was limited and ageing. The main settlement is in the northwest corner, consisting of several buildings (4 remaining in 2023), the wharf, and an airstrip suitable for Light aircraft. In 2009, a hybrid stand-alone power system to generate electricity using 2kW solar and 1kW wind energy was installed to replace the old diesel generator, which cost around A$35,000 per year to run.

=== Handback ===
In 1995, the Aboriginal Land Council of Tasmania bought a large area of land on the island under a lease agreement.

Two years later in 1997, Aboriginal people were given some control over Clarke Island, which became known by them as Lungtalanana. The word derives from an Aboriginal woman called Tanalipunya, who had been married to Manalakina before being taken to the Bass Strait Island (Tayaritja) by white sealers. Her skills were vital in helping the sealers survive the harsh conditions. During this time, the island was used for running youth justice programs as an alternative to imprisonment for young Aboriginal offenders, and some families lived on the island to administer the programs while they were running.

On 10 May 2005, after the passing of the Aboriginal Lands Amendment Act 2004, the government released Crown lands on both Cape Barren and Clarke Islands to be overseen by the Aboriginal Land Council of Tasmania. This marked the first official handover of Crown land to an Aboriginal community in Tasmania.

In 2009, the island was designated an Indigenous Protected Area (IPA).

== Location and geography ==
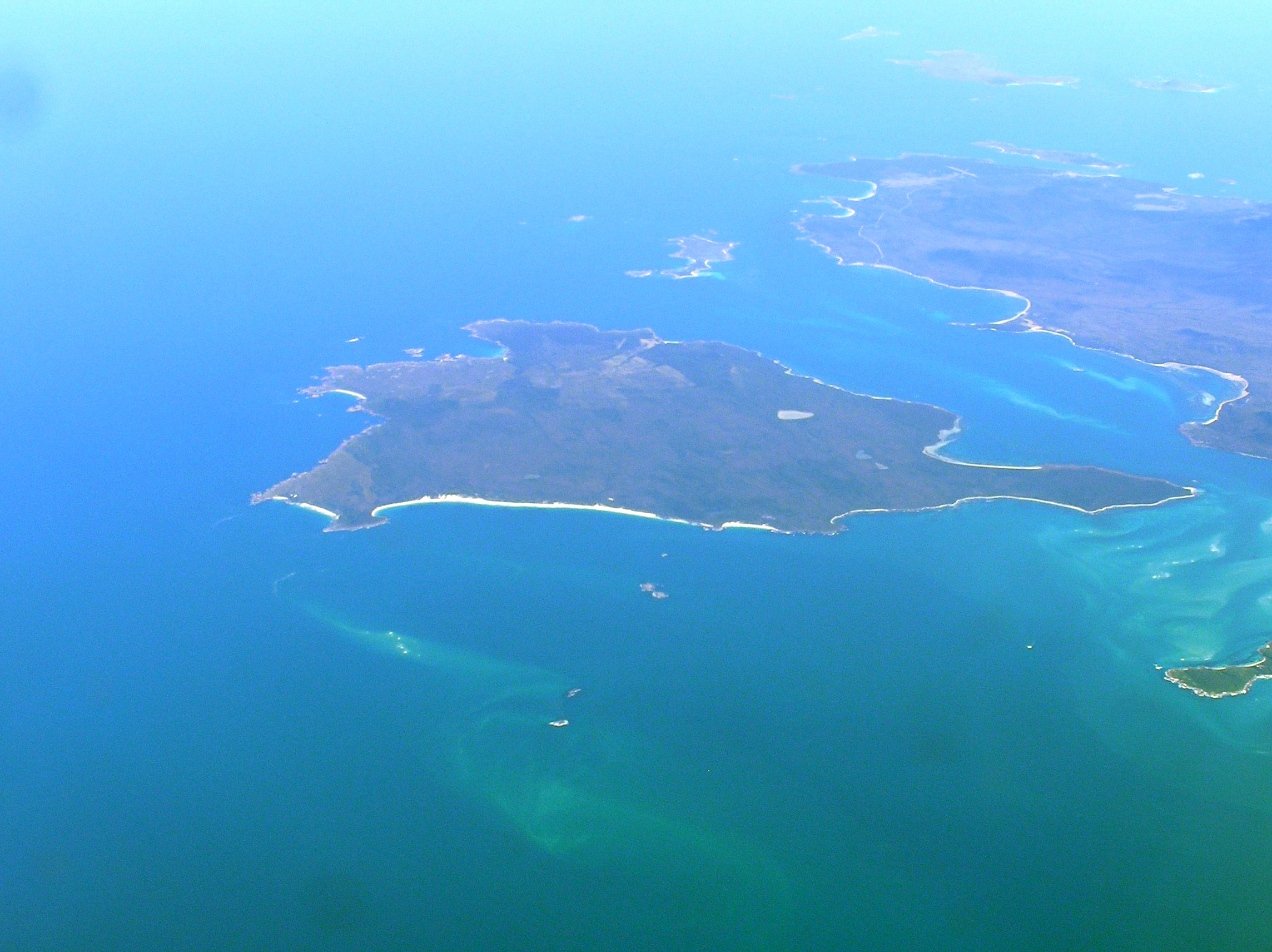
Aerial view of Clarke Island from southeast

Clarke Island is part of the Furneaux Group, is an 82-square-kilometre (32 sq mi) island in Bass Strait, south of Cape Barren Island, about 24 kilometres (15 mi) off the northeast coast of Tasmania, Australia. Banks Strait separates the island from Cape Portland on the mainland.

Clarke Island is Tasmania's eighth largest island, and the third largest in the Furneaux Group.

=== Topography ===
A prominent feature of Clarke Island is a central plateau that rises 110 metres (350 ft). This inland highland provides a limited water catchment from which water flows directly to the sea. The highest elevation point is 206 metres (676 ft), located on a northwestern point of the island. There are three prominent hills: Blue Hills to the east, Green Hill in the southwest, Steep Hill in the northwest. There are wetlands along the coastline, which consists of rocky outcrops with white beaches between them. On the eastern shore of the island is a string of white beaches.

== Ecology, flora and fauna ==
In the early 1800s Clarke Island was heavily wooded with eucalypts and sheoak (limuna), the latter growing in a belt close to the shore. Extensive damage was caused to the native vegetation after the island was used for grazing around 4000 sheep, during which time no cultural burning took place, leading to a number of damaging bushfires. Grazing stopped in 2005 after custodianship of the island was handed back to the local Aboriginal people, but the damage persists into the 2020s, with pastures only slowly being regenerated. A large fire in 2014 burnt about 98% of the island's vegetation.

The Xanthorrhoea australis (yamina, or "black boy") forest on the island has been identified as being part of an important ecosystem. There is a forest of very old yamina on the northern part of the island, behind Kangaroo Bay. These are important to the community, as the leaves can be used for weaving. They are very slow-growing and have been of concern after so many were burnt in the 2014 fire, but they recover well after fire.

A 2014 survey, done eight months after the fire, found that most species of plant were regenerating well, but were vulnerable to further fires or drought. It also found evidence of eight species of terrestrial mammal on Island, six of which had been introduced; only two native species were recorded, and noted as representing only 20 per cent of previously recorded native mammal fauna.

The island contains the only Tasmanian breeding ground of the Australian pelican, and islets around Seal Point provide important habitat for the threatened white-fronted tern.

=== Threats ===
Introduced animals still inhabiting the island include rabbits, cats and rats. The cats were probably responsible for rendering the remaining small native mammals locally extinct.

The root fungus pathogen, Phytophthora cinnamomi, known to be able to kill Australian native plants, was found in the island in an isolated case, in 2002. This disease, which rots the roots of plants, has since spread, and by 2015 was of some concern, especially the threat to the yamina forest, although it had not spread to the nearby islands. It can be carried by contaminated dirt on machinery or clothing.

=== Conservation measures ===
Reports are regularly published, and plans are in place to keep the ecosystems healthy. The Aboriginal Land Council of Tasmania provides advice for ongoing management strategies to control noxious weeds and diseases, as well as the preservation of threatened plant species.

In January 2023, a project to remove the feral cats to protect a colony of vulnerable white-fronted terns (Sterna striata) nesting on the island began. Its status as an IPA qualifies the area for some funding from DCCEEW and from the National Indigenous Australians Agency. However, this is not enough to cover elimination of the feral cats; it is mostly earmarked for employment and training of Indigenous rangers to manage Country. A$350,000 has been committed to the island by WWF-Australia, but this is for rewilding rather than cat eradication.

A project involving the translocation of several species, starting with Bass Strait wombats from Flinders Island, and Maria Island, is planned to begin in mid-2025. It is hoped that Bennetts wallabies and long-nosed potoroos will be next, once the cat population has been brought under control and the wombats have created burrows, which serve to cool the earth and provide shelter for smaller species.

== See also ==
- List of islands of Tasmania
