= Preservation Islets =

Coordinates: 40°29′S 148°03′E

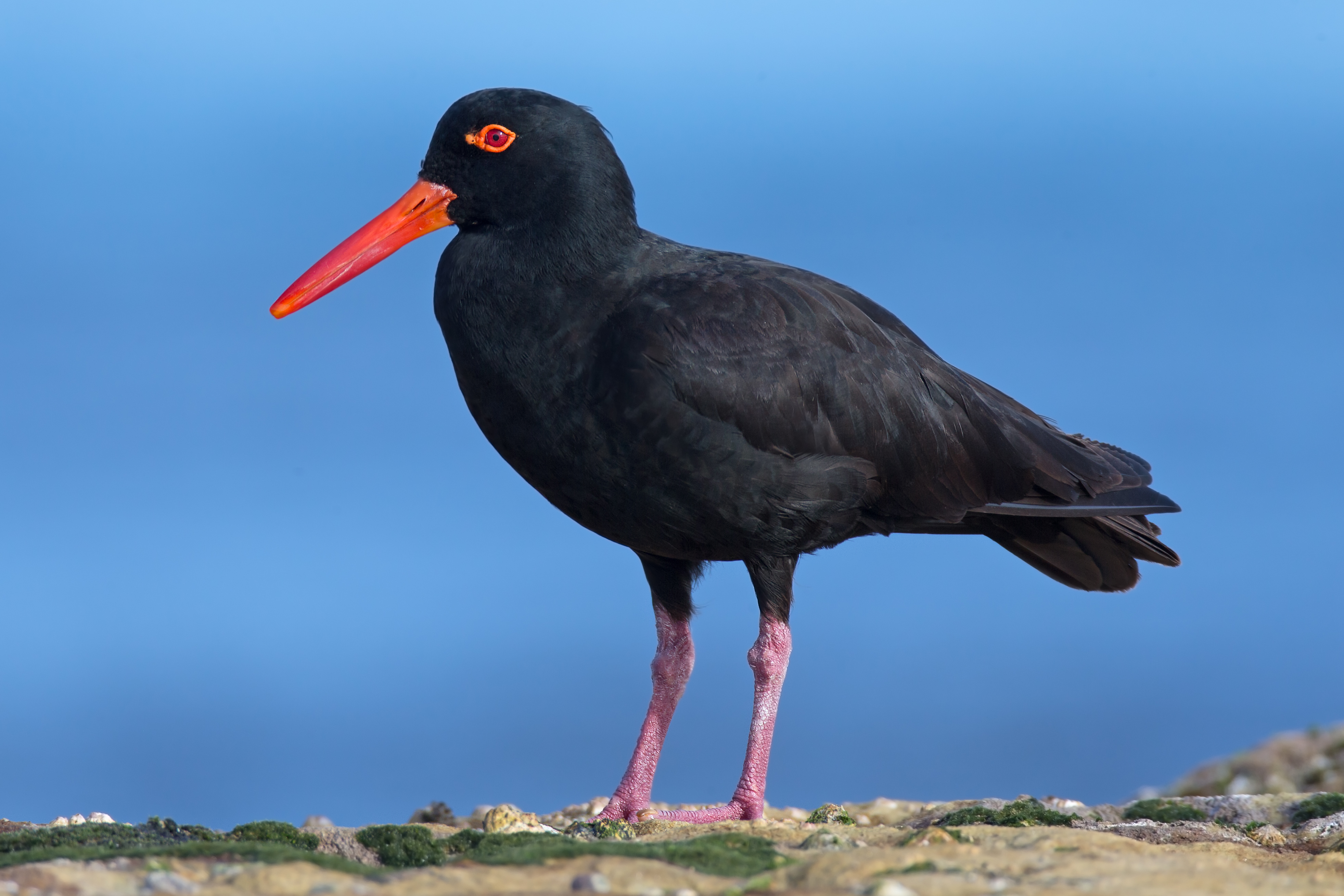
Sooty oystercatchers breed on the islets

The Preservation Islets are a close group of small granite islands, with a combined area of 0.93 ha, just north-west of Preservation Island in south-eastern Australia. They are part of Tasmania’s Preservation Island Group, lying in eastern Bass Strait south-west of Cape Barren Island in the Furneaux Group.

== Fauna ==
Recorded breeding seabird and wader species include little penguin, Pacific gull and sooty oystercatcher.

Other islands in the Preservation Group with breeding seabirds include:

- Night Island
- Preservation Island
- Rum Island
