= Night Island =

Night Island may refer to:

- Night Island (Queensland), Great Barrier Reef Marine Park west of Cape Melville, Queensland, Australia
- Night Island (Tasmania), Preservation Island Group, Tasmania, Australia
