= Battery Island =

Island in Tasmania, Australia

- Location within Tasmania

Geography
- Location: Bass Strait
- Coordinates: 40°27′00″S 148°10′12″E
- Archipelago: Passage Group, part of the Furneaux Group
- Area: 2 ha (4.9 acres)
- Length: 100 m (300 ft)
- Width: 20 m (70 ft)

Administration
- Australia
- State: Tasmania

The Battery Island, part of the Passage Group within the Furneaux Group, is a 2-hectare (4.9-acre) granite island, located in Bass Strait south of Cape Barren Island, in Tasmania, in south-eastern Australia.

== Fauna ==
Recorded breeding seabird and wader species include little penguin, Pacific gull, silver gull, sooty oystercatcher and Caspian tern.

== See also ==
- List of islands of Tasmania
