= Gull Island (Tasmania) =

Island in Tasmania, Australia

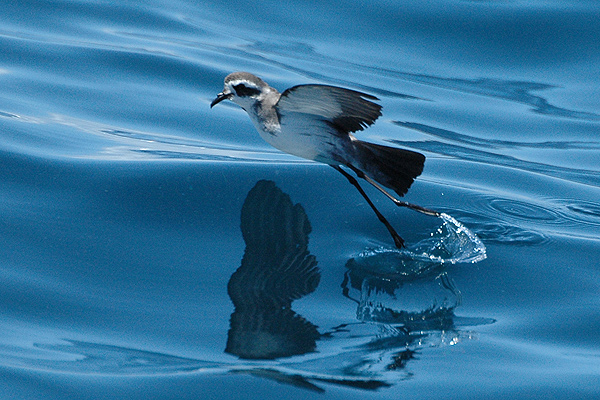
- White-faced storm-petrels breed on the Gull Island.

- Location within Tasmania

Geography
- Location: Bass Strait
- Coordinates: 40°25′48″S 148°29′24″E
- Archipelago: Passage Group, part of the Furneaux Group
- Area: 8.5 ha (21 acres)

Administration
- Australia
- State: Tasmania

The Gull Island, part of the Passage Group within the Furneaux Group, is an 8.5-hectare (21-acre) granite island, located in Bass Strait southeast of Cape Barren Island, in Tasmania, in south-eastern Australia. The island is a conservation reserve and with the Passage and Forsyth islands, the Gull Island forms part of the Forsyth, Passage and Gull Islands Important Bird Area (IBA), identified as such by BirdLife International because it supports over 1% of the world populations of little penguins and black-faced cormorants.

== Fauna ==
Recorded breeding seabird and wader species include little penguin, short-tailed shearwater, white-faced storm-petrel, Pacific gull, silver gull, sooty oystercatcher and crested tern.

== See also ==
- List of islands of Tasmania
