= ST Koraaga =

Australian naval vessel

Coordinates: 34.783268°S 150.909879°E

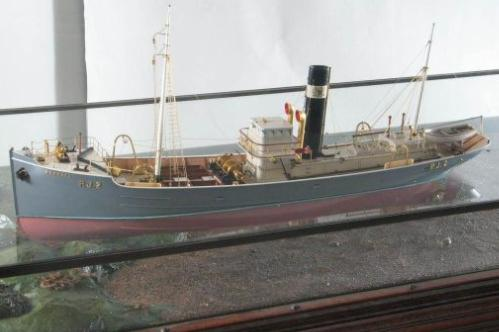
- Model of the Koraaga from the Powerhouse Museum

History

Australia
- Name: Koraaga
- Owner: New South Wales Government Fisheries, Sydney; Coastal Trawling Company, Sydney; Cam & Sons, Sydney
- Port of registry: Sydney registration number: 26/1923
- Builder: Smith's Dock Company Middlesbrough, England
- Yard number: 594
- Launched: 3 December 1914
- Completed: January 1915
- Identification: UK official number: 151981
- Fate: Wrecked and sank striking reef on 10 September 1931

Australia
- Name: Koraaga
- In service: 8 October 1917
- Out of service: February 1918
- Fate: Returned to owners in 1918

General characteristics
- Type: Castle-class naval trawler
- Tonnage: 221 GRT; 80 NRT
- Length: 34.93 m (114 ft 7 in)
- Beam: 6.644 m (21 ft 9.6 in)
- Draught: 3.596 m (11 ft 9.6 in)
- Installed power: Triple expansion steam engine
- Crew: 11

Koraaga was a Castle-class steel-hulled trawler built in 1914 by Smith's Dock Company, South Bank, Middlesbrough. She was requisitioned as an auxiliary minesweeper operated by the Royal Australian Navy (RAN) in October 1917 for minesweeping duties during World War I, but she was never commissioned. Koraaga returned to be operated commercially as a fishing trawler until she wrecked when she struck a reef off Bass Point whilst carrying returning to Sydney. She was refloated on the tide after having becoming stranded and drifted till she was finally lost five miles (8.0 km) east of Black Head, Gerringong on 10 September 1931.

== Ship description and construction ==
The vessels were designed with a single deck with a long, raised quarterdeck carried to the fore side of the trawl winch and also a raised top-gallant forecastle. On the forecastle deck a windlass for working the winch was fitted, and an anchor of the stockless type housed in a long hawse pipe. An iron breakwater was also fitted to divert the sea when the vessels are being driven in heavy weather. The crew was housed under the forecastle deck, the entrance being through a lobby on the starboard side over which the forecastle deck was carried affording ample protection to the crew when entering or leaving the forecastle in heavy weather.

The vessel was described by one of the crew:

They were pretty good sea boats, although very wet, there was a saying that they submerged at the Heads and surfaced down at Gabo Island. We worked mainly four on, four off. Turn to, to 'shoot away', pick up and store the catch and clean up. We worked bloody long hours. I think there were six deckies, four firemen, one engineer, one wireless operator and the master and mate. The galley was right aft with the mess room beneath. You would get your feed, climb down the hatchway to the mess room below. We would get a bucket of water from the galley to take to the forecastle where we bunked. By the time we got forward we would have only half a bucket of hot water to wash in but after a couple of days you didn’t worry about washing. You were wet through most of the time so it didn’t matter.

== Ship service history ==
=== New South Wales state service ===
Government trawlers Brolga, Koraaga, and Gunundaal left for Sydney on 17 February 1915, came out via the Suez Canal, and had an uneventful trip with the only bad weather being in the Australian Bight. Captain D. Rousfield brought the vessel out and thought highly of her sea-going capabilities.

==== Reasoning for the State trawling vessels ====
From the late 1890s, the State Government had been investigating the possibility of a deepwater fishery off New South Wales. Prior to World War I estuary based fishing dominated the New South Wales catch.

In 1914 the Holman State Government set up a publicly owned company called the State Trawling Industry to encourage the development of off-shore fishing and to supply Sydney and Newcastle with large quantities of cheap fish. The Manager, David Stead was sent to Great Britain to examine steam trawling methods and acquire the necessary ships and crews.

Steam trawler Brolga arrived in Sydney on 24 April 1915, followed a few days later by Koraaga arriving 27 April and the following month by Gunundaal.

Trawling operations began in June 1915. In 1916 the Government expanded its fishing operations and placed an order for three more trawlers with the State Dockyard in Newcastle. The Government also established an integrated fishing and marketing system, with the new company opening four retail outlets in Sydney by 1916. By 1922 this network had grown to 20 outlets, 14 of which were in the Sydney area

By 1920 due to consistently large financial losses arising from State Trawling Industry operations, management was replaced and a major cost-cutting program was begun. In 1923 the Fuller Government sold off the operation which had a running loss of over £180,000. The steam trawlers were sold to private companies.

==== Union and social issues ====
Cabled advice was recently received from London announcing the departure of three trawlers, which were purchased by Mr. David G. Stead for the New South Wales Government. The three vessels – the Brolga, the Gunundaal, and the Koraaga – will form the nucleus of a State fleet, and they are manned by. Grimsby men, who have been engaged by the State Government to teach trawling. The coastal fishing industry has until now been carried on by small sailing craft and motor-boats.

Industrial issues ensued from when the vessels arrived by 1916. An award had been secured to allow 24-hour leave periods for trawling crews. Between October 1921 and August 1922, trawler skippers were ordered to land no more than twenty boxes of fish other than flathead, when flathead were plentiful as a directed scheme to keep trawled flathead lower priced than so-called prime fish (estuarine mullet, for instance) so that it "could be attractive to the lower classes".

==== Shipping incidents ====
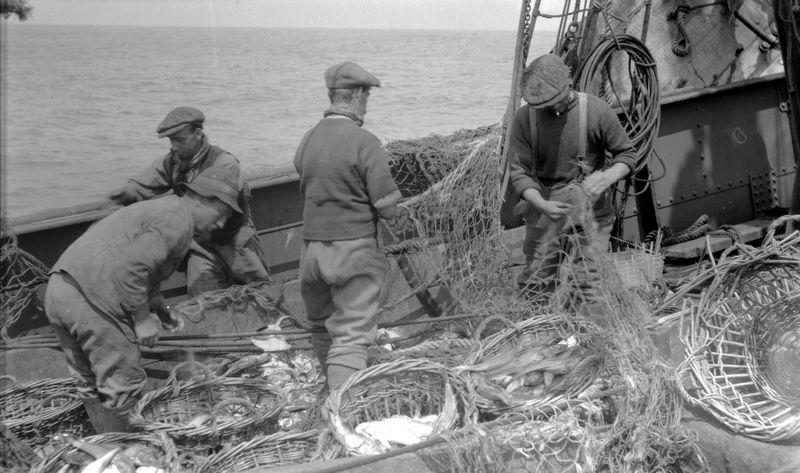
Repairing nets on the Koraaga while operated by the State Trawling Industry

The Government trawlers Koraaga and Gunundaal had a collision on the night of Monday, 14 February 1916. The Gunundaal, when coming alongside No 5 wharf Woolloomooloo Bay collided with the Koraaga. The Gunundaal had her stem twisted towards the starboard quarter and the Koraagahad her starboard side abreast of the refrigeration hatch damaged. The damage to both vessels was estimated at £600 with the Gunundaal having to be repaired before she could go to sea again.

On Monday 16 July 1917 the Koraaga found the Swift, an 86 ft (26 m) motor launch, which was drifting between three and four miles east of Botany Bay, as her engine had broken and it was brought into Sydney.

==== Royal Australian Navy service ====
On 26 September 1917 the trawlers Gunundaal and Koraagawere requisitioned by the RAN as auxiliary minesweepers to conduct minesweeping operations off the New South Wales and Victoria coasts, searching for mines laid by the German raider Wolf.

On 8 October 1917 the trawlers Koraagaand Gunundaal, manned by the Royal Australian Naval Brigade under Lieutenant-Commander F. J. Ranken, RNR, began to sweep a German minefield off Gabo Island. Thirteen mines were destroyed. Minesweepers were not commissioned in the RAN in WWI. By early January 1918, they had swept a total of 13 mines. Koraaga was returned to her owners in February 1918, but her sister ships were retained until 1919.

==== Discoveries of old wreck sites ====
The State Trawling vessels become well known for the discovery of various wreck sites and artefacts as they were the first vessels to systematically trawl in deeper waters.

Two of the State trawling vessels have located wrecks during their trawling operations. On her last trip the Gunundaal let down her trawl about five miles off Botany South Head, and at 30 fathoms (55 m) struck an obstruction which proved to be a wreck. The trawling net suffered very severely and most of it was lost, but what was dragged out of depths brought with it a piece of angle steel about 30 feet (9.14 m) in length, with a spring about 9 inches (0.23 m) long attached to it. It evidently came off the decking of a vessel. The steel appeared to have been in the water a very long time, and was heavily oxidized, but the name, "Consett & Co.", a well-known firm of steel makers in Yorkshire, was discernible on it. On the same day and about the same locality the Koraaga at a depth of 50 fathoms (91 m) fouled something very substantial, and in her case to the trawl net was considerably damaged. It brought up with it a ship's boat davit.

The vessel fouled by the Gunundaal could well be the Woniora, built in April 1863, which sank on 28 October 1882, which is regularly dived in 63 meters of water. Although the boat davit brought up by the Koraagasuggests there may be a further wreck in deeper water.

The trawler Koraaga, which returned to port yesterday, after a successful fishing cruise on grounds reaching from off Botany to the vicinity of Coalcliff, located, 4 miles (6.44 km) east of Wattamolla, another wreck. On this occasion a large stock anchor very old and heavily corroded was picked up, with also pieces of wooden wreckage. The anchor or what remains of it weighs about 4 cwt or 5 cwt (200-250 kg).

This is prior to the sinking of the Undola (20 December 1918) or Tuggerah (17 May 1919) the only currently known wrecks in this approximate position. The vessel was also to trawl up remnants from World War I disasters.

At the War Trophies Exhibition in the education building is a remarkable exhibit. This is a bale of "greasy" wool picked up by the State trawler Koraaga in the vicinity of Green Cape at a depth of 300 feet (91.44 m). There is little doubt that this bale of wool is part of the cargo of the Cumberland, which was destroyed some time back after coming into contact with a German mine near Gabo Island. The wool is in good condition.

Again in the region of the Royal National Park near Wattamolla, the vessel ran into remains of vessels were discovered that were originally involved in the transport of Coal from the Illawarra region shortly after the sinking of the Undola (20 December 1918) but prior to the sinking of the Tuggerah (17 May 1919).

There is to be seen at the Government Tourist Bureau, in Martin Place, the old ship's anchor which was recently trawled by the Koraaga from the sea at a depth of 318 feet (96.93 m) off Wata Mooli. The anchor appears to have been in the sea for a very long period. A little distance on the landward side of the spot where the anchor was taken from the skipper of, the State trawler Brolga trawled a portion of a very old wreck.

Just 11 months later:

Captain Stuart, of the State trawler Brolga, has reported to his department that when fishing on the "Rome" grounds between Cape Solander and Wata Mooli on 26 January the trawl became fast to an old wreck. On hauling the trawl was half-full of old rotten timber, with pieces of metal attached, and also an old-fashioned anchor windlass lever on crusted with coal. Apparently this windlass lever was from a very old wreck, because the timber would crumble at the touch.

=== Coastal Trawling Company / Red Funnel Fisheries ===
In 1923 the fleet of State trawlers was disposed of to be taken over by private enterprise. The Koraaga, one of the seven trawlers offered for sale, was purchased by a syndicate, which is to work on a cooperative basis. All the crew of the Koraaga are men who served on the trawlers under the Government regime, and will be shareholders of the syndicate.

The move to the cooperative also encouraged changes to fishing practices including:

Unlike the system obtaining under State control, when hauls wore left on deck until all operations ended, the method adopted was to place each haul of fish straight into a separate ice-house, and, to prevent-crushing of the lower layers of fish, each ice-house is divided into sections by removable shelves. This system also obviates the use of grappling hooks, which formerly tore the flesh of the fish, and so made large quantities unsaleable. Under the new system loading into the baskets is affected by a simple inclination of the shelves. Mr. Creamer, general manager of the Coastal Trawling Company, which controls the Koraaga, pointed out yesterday that the reduction of handling to a minimum must ensured the good condition of all fish. The ‘Koraaga, moreover, should show a profit with even moderate catches. The weakness of the State trawling enterprise was, in his opinion, the large administrative and storage expenses. The Coastal Trawling Company has entirely eliminated the latter. Arrangements were made for the landing of fish at the markets in as fresh a condition as possible. Voyages were cut short; bonus systems were introduced, which made it worthwhile for the crews to see that no damage was done in the stowage or unloading of their hauls. Unnecessary handling was obviated by all discoverable devices.

Despite the accumulated losses of £300,000 suffered by the Stale trawling industry, private enterprise during the next seven or eight months has established the industry on a profitable and flourishing footing:

A representative of the original trawling syndicate that purchased the Koraaga said yesterday: "We started with everything against us. State administration had muddled every path we wanted to take. We were told that people would not eat trawled fish. We were told that trawled fish could not be landed fresh. We were told we should not make our running expenses. To-day we are doing everything that the State industry at tempted, and are making it pay. We have put the trawling industry firmly on its feet. We started off with no better equipment than the State, and with handicaps Imposed on us by the State., But throughout we had the advantages of business administration and of cleanliness. As for the profits to be made, take our own case. Our profits have long since repaid us the cost of our trawler. We have Just floated ourselves into a company, with a capital of £20,000. We are looking round now in Scotland for a second trawler. We have only begun to show the possibilities of the industry. There are further big developments to come."

=== Cam & Sons ===
The vessel came into the ownership of Cam & Sons a major player in the then-new growing industry in July 1929.

The trawler Koraaga continued to work hard but returned early to Sydney late on Wednesday 2 October 1929 with a broken foremast. As early on the Tuesday, morning, when the ship was 28 miles south of Cape Everard, the mast broke about 10 feet from the deck, under the strain of a trawl full of fish which was being hauled in. No one was injured.

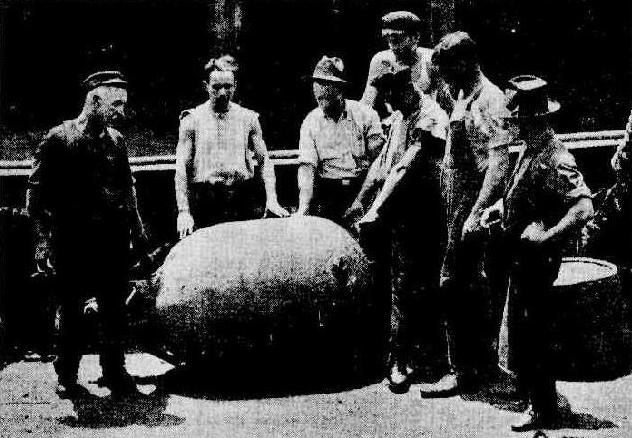
German Mine Laid by the Wolf Trawled up by the Koraaga

A few weeks later a German mine, apparently one of those laid in the track of shipping off Gabo Island by the raider Wolf in 1917, for which the vessel had previously been engaged in clearing was recovered by the Koraaga 14 miles east by south from Cape Everard on Thursday morning 24 October 1929.

After the trawl had been dragging for some time on the ocean bottom in 65 fathoms, it was raised and the crew stood by to receive the catch. Those with experience of mine sweeping during the war were startled when the mine tumbled out on deck. It stood about four feet high with a diameter of two feet and weighed about five cwt. Long immersion and rolling about on the ocean floor had made the mine harmless. The cap and firing mechanism were gone, and there was no cable. A quantity of explosive still remained. This was taken out and the mine brought back to Sydney where the trawler berthed yesterday morning. Any marks of identification are hidden by a heavy marine growth. Captain J. Farquhar, master of the Koraaga, who gained a knowledge of mines while fishing in the North Sea, said last night that he believed the mine had been cut adrift from a minefield during sweeping, and after going to the bottom was carried south by the current. It was possible, he said, that the Koraaga was responsible for rendering the mine harmless, since she swept the Gabo field with the Brolga and Gunundaal. The Gabo minefield was first discovered by one of the State trawlers, and that before the danger area was properly swept the Cumberland was blown up. "The laying of the mines by the Wolf was very cleverly done," he said. "They were put down at night in an area that was in full view of the Gabo lighthouse during daylight." The mine will be retained by Mr. Cam among the many curiosities that have been brought back to Sydney by his trawlers.

This mine made the total recovered number of mines in Australian waters as 27 and confirmed the statement made by the Germans after the war that the raider Wolf had put down two minefields, each of 15 mines, along the Australian coast. The site of the second minefield indicated by the Germans was off Cape Everard. This area was swept on two occasions without apparent result.

== Shipwreck event ==
The Koraaga struck a reef off Bass Point, Shellharbour late in the night of Wednesday 9 September 1931. By the morning of the Thursday the vessel had refloated with the tide and drifted away to the south and east slowly filling with water, until she sank in the afternoon five miles east of Black Head, Gerringong, Thursday 10 September 1931.

The vessel struck a reef off Bass Point, Shellharbour, late on Wednesday night, and was badly holed. As she appeared likely to founder quickly, she was abandoned, and the crew of 11 rowed to Kiama, five miles away. Returning to the scene early yesterday morning, they were astonished to find that the Incoming tide had refloated the vessel, which was rapidly drifting out to sea. The crew, in the ship's dinghy, reached Kiama at 2 o'clock yesterday morning, and Captain James Reid, the master, reported the matter to the police. The men rested until shortly before daybreak, and then set out in a launch owned by Mr. C. Stead to retrieve their personal belongings. As they drew near the spot where the Koraaga had gone ashore they found she had disappeared, and it was feared that she had already foundered. Within a few minutes, however, the vessel was seen about a mile and a half offshore, drifting southward under the influence of a strong current and a stiff north-easterly breeze. Her trawling flags were still flying, and she gave the appearance of being under control. So much so that, several hours later, two Interstate steamers passed without noticing anything amiss. By noon the trawler, now low in the water, was several miles out to sea. Members of the crew overtook the Koraaga early in the morning and went on board. They found that the engine room was flooded, and the vessel was being kept afloat by watertight compartments. There were then two possibilities, either that she would founder when the weight of water broke down the bulkheads, or that she would go ashore on Gerringong Beach. Word was sent to Sydney, and Cam and Sons, the owners, dispatched the trawler Charlie Cam, equipped with towing gear, to the scene. It was hoped to reach her before she went ashore or sank, and that she would have sufficient buoyancy to enable her to be towed to Sydney. She disappeared, however, before the Charlie Cam had reached the scene, and the salvage trawler was recalled. Worn out by his all day vigil beside the sinking vessel, Captain Reid returned to Kiama at 4 o'clock. He reported that the trawler had heeled over and foundered an hour before, about five miles east of Black Head, Gerringong, 9 miles from Kiama. Captain Reid was on board until just before the foundering. He said that the Koraaga sank in two minutes. The trawling flags and signals were still flying when she disappeared.

== Wreck site and wreckage ==
The wreck site is described as "about five miles east of Black Head, Gerringong, 9 miles from Kiama" and at 70 metres (230 ft) depth.
