= Mount Munro =

Mountain in Tasmania, Australia

Coordinates: 40.3698°S 148.1173°E

Mount Munro is, at 715 metres, the highest point on Cape Barren Island in Bass Strait, Tasmania, Australia. It was probably named after James Munro (c1779-1845), a former convict who had been a sealer and beachcomber in Bass Strait from the early 1820s and lived for more than twenty years on nearby Preservation Island, where he had several "wives". Cape Barren Island is now an Aboriginal community island.
