= Forsyth Island =

Island in Tasmania, Australia

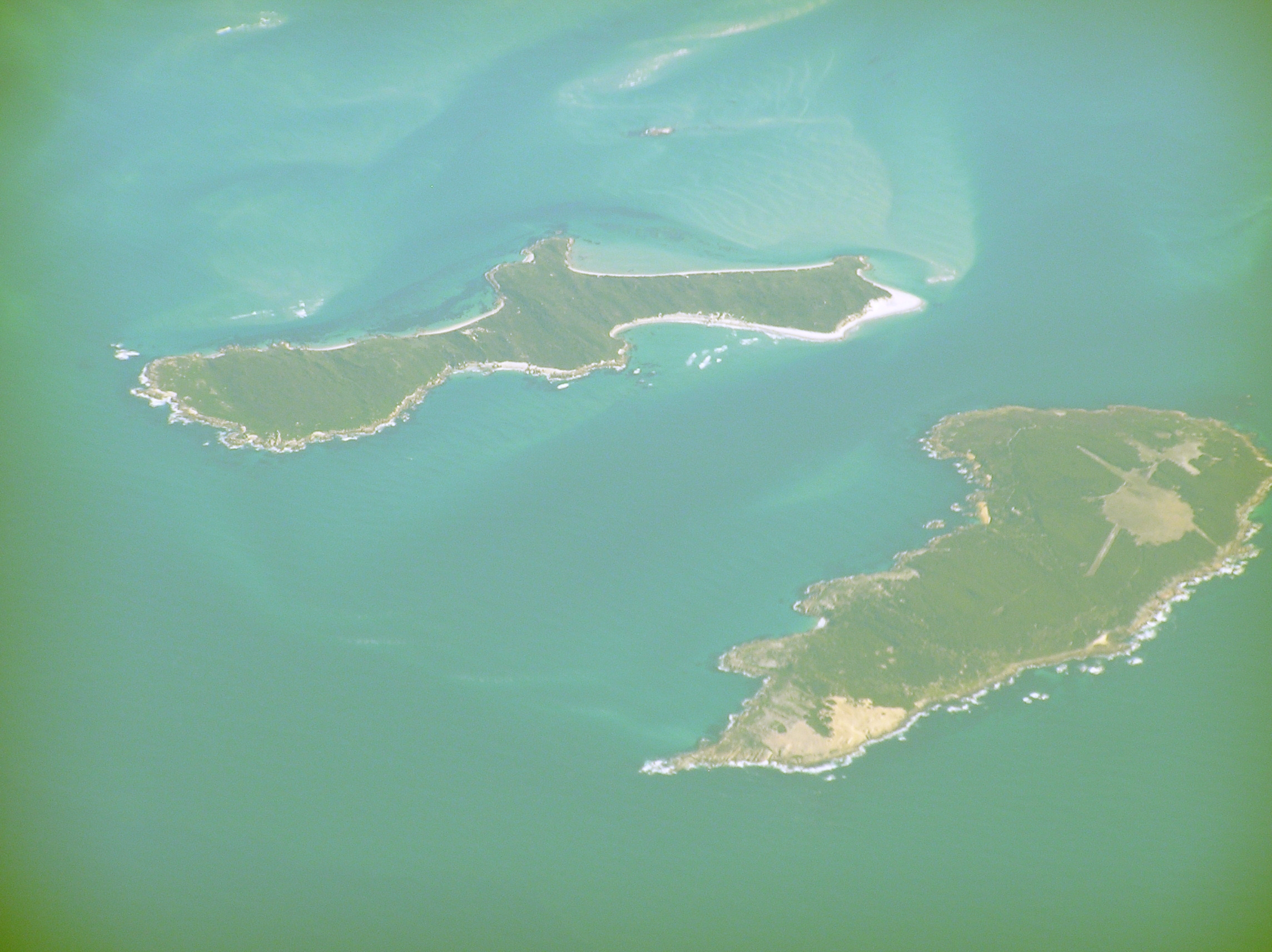
- Forsyth Island, pictured top left; with Passage Island, bottom right.

- Location within Tasmania

Geography
- Location: Bass Strait
- Coordinates: 40°27′00″S 148°10′12″E
- Archipelago: Passage Group, part of the Furneaux Group
- Area: 167 ha (410 acres)

Administration
- Australia
- State: Tasmania

The Forsyth Island, part of the Passage Group within the Furneaux Group, is a 167-hectare (410-acre) granite island, located in Bass Strait south of Cape Barren Island, in Tasmania, in south-eastern Australia. With the Passage and Gull islands, the Forsyth Island forms part of the Forsyth, Passage and Gull Islands Important Bird Area (IBA), identified as such by BirdLife International because it supports over 1% of the world populations of little penguins and black-faced cormorants.

== History ==
Matthew Flinders reported large numbers of fur seals on the island in 1798. Sealers came to the island, which they called Penguin Island, early in the 19th century. At least one was living there in December 1830, with a number of Aboriginal women, when Robinson paid a visit.

== Fauna ==
Recorded breeding seabird and wader species include little penguin (147,000 pairs), short-tailed shearwater, white-faced storm-petrel, Pacific gull and sooty oystercatcher. Recorded mammals are the swamp rat and a species of small mouse. Reptiles present include the eastern blue-tongued lizard and tiger snake.

== See also ==
- List of islands of Tasmania
