= Passage Island (Tasmania) =

Island in Tasmania, Australia

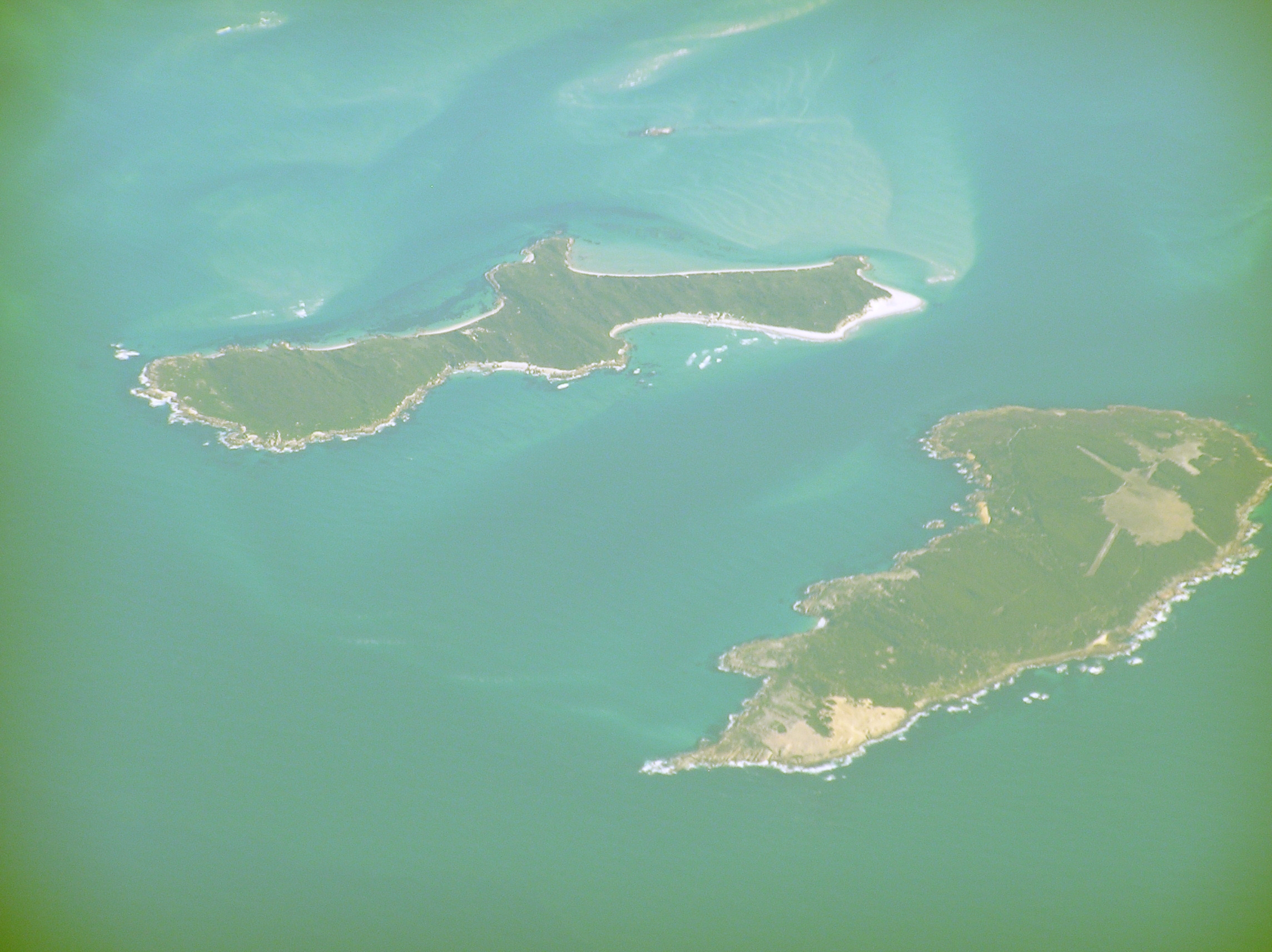
- Passage Island on the bottom right; with Forsyth Island, centre.

- Location within Tasmania

Geography
- Location: Bass Strait
- Coordinates: 40°29′24″S 148°19′48″E
- Archipelago: Passage Group, part of the Furneaux Group
- Area: 253 ha (630 acres)

Administration
- Australia
- State: Tasmania

The Passage Island, part of the Passage Group within the Furneaux Group, is a 253-hectare (630-acre) granite and dolerite island, located in Bass Strait south of Cape Barren Island, in Tasmania, in south-eastern Australia.

== History ==
Large numbers of fur seals were seen on the island in 1798 by Matthew Flinders and sealers were later reported visiting the island early in the 19th century.

The island is a private island with leasehold tenure, with a pastoral lease that has been used for grazing cattle. Improvements on the island include airstrips and a small residence. With the Forsyth and Gull islands, the Passage Island forms part of the Forsyth, Passage and Gull Islands Important Bird Area (IBA), identified as such by BirdLife International because it supports over 1% of the world populations of little penguins and black-faced cormorants.

Besides Passage Island, other islands that comprise the Passage Group include the Forsyth, Gull, Battery, and Spike islands, and the Low Islets and the Moriarty Rocks.

== Fauna ==
Recorded breeding seabird, wader and waterbird species include little penguin, short-tailed shearwater, Pacific gull, silver gull, sooty oystercatcher and Cape Barren goose. Apart from cattle, mammals present are the introduced European rabbit, house mouse and a species of rat. Reptiles present include White's skink and the metallic skink.

== See also ==
- List of islands of Tasmania
