= Night Island (Tasmania) =

Island in Tasmania, Australia

Coordinates: 40°29′S 148°01′E

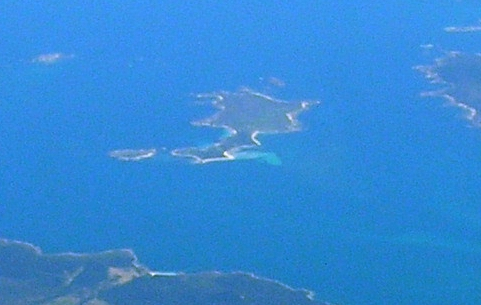
Night Island is the tiny island on the top left of this picture of Preservation Island

Night Island is a small granite island, with an area of 2.59 ha, is part of the Preservation Island Group, lying in eastern Bass Strait south of Cape Barren Island in the Furneaux Group, Tasmania, Australia.

It is a Conservation Area. The island has been identified by BirdLife International as an Important Bird Area (IBA) because it holds over 1% of the world population of black-faced cormorants.

== Fauna ==
As well as up to 138 pairs of black-faced cormorants, recorded breeding seabird and wader species include little penguin, Pacific gull and sooty oystercatcher.

Other islands in the Preservation Group with breeding seabirds include the Preservation Island, the Preservation Islets, and the Rum Island.

== See also ==
- List of islands of Tasmania
