= Spike Island (Tasmania) =

Island in Tasmania, Australia

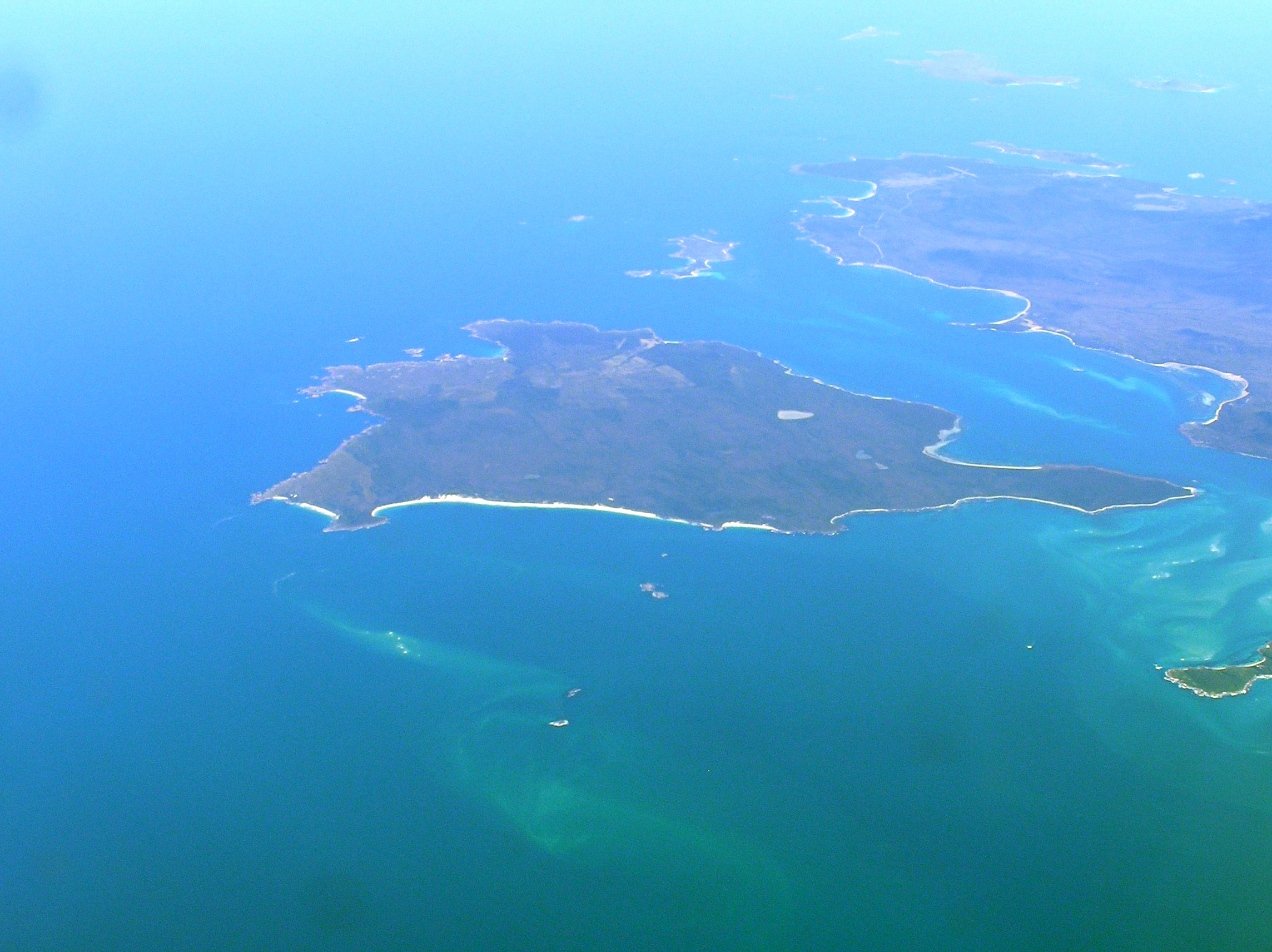
- An aerial view of Clarke Island, centre; with Spike Island being two small islands in mid-foreground, close to Clarke Island

- Location within Tasmania

Geography
- Location: Bass Strait
- Coordinates: 40°33′00″S 148°06′00″E
- Archipelago: Passage Group, part of the Furneaux Group
- Total islands: 2
- Area: 6 ha (15 acres)

Administration
- Australia
- State: Tasmania

The Spike Island, part of the Passage Group within the Furneaux Group, is a close pair of unpopulated granite islands with a combined area of 6 hectares (15 acres), located in Bass Strait, south of Cape Barren Island in Spike Bay just off the west coast of Clarke Island, in Tasmania, in south-eastern Australia.

== Fauna ==
Recorded breeding seabird and wader species include little penguin, Pacific gull, silver gull and sooty oystercatcher.

== See also ==
- List of islands of Tasmania
