= Rum Island (Tasmania) =

Island in Tasmania, Australia

Coordinates: 40°29′S 148°04′E

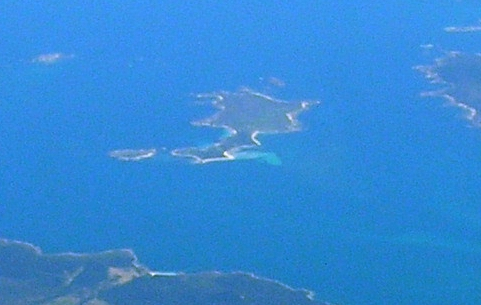
Rum Island is the small Island to the bottom left of Preservation Island

Rum Island is a granite island, with an area of 13.5 ha, just south of Preservation Island in south-eastern Australia. It is part of Tasmania’s Preservation Island Group, lying in eastern Bass Strait south-west of Cape Barren Island in the Furneaux Group. It is part of the Sydney Cove historic site.

== Fauna ==
Recorded breeding seabird and wader species include little penguin, short-tailed shearwater, Pacific gull, sooty oystercatcher and Caspian tern. The metallic skink is present on the island.

Other islands in the Preservation Group with breeding seabirds include the Night Island, the Preservation Island, and the Preservation Islets.

== See also ==
- List of islands of Tasmania
