= Sydney Cove (1796 ship) =

Ship wrecked en route from Calcutta to Port Jackson in 1797

Coordinates: 40.49°S 148.07°E

History

Great Britain
- Name: Begum Shaw
- Renamed: Sydney Cove (1796)
- Fate: Wrecked 9 February 1797

General characteristics
- Tons burthen: 250 (bm)
- Propulsion: Sail

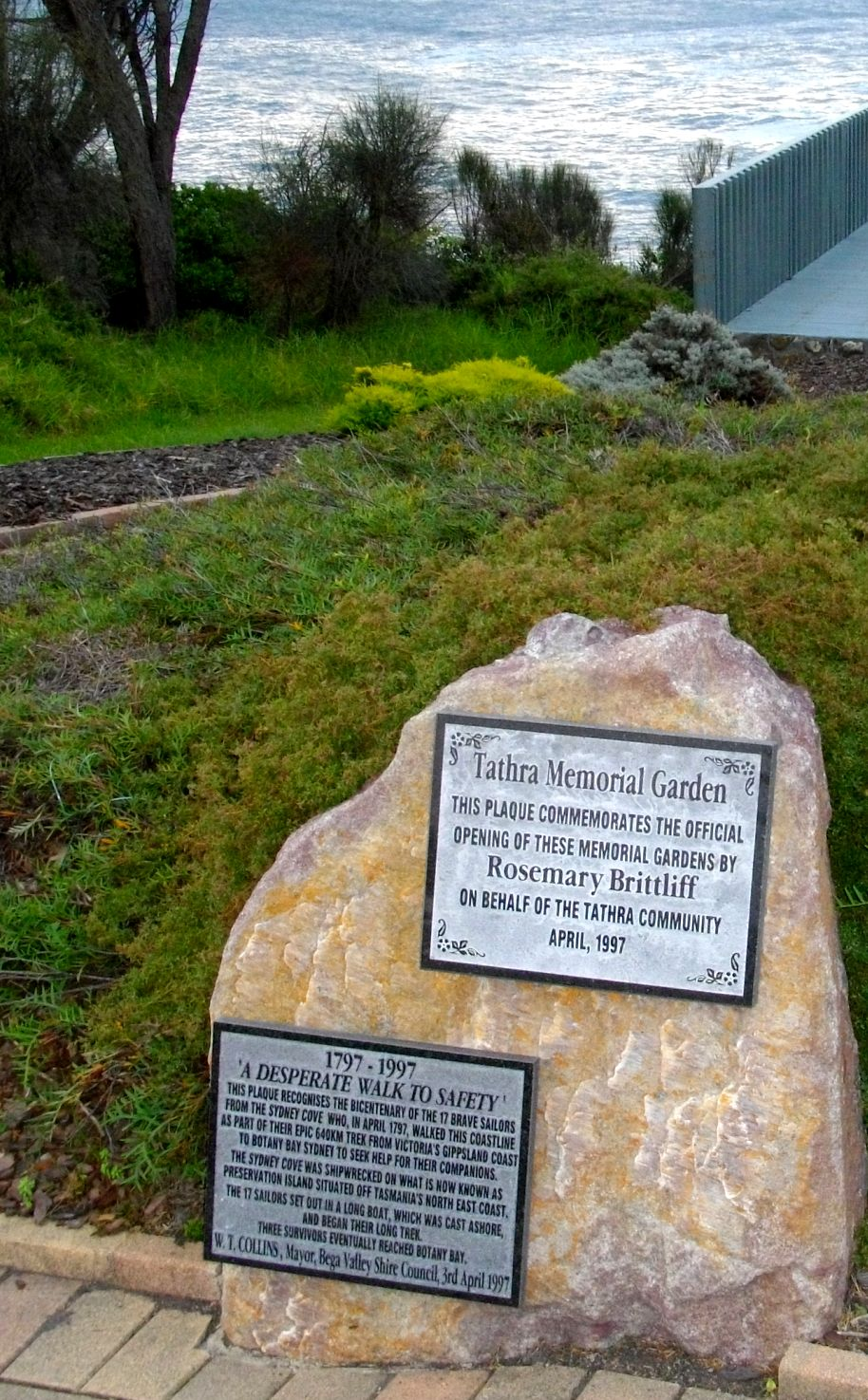
Memorial plaque at Tathra

Sydney Cove was the Bengal country ship Begum Shaw that new owners purchased in 1796 to carry goods to Sydney Cove, in the colony of New South Wales, and renamed for her destination. She was wrecked in 1797 on Preservation Island off Tasmania while on her way from Calcutta to Port Jackson. She was among the first ships wrecked on the east coast of Australia.

== Voyage ==
The ship was built in Calcutta as part of the rice fleet, under the name Begum Shaw. She arrived at Calcutta on 30 May 1796 from Coringa. This was shortly after the ship Sovereign had arrived from Port Jackson and reported on conditions there. Sovereign's agents were the agency house (private trading firm) of Campbell and Clark. Campbell and Clark purchased Begum Shaw, renamed her Sydney Cove, retained her owner and master Gavin (or Guy) Hamilton as master, and provided her with a cargo that consisted of various provisions, spirits, and goods. The venture was speculative, meaning the goods had not been ordered by the colony, but rather were to be sold on arrival.

Sydney Cove departed on 10 November 1796. She encountered heavy seas in December that started a leak. Further bad weather in January 1797 increased it, so that the water had to be continuously pumped out. In February, off the east coast of Tasmania, additional heavy weather saw the leak gaining on the bailing efforts.

== Grounding and survival ==
On 9 February, with the water up to the lower-deck hatches, putting Sydney Cove in imminent danger of sinking, Hamilton decided to ground the stricken vessel on the island now called Preservation Island, which is in the Furneaux Group, north of Tasmania. He chose a sheltered location so everyone was able to get ashore safely and most of the cargo was saved, too. He had the salvaged rum stored safely out of the crew's reach, on nearby Rum Island.

On 28 February 1797, leaving about 30 survivors with the wreckage, a party of 17 men set off on in the ship's longboat to reach help at Port Jackson, 400 nautical miles (740 km) away. This was led by first mate Hugh Thompson, and included William Clark (the supercargo), three European seamen, and twelve Indian lascars (sailors). Ill fortune struck again and they were wrecked on the mainland at the northern end of Ninety Mile Beach. Their only hope was to walk along the shore all the way to Sydney, a distance of over 600 km (370 mi).

They had few provisions and no ammunition, and fatigue and hunger lessened their number as they marched. Along the way they encountered various Aboriginal people, some friendly, some not. The last of the party to die on the march was killed by a man named Dilba and his people near Hat Hill. Those people had a reputation around Port Jackson for being ferocious. Matthew Flinders and George Bass had feared for their safety when they had encountered Dilba the previous year.

In May 1797, the three survivors of the march, William Clark, sailor John Bennet, and one lascar had made it to the cove at Wattamolla and, on 15 May 1797, with their strength nearly at an end, they were able to signal a boat out fishing, which took them on to Sydney.

On the march, Clark had noted coal in the cliffs at what is now called Coalcliff between Sydney and Wollongong. This was the second instance of coal discovered in Australia.

== Rescue and salvage ==
The schooner Francis and the sloop Eliza were dispatched to Preservation Island to collect the people remaining there and salvage the ship's cargo. While waiting for rescue, the survivors had lived on the local short-tailed shearwaters, also called Australian muttonbirds, and built rough shelter for themselves.

The survivors also ate – and named – the Cape Barren goose. The name derives from the south-eastern promontory (cape) of the island now known as Cape Barren Island, which had been named by Tobias Furneaux in 1773.

However, Sydney Cove was damaged in May by heavy westerly gales, making it impossible to save her.

On the return journey, Francis and Eliza became separated, and Eliza was wrecked, with the loss of her crew as well as eight of the Sydney Cove survivors. Francis made a further salvage voyage in December and again in January 1798. Matthew Flinders was aboard the third voyage, assigned to make geographical observations. He noted petrels and seals, and located and named the Kent Group of islands.

At the same time, George Bass was on his whaleboat voyage, following the coast of the mainland, and he had thought to make for Sydney Cove to replenish his provisions, but leaks in his boat prevented him setting that course. He did, however, encounter a group of escaped convicts marooned on an island. They, too, had been making for the wrecked ship with the false hope of re-floating her and escaping.

== Legacy ==
When the master of Sydney Cove reached Sydney, he reported that the strong south-westerly swell and the tides and currents suggested that the island was in a channel linking the Pacific and southern Indian Ocean. The Governor of New South Wales, John Hunter, wrote to Joseph Banks in August 1797 that it seemed certain the strait existed.

The salvage team also collected and preserved a wombat, which they forwarded to England for scientific observation, and observed colonies of seals. Seal hunters became active in the area soon afterwards.

The Cape Barren goose retains its common name, ascribed by the survivors of Sydney Cove.

In 1997, a re-enactment of the epic journey was completed by members of Scouts NSW and the community. The re-enactment, called The Long Long Walk, was arranged by Warren Goodall of Oak Flats, who used the diary of the survivors to help with planning the walk. Artefacts from the ship wreck were used as a baton and passed from one walking team to another throughout the trip. Descendants of the ship's captain, Guy Hamilton, were met by Mr Goodall at Wattamolla who presented them with the artefacts, which in turn were handed to the Rookwood Cemetery Museum.

== Wreck and remains ==
The wreck was relocated in 1977, lying partly covered by sand in about 3–6 m (9.8–19.7 ft) of water. By 2016, excavations had been made to recover artefacts and some timbers. The Queen Victoria Museum & Art Gallery in Launceston has a display of items from the ship, including the world's oldest bottle of beer.

The survivors' camp was excavated in 2002. In 2016, new Saccharomyces and Brettanomyces strains of yeast genetically similar to those used in Trappist Ale were isolated from one of the 26 beer bottles recovered from the wreck 20 years earlier. In August 2018 James Squire released a limited number of bottles of "Preservation Ale", made from this yeast.
