= Aboriginal Lands Act 1995 =

Law in Tasmania, Australia

Parliament of Tasmania
- Long title: An Act to promote reconciliation with the Tasmanian Aboriginal community by granting to Aboriginal people certain parcels of land of historic or cultural significance
- Citation: Aboriginal Lands Act 1995 (TAS) (no. 98 of 1995)
- Assented to: 14 November 1995
- Status: Current legislation

The Aboriginal Lands Act 1995 is a statute passed by the Parliament of Tasmania that came into effect on 14 November 1995. It provided for the establishment of an elected Aboriginal Land Council of Tasmania. The Council consists of eight members elected by Tasmanian indigenous people. The Act enables that land of significance to Tasmanian indigenous people is to be returned to the community and held on trust by the council.
