= Wattamolla =

Cove and beach in New South Wales, Australia

- Beach
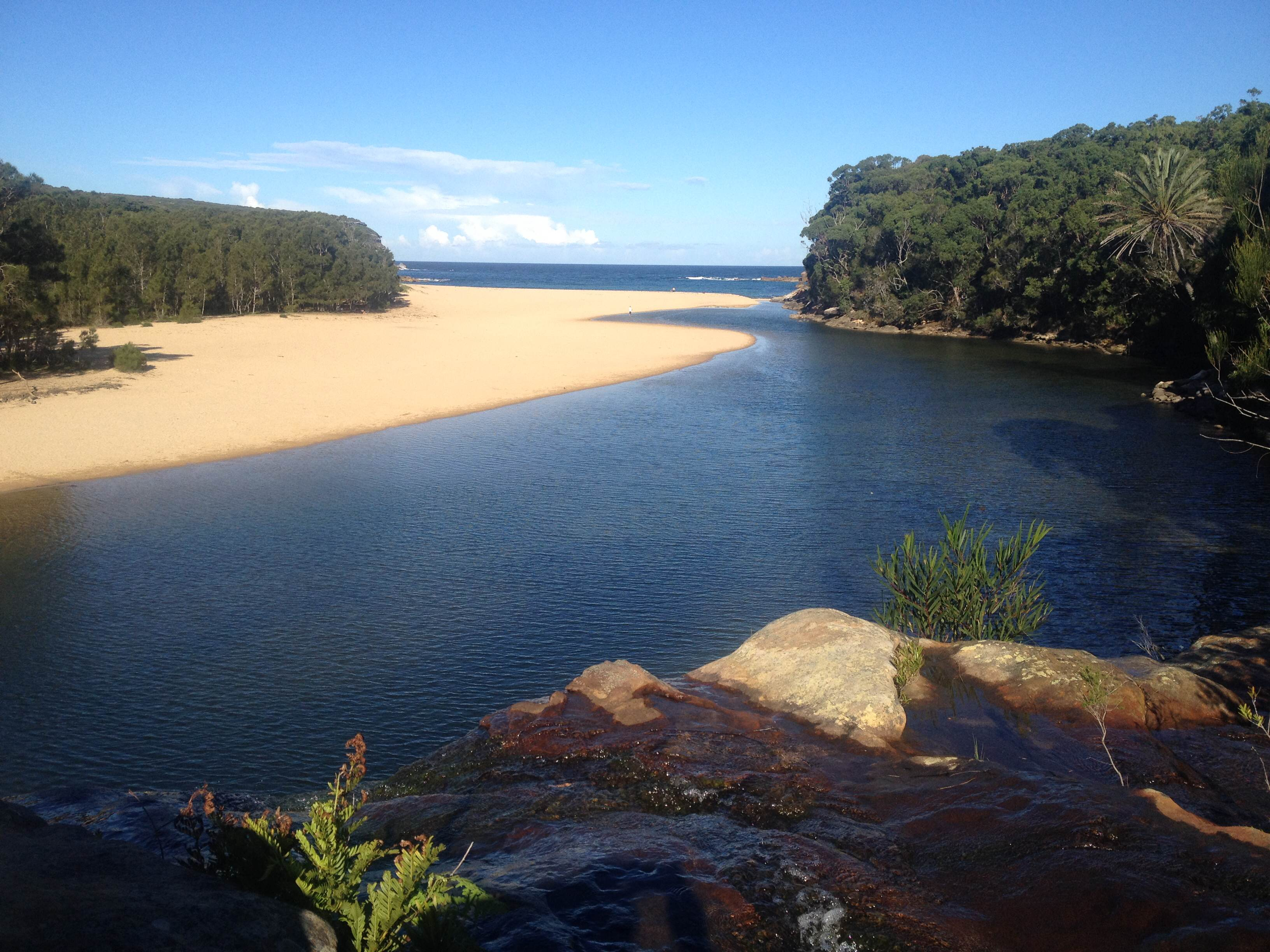
- Wattamolla lagoon, looking towards the Tasman Sea, with Wattamolla Beach in the distance and the waterfall in the foreground
- Interactive map of Wattamolla
- Coordinates: 34°08′15″S 151°07′04″E
- Location: Royal National Park, New South Wales, Australia

Dimensions
  - Length: 150 m (490 ft)
- Hazard rating: 4/10 (moderately hazardous)
- Access: Wattamolla Road (transport); Royal National Park Coast Track (foot)

Wattamolla, also known as Wattamolla Beach, is a cove, lagoon, and beach on the New South Wales coast south of Sydney, within the Royal National Park.

== Geography ==
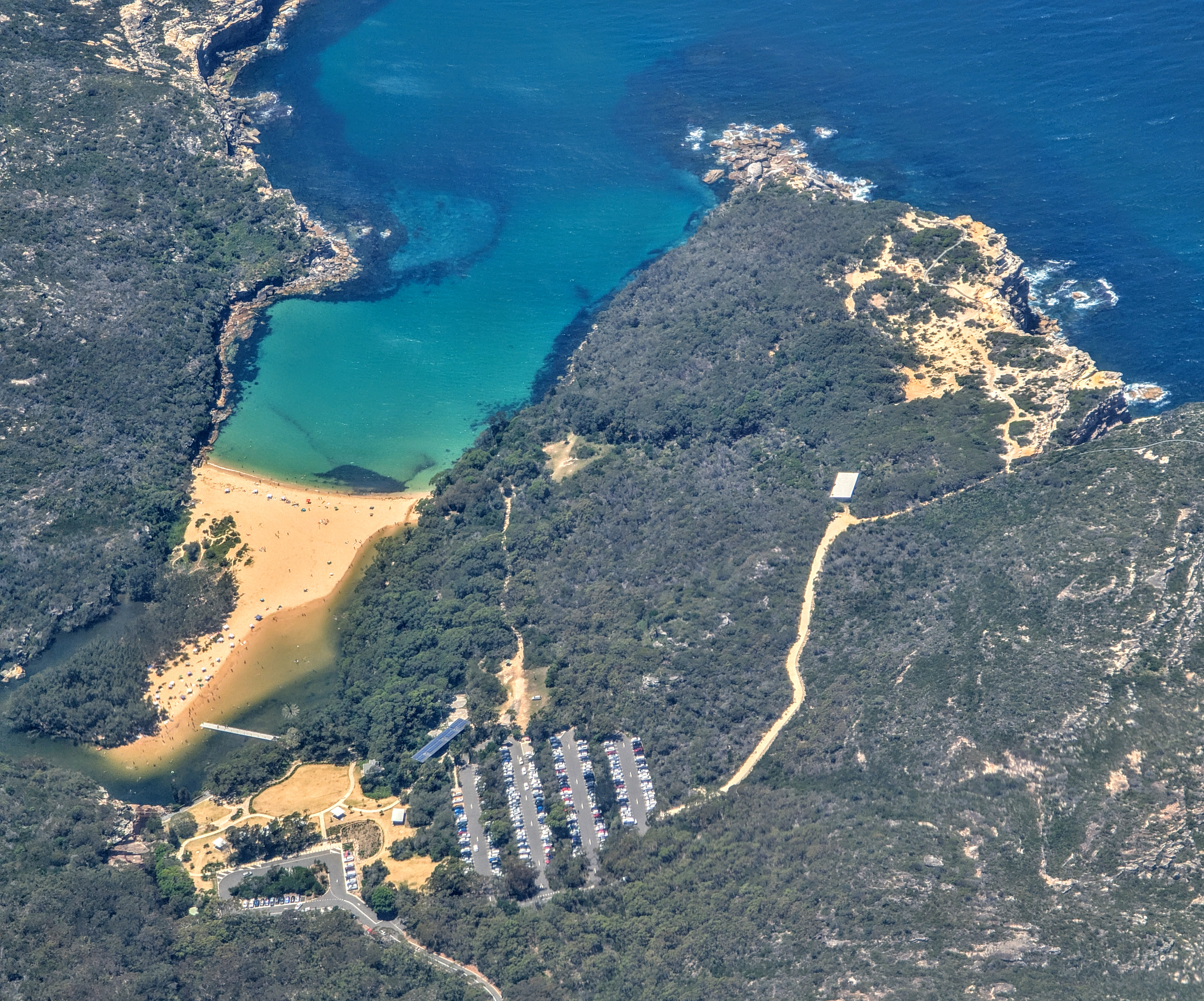
Aerial view of Wattamolla

Wattamolla is the junction of two creeks: Wattamolla Creek, which flows in from the northwest, forming a lagoon behind the beach, and the smaller Cootes Creek, which joins the lagoon from the west via a waterfall. A rocky outcrop lies behind the beach between the main channels of the two creeks. Due to the interaction of waterflow from the two creeks as well as tidal forces, the size of the lagoon and the configuration of its outlets to the sea change continuously. The outcrop in between the channels of the two creeks is usually, but not always, connected via the beach to either or both banks of the cove. Works completed in 2022 have created a fenced lookout area above the waterfall, and a newly landscaped picnic area. Road access is to the southwest of the lagoon, and access to the beach from the car parking area is usually via stairs that descend to the outlet of Cootes Creek in the east, but (where the outlet is carrying large volumes of water) sometimes change to a seasonally placed bridge across the west of the lagoon.

== History ==
Wattamolla is the local Aboriginal name of the area, meaning "place near running water". That name was recorded as Watta-Mowlee by Matthew Flinders, but is today spelt Wattamolla.

Matthew Flinders, George Bass and a boy, William Martin had been exploring the south-coast from Port Jackson as far as Lake Illawarra, in a small boat named Tom Thumb. Returning on the evening of 29 March 1796, a southerly gale forced them to seek shelter.

At ten 'o'clock, the wind, which had been unsettled and driving electric clouds in all directions, burst out in a gale at south, and obliged us to get up the anchor immediately, and run before it. Matthew Flinders

Flinders, "steering with an oar", thought the dark outline of cliffs ended and believed he saw breakers, so he turned the boat towards shore. Catching a large wave, they "shot across a sandbar" and in moments were in the calm sheltered water of the lagoon, which in relief they named Providential Cove.

On 15 May 1797, three members of the crew of the Sydney Cove were spotted by a fisherman on Wattamolla Beach, having trekked from the Ninety Mile Beach Victoria on route to Sydney, to seek help rescuing their crew.

The headland to the south of Providential Cove is named "Providential Point", but was previously named "Boy Martin Point". The headland to the north is named "Martin Head".

== Gallery ==
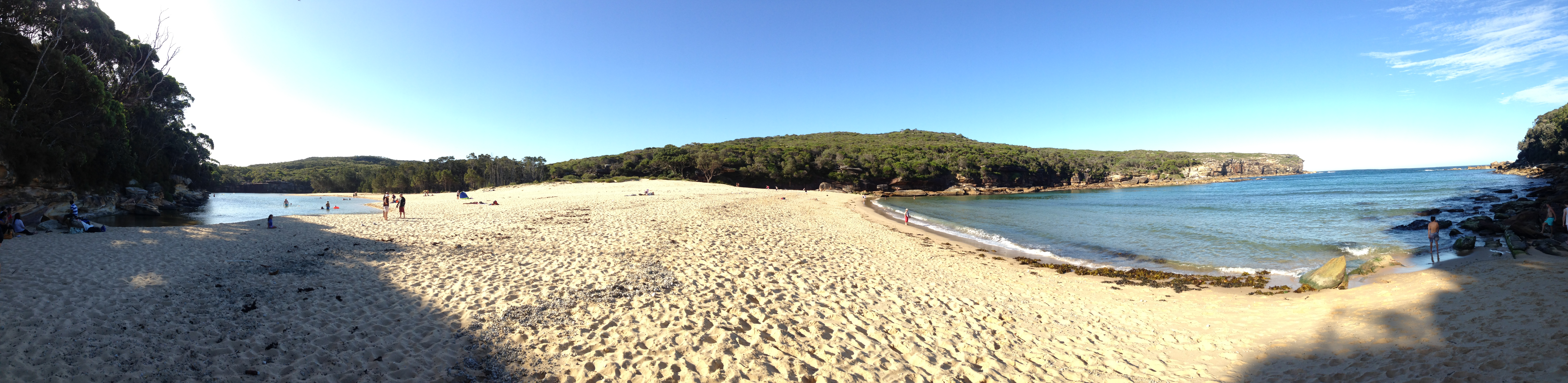
Panorama of Wattamolla. Click to enlarge.

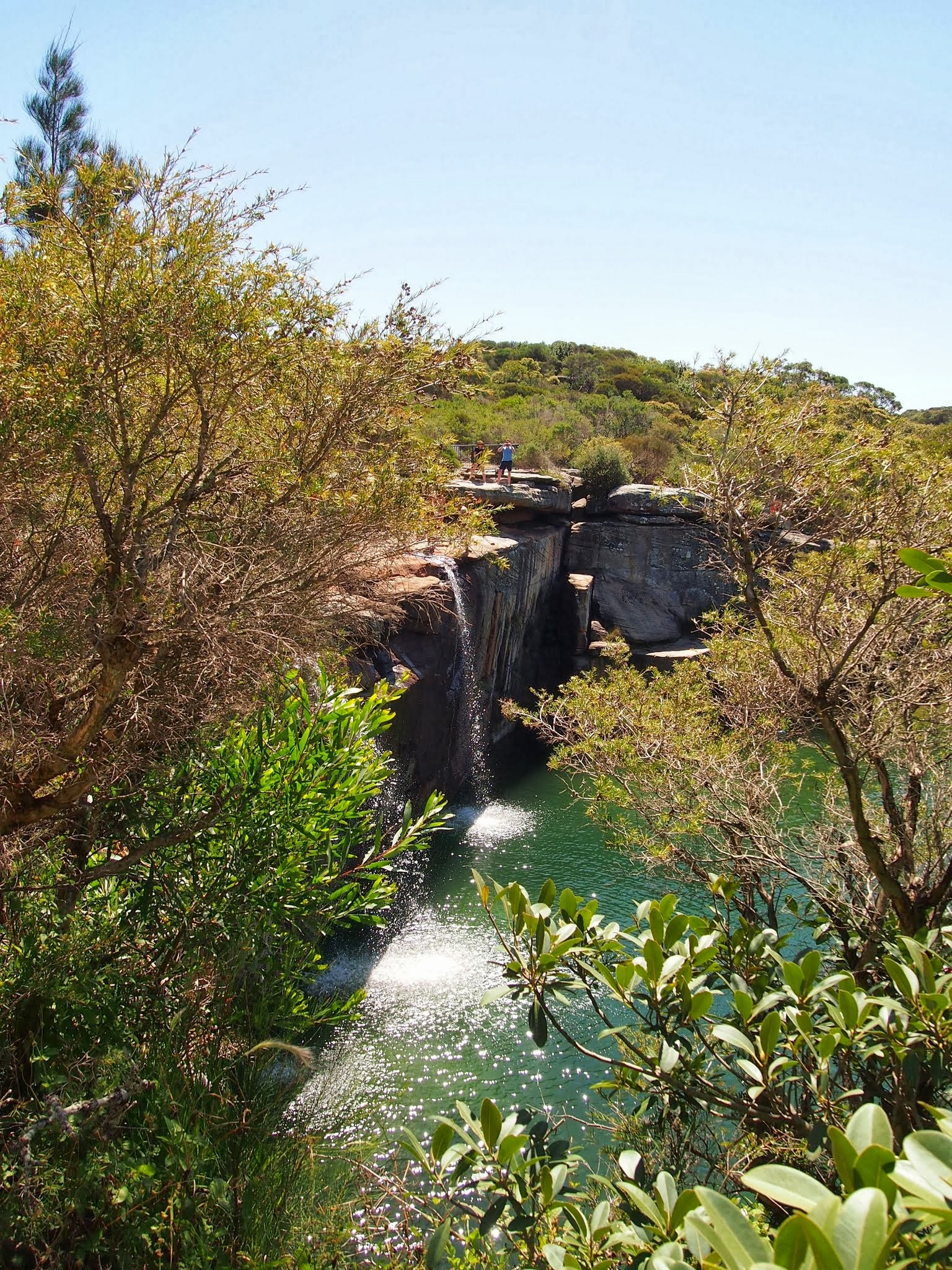
Waterfall

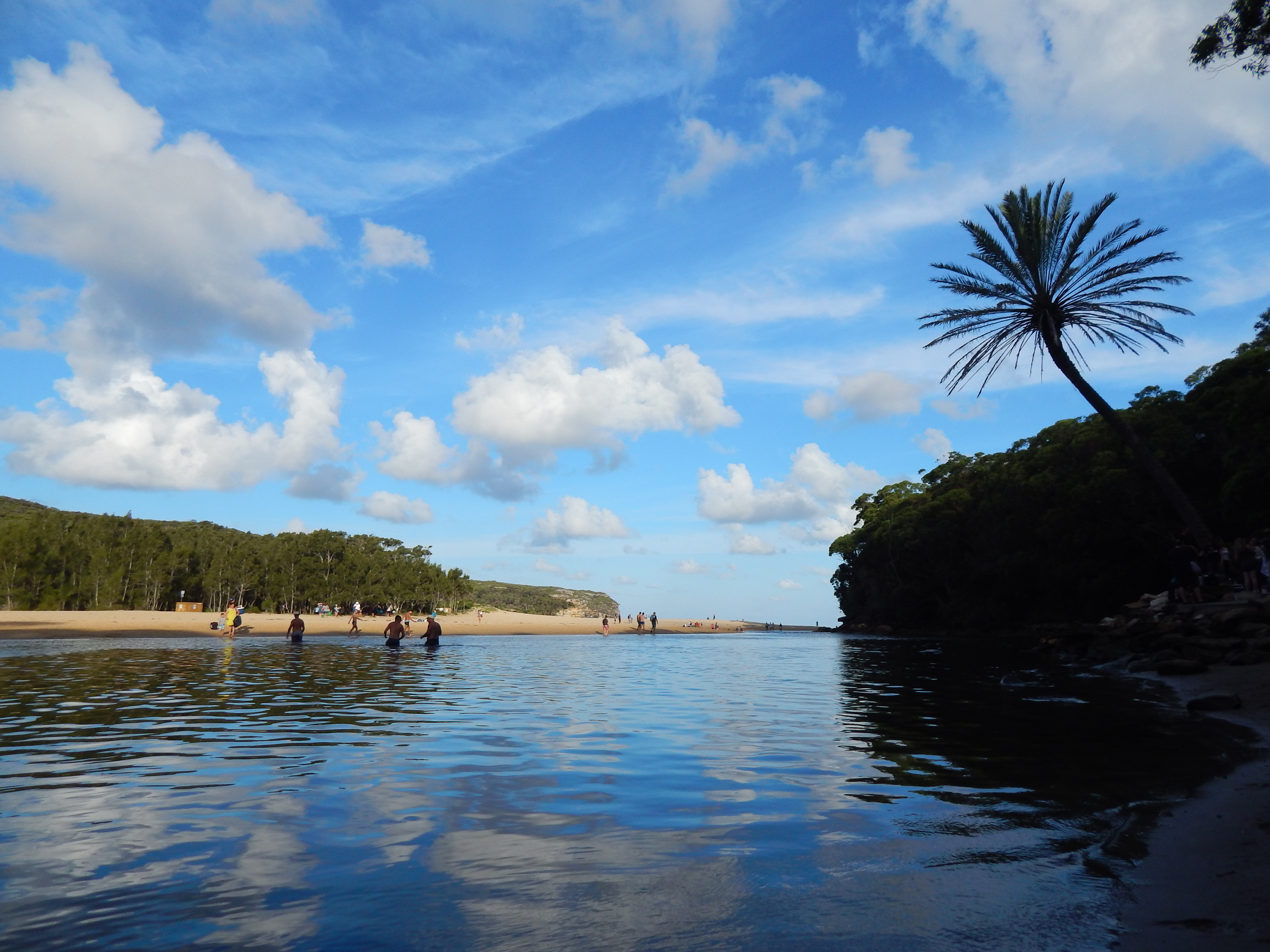

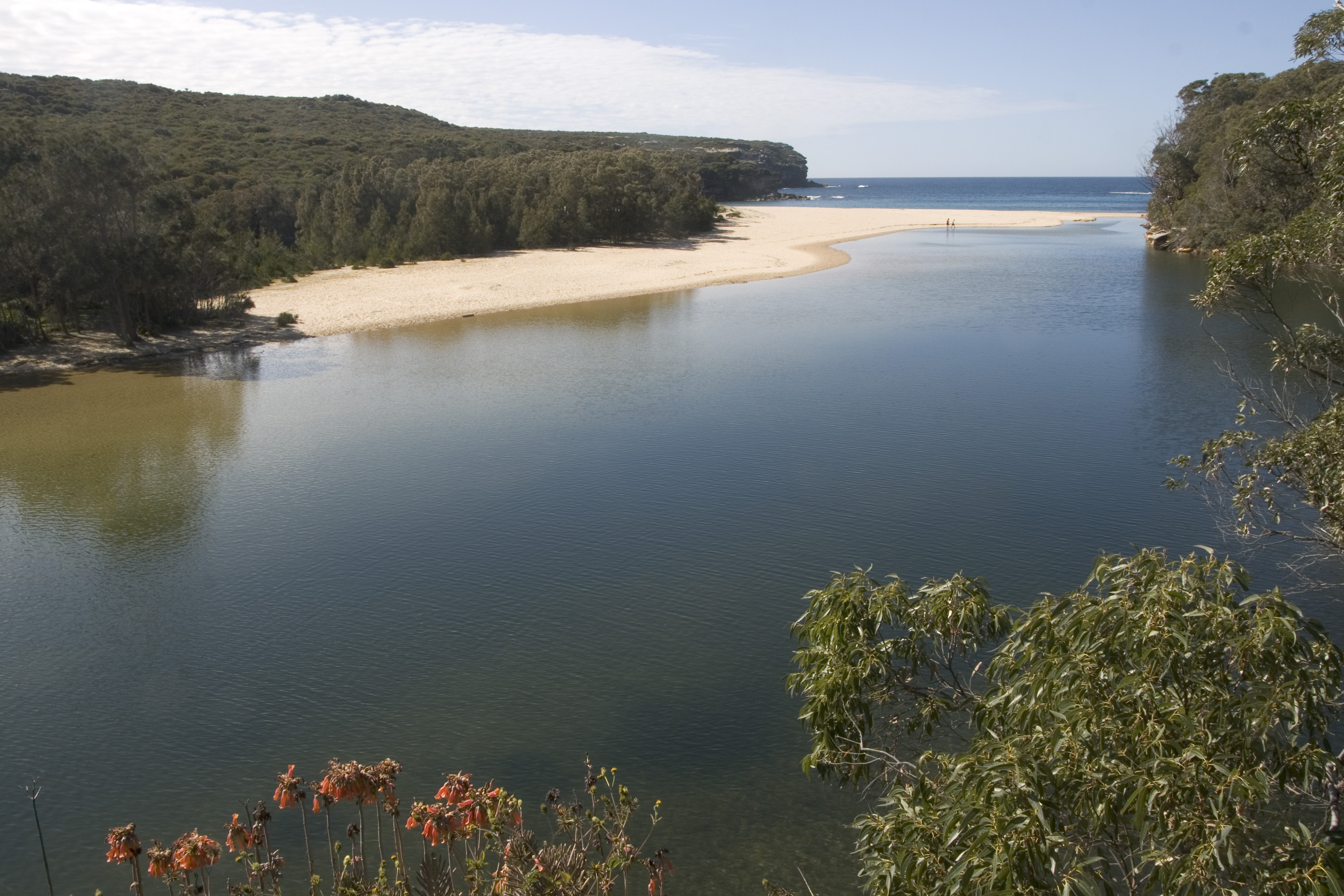
Lagoon with beach in background.

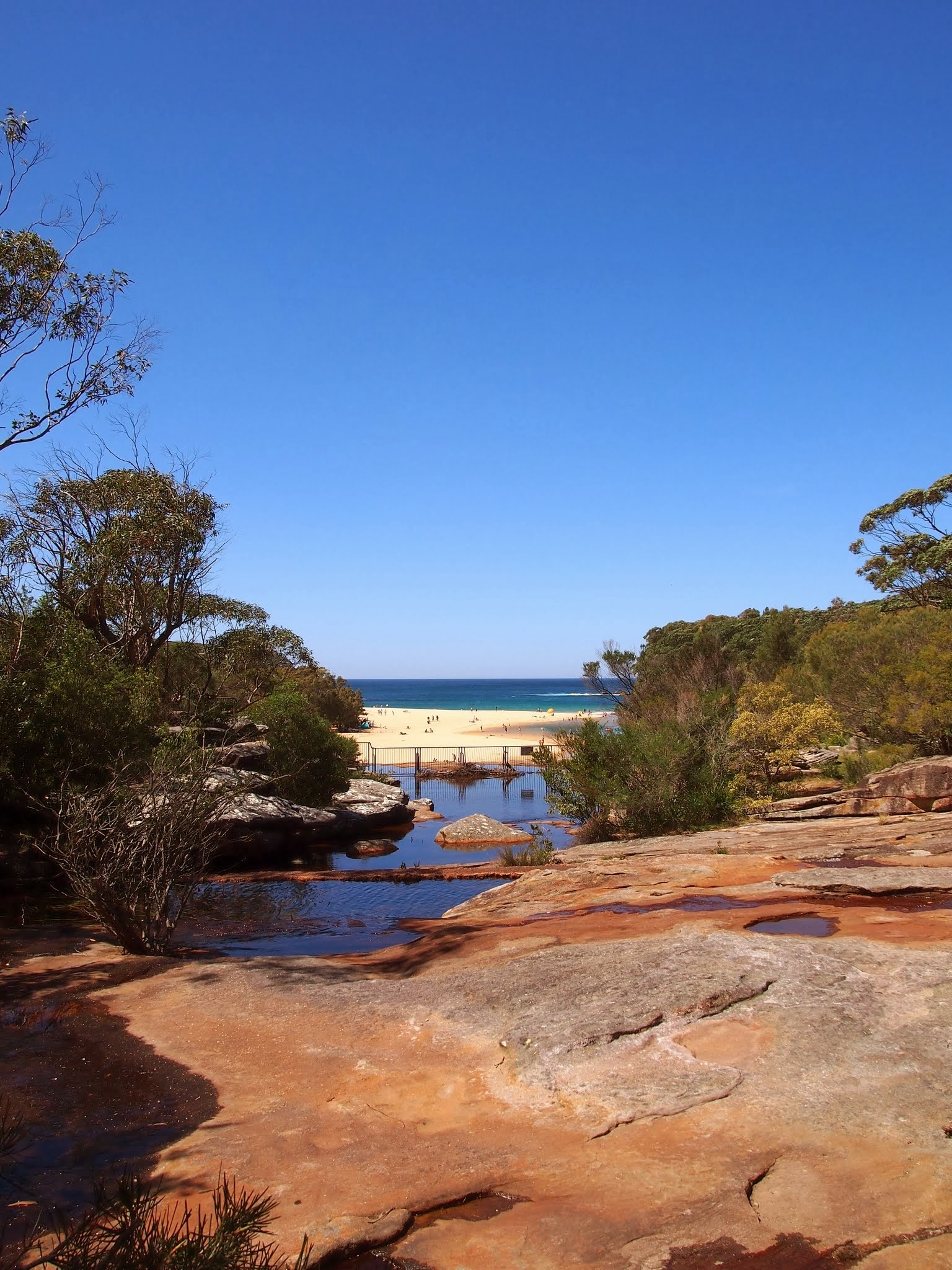

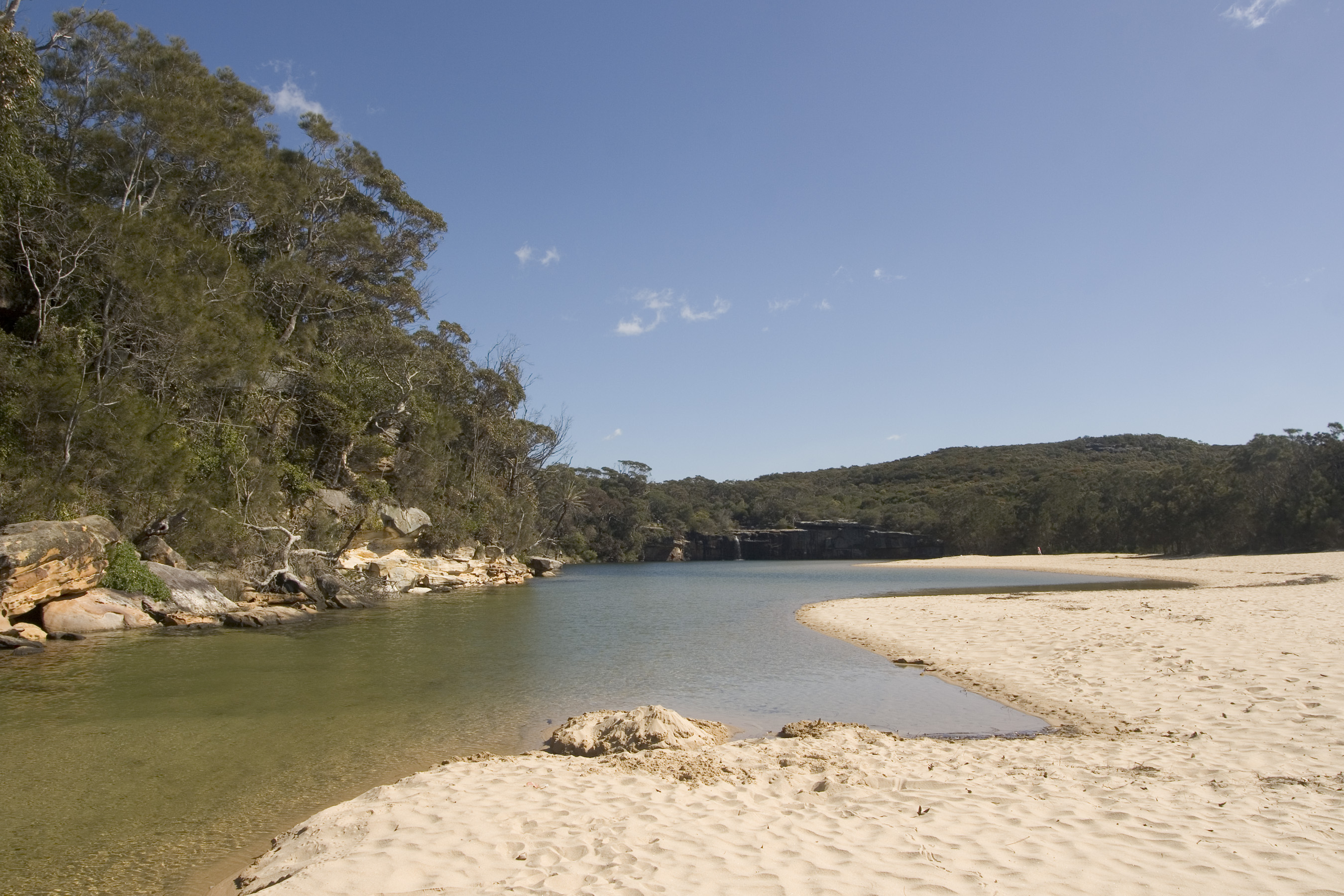
Closeup of lagoon

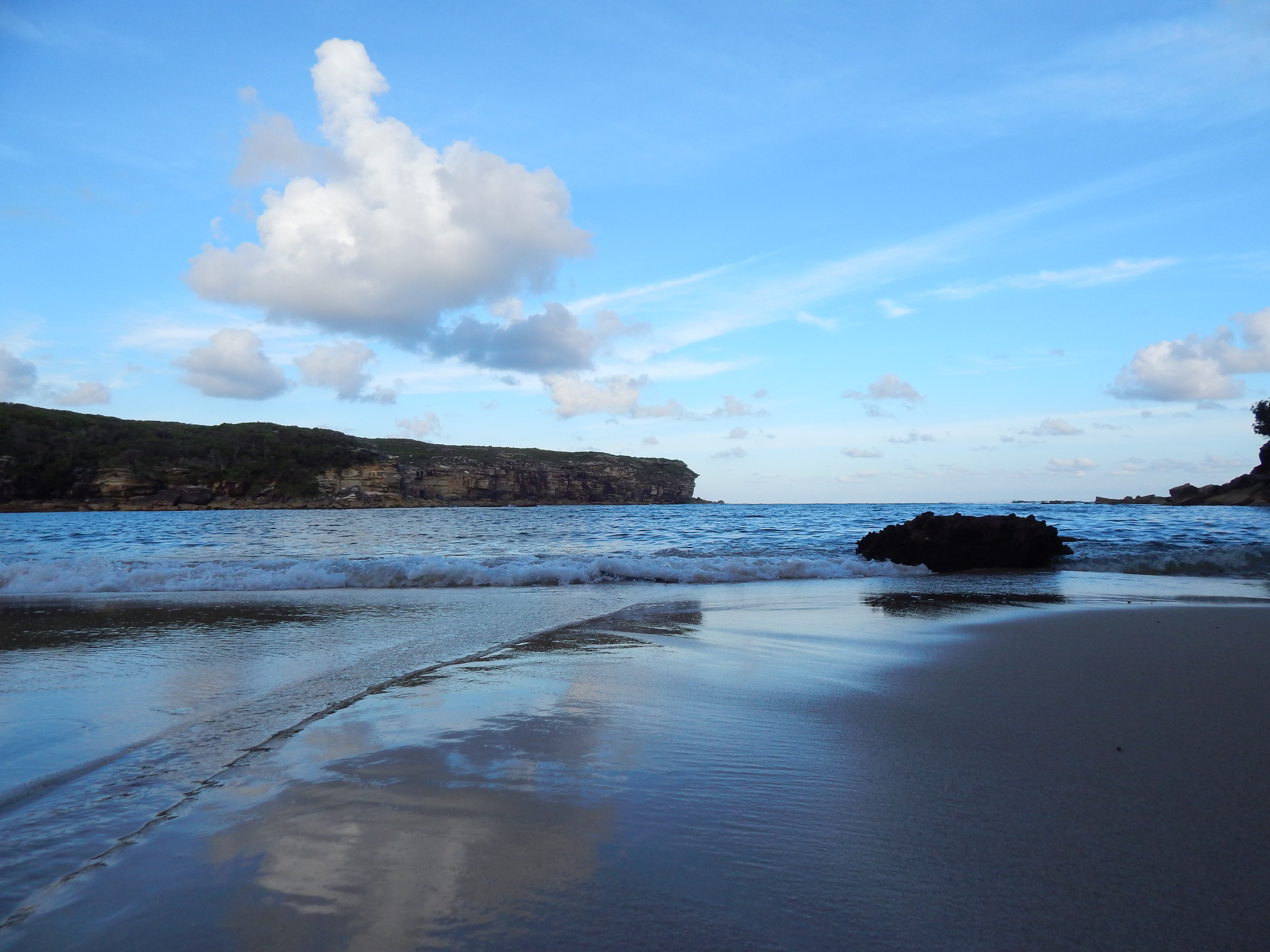
The beach

== See also ==
- Sydney Cove (1796 ship)
