= Preservation Island =

Island in Tasmania, Australia

Coordinates: 40°29′S 148°04′E

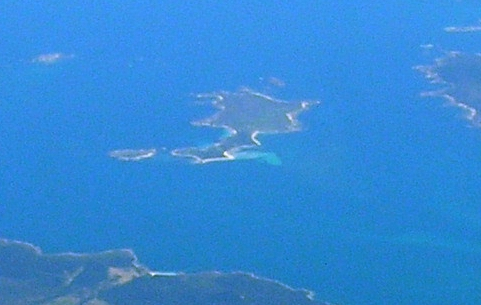
Preservation Island view from south east, Clarke Island beneath

Preservation Island is a low and undulating granite and calcarenite island, with an area of 207 ha, in south-eastern Australia. It is part of Tasmania’s Preservation Island Group, lying in eastern Bass Strait south-west of Cape Barren Island in the Furneaux Group, and is an important historic site.

== History ==
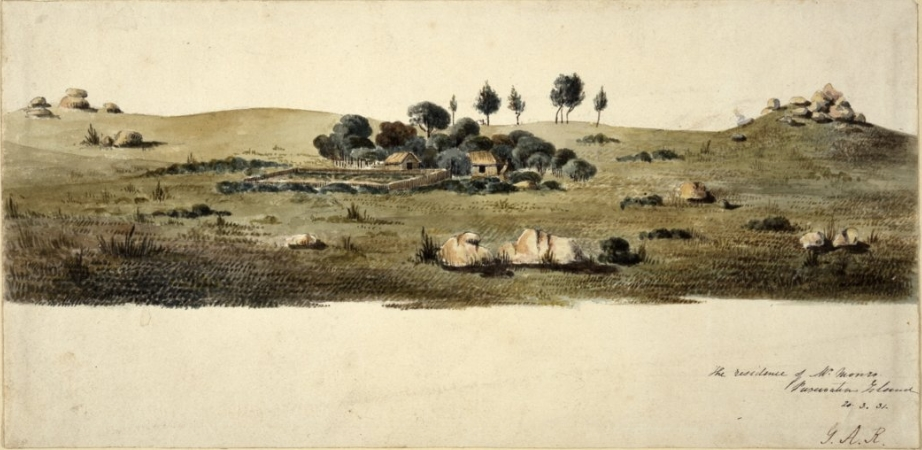
A sealer's hut on a broad plain (1831)

Preservation Island was named following the grounding deliberately of the merchant ship Sydney Cove there in February 1797, predating the discovery of Bass Strait by George Bass and Matthew Flinders in 1798. Subsequently, the island was a base for sealers exploiting fur seals and southern elephant seals during the early-to-mid 19th century and was the permanent home of sealer James Munro and several Tasmanian Aboriginal women and mixed race children until his death there in 1845. During that period and afterwards, the island has been used for grazing goats and cattle.

In 2016, using a previously unknown Saccharomyces strain of yeast isolated from a beer bottle recovered from the wreck of Sydney Cove wreck, a beer called Preservation Ale, similar to Trappist Ale, has been brewed in name of the island.

== Flora and fauna ==
Nearly two centuries of grazing livestock, as well as frequent fires and consequent wind erosion, have severely modified the natural plant communities. The northern section of the island is infested with African boxthorn, with much of the rest covered by Poa and Stipa grassland.

Recorded breeding seabird and wader species include little penguin, short-tailed shearwater, Pacific gull and sooty oystercatcher. Brown quail also breed there. Land degradation by stock grazing has reduced numbers of burrowing seabirds. Reptiles present include the blotched blue-tongued lizard, tiger snake and white-lipped snake.

Other islands in the Preservation Group with breeding seabirds include the Night Island, the Preservation Islets, and the Rum Island.

== See also ==
- List of islands of Tasmania
