= Cape Barren Island =

Island in Tasmania, Australia

Native name: truwana
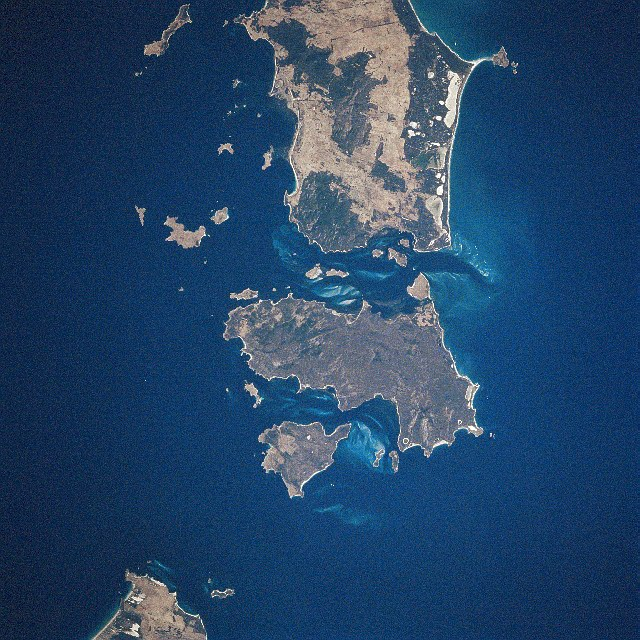
- Cape Barren Island (centre) from space, January 1997

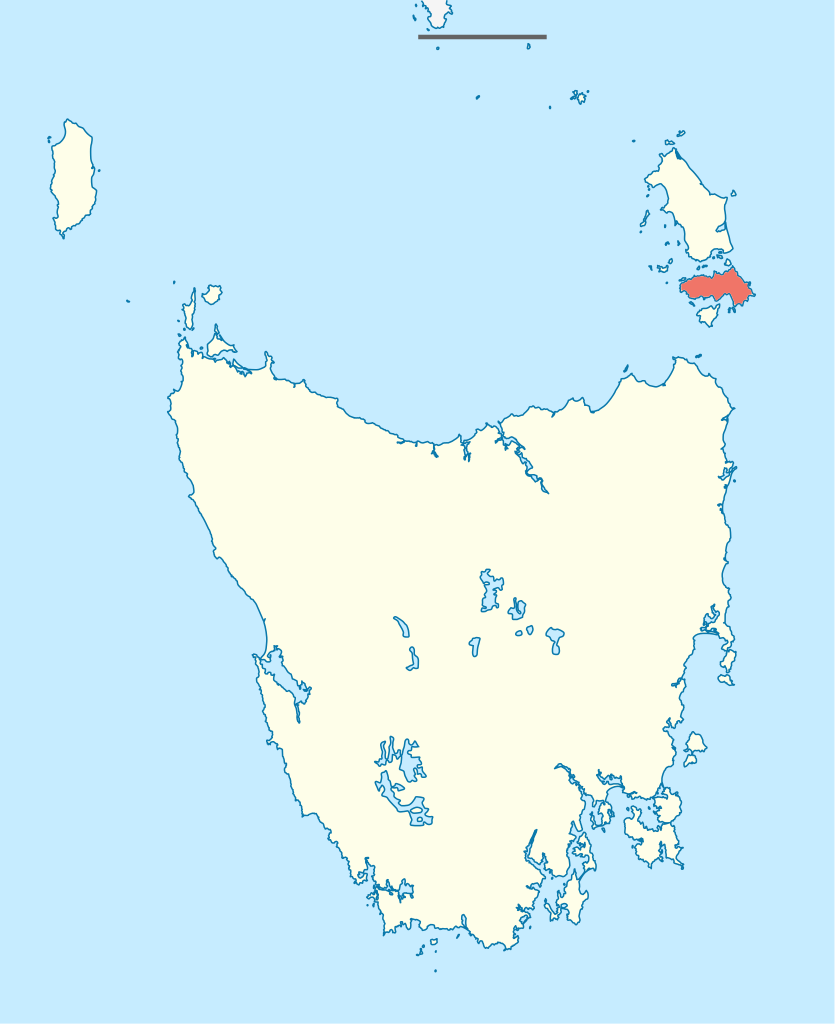
- Cape Barren Island (Tasmania)

Geography
- Location: Bass Strait
- Coordinates: 40.402°S 147.991°E
- Area: 478.4 km^{2} (184.7 sq mi)
- Highest elevation: 715 m (2346 ft)
- Highest point: Mount Munro

Administration
- Australia
- State: Tasmania
- LGA: Municipality of Flinders Island
- Largest settlement: The Corner

Demographics
- Population: 64 (2021)
- Pop. density: 0.14/km^{2} (0.36/sq mi)

Ramsar Wetland
- Official name: Cape Barren Island, east coast lagoons
- Designated: 16 November 1982
- Reference no.: 256

Cape Barren Island, officially truwana / Cape Barren Island, is a 478-square-kilometre (185 sq mi) island in Bass Strait, off the north-east coast of Tasmania, Australia. It is the second-largest island of the Furneaux Group, with the larger Flinders Island to the north, and the smaller Clarke Island to the south. The highest point on the island is Mount Munro at 715 metres (2,346 ft). The name of the island derives from the cape on the south-eastern point of the island, which was named "Cape Barren" by Tobias Furneaux in March 1773. Australia's only native goose, the Cape Barren goose, was first documented by European explorers on the island. The number of permanent residents is variously estimated around 65-80 (2021/2025), most of whom live in a settlement called "The Corner".

== History ==
Aboriginal people inhabited or used the islands in the Bass Strait long before ships came from the other side of the world, when Tasmania was joined to the mainland, but the Furneaux group had been uninhabited and not managed for around 2000 years before Europeans came.

The south-eastern point of the island was named Cape Barren by Tobias Furneaux in HMS Adventure on 17 March 1773. The name of the Cape Barren goose was first ascribed to this species by shipwreck survivors in 1797, when Sydney Cove ran aground off Preservation Island, south of the island. The sailors who survived the wreck used the geese as one of few sources of food on the island, and named it after Cape Barren.

The rescue mission for the stranded sailors led to further interest in the islands, and sealing is known to have taken place from 1798, when the 80-ton brig Nautilus, under Captain Charles Bishop, arrived from Sydney to commence commercial sealing in Bass Strait. Operations began in Kent's Bay and nearly 9000 seal skins were taken in the first season. Other vessels followed from Sydney and the United States. Competition between the sealing gangs led to a violent clash between American and British sealers in 1803.

The sealers brought Aboriginal captives or wives from other islands, and farmers started deforesting and breeding sheep there. They hunted the geese for food. After the sealers left by around 1820, the permanent settlers continued to eat the geese and their eggs, resulting in near extinction of the species by 1847, but the population has since recovered.

Mount Munro and Munro Bay are named after James Munro (c. 1779-1845), a former convict turned sealer who, from the 1820s, lived for more than 20 years with various Aboriginal women on nearby Preservation Island.

In 1871 the residents of the island petitioned Governor Charles Du Cane to give them exclusive use of the mutton bird rookeries, and some land to call their own. They were allocated two 10-hectare (25-acre) blocks for homesteads and farming. After being joined by Anglican missionaries in their campaign, the colonial government of Tasmania established a formal 2,500-hectare (6,200-acre) Aboriginal reserve in 1881. Until around 1901, the reserve was co-managed and funded by the government and the Anglican Church, but there was no Aboriginal protection legislation. There was no residential mission, and the person in charge as missionary and school teacher had little say in the welfare of the people. The role of the church declined in the twentieth century. The church had been under Bishop Henry Montgomery, who was appointed as the fourth Anglican Bishop of Tasmania in 1899. He was interested in remote Aboriginal communities, and visited the island 10 times. However, after his departure, the church fell into disuse by around 1908. The old church was replaced by a new one in the 1940s.

More active intervention by the Tasmanian government began in 1912, with the passage of the Cape Barren Act 1912. The stated purpose of the act was to encourage the community to become self-sufficient, and the government also wanted islanders to move to Tasmania. In the 1920s, the mutton bird industry, which had driven the economy of the island, began to decline. In 1928, A. W. Burbury, a member of the Animals and Birds Protection Board (later politician), visited the island and recommended the removal of children as soon as they left school, to work as domestic servants or tradesmen on mainland Tasmania. This was not done, but from 1928 until 1980, the head teacher at the school was given an extra role, as "special constable". In this way, he could use existing child welfare legislation to take children for neglect, making them wards of state. Children who were under shared care of relatives, a normal practice among Aboriginal people, were classed as neglected. Under threat of losing their children, many families relocated to mainland Tasmania. By 1944, the population had fallen to 106.

The new Cape Barren Island Reserve Act 1945 made it even harder for Aboriginal people to obtain land. A 1946 government inquiry recommended that the Tasmanian Government "offer every encouragement to 'half-caste' families to leave the Reserve and settle in Tasmania, the objective being a gradual but eventually a total absorption of the half-castes into the white population". The reserve closed in 1951. From this time, the Tasmanian Government removed children from their parents, under a wider policy of assimilation, which was implemented in many parts of Australia over a number of decades, and resulted in what became known as the "Stolen Generations". From the 1970s, a series of government policy changes were implemented that gave greater recognition of the personal and social rights of individuals. The 1997 Bringing Them Home report gave accounts of children removed under these policies.

The island was gazetted as a locality of the Flinders Council in 1968.

On 10 May 2005, the Tasmanian government released Crown land on both Cape Barren and Clarke Island to be overseen by the local Aboriginal association, thus formally recognising Aboriginal ownership. This marked the first – and, as of November 2025, last – official handover of Crown land to an Aboriginal community in Tasmania.

== Description and demographics ==
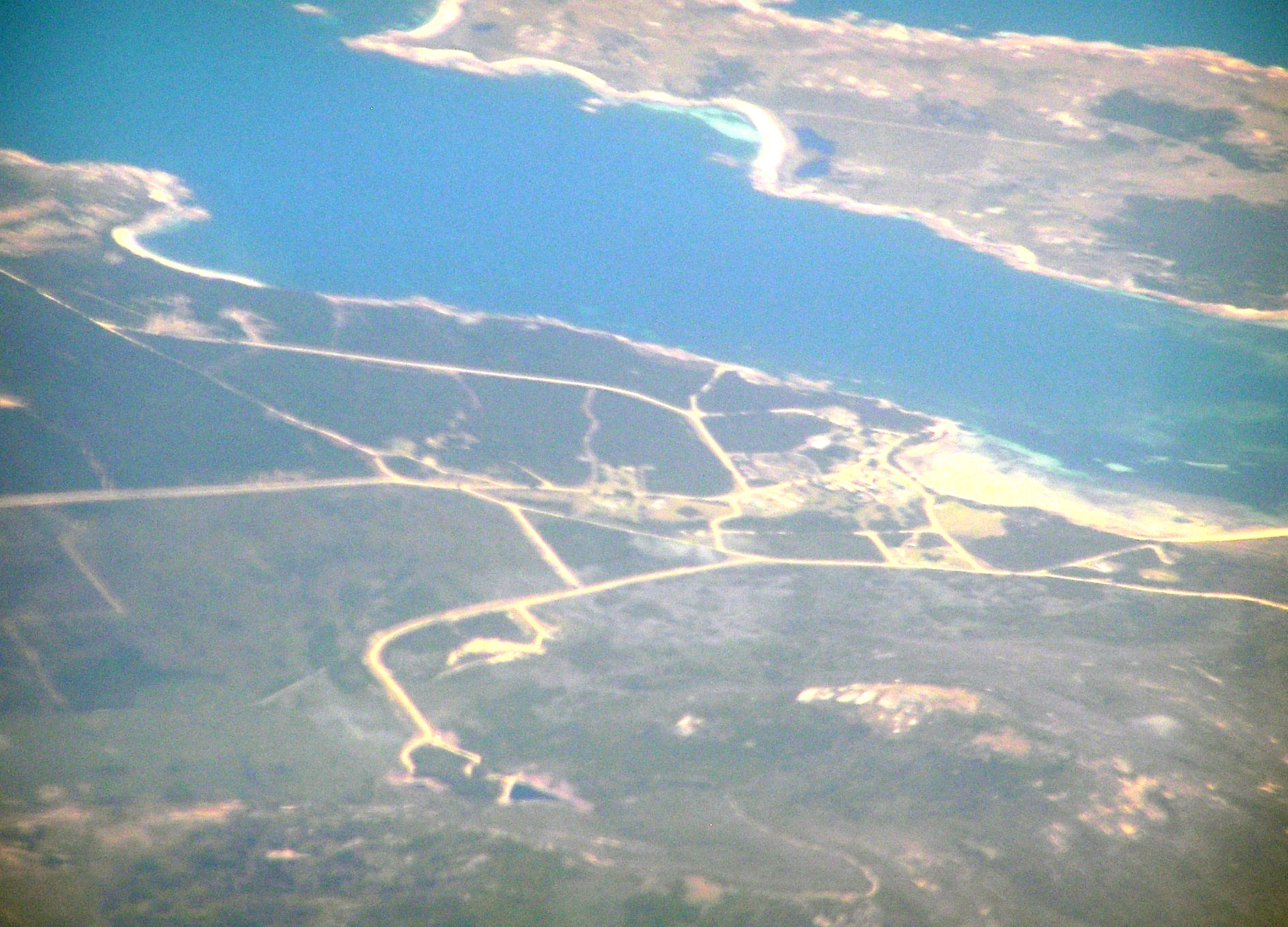
The settlement on Cape Barren Island, 2009

Cape Barren Island is the second-largest island of the Furneaux Group, with the larger Flinders Island to the north, and the smaller Clarke Island to the south. The highest point on the island is Mount Munro at 715 metres (2,346 ft).

The official name of the island, gazetted in February 2014, is "truwana / Cape Barren Island". truwana, in the local palawa kani Aboriginal language, means "sleeping water".

In 2007, the residents of Cape Barren Island consisted of an Aboriginal community of approximately 70 people. Most of the residents are descended from people of mixed European and Aboriginal descent, who had originally settled on several smaller nearby islands but relocated to Cape Barren Island in the late 1870s.

The 2021 census recorded 64 people on the island, with a median age of 51. Most residents live in a settlement called "The Corner", on the north-west coast. In November 2025, the number of permanent residents was estimated at around 80, most of whom live in The Corner.

== Governance ==
The island is within the Municipality of Flinders Island (Flinders Council) area. The Cape Barren Aboriginal Association (CBIAA), was established in 1972. It receives funding from the state and federal governments, and collaborates with the Flinders Council on some matters, such as the removal of garbage. The Association is responsible for the roads, water (supplied by two dams), electricity (generated from solar panels), and housing, as well as running the shop and post office. It also provides access to support services for health, cultural activities, and community welfare.

The truwana rangers practice cultural burning as part of a range of land management practices. The rangers created a fire management plan in collaboration with the Tasmania Fire Service.

== Facilities ==
Cape Barren island is a short boat trip away from Flinders Island. The roads are all unsealed. There are three mail flights each week.

There is a small school, in 2025 attended by 11 children from infants through to teenagers. Their day starts with a song in palawa kani, the resurrected Tasmanian Aboriginal language.

== Flora and fauna ==
The truwana rangers have found the rare Furneaux Burrowing Crayfish around the island, as well sighting native wasps and the Cave Cricket.

Some flowers on the island have been identified as threatened species.

=== Birds ===
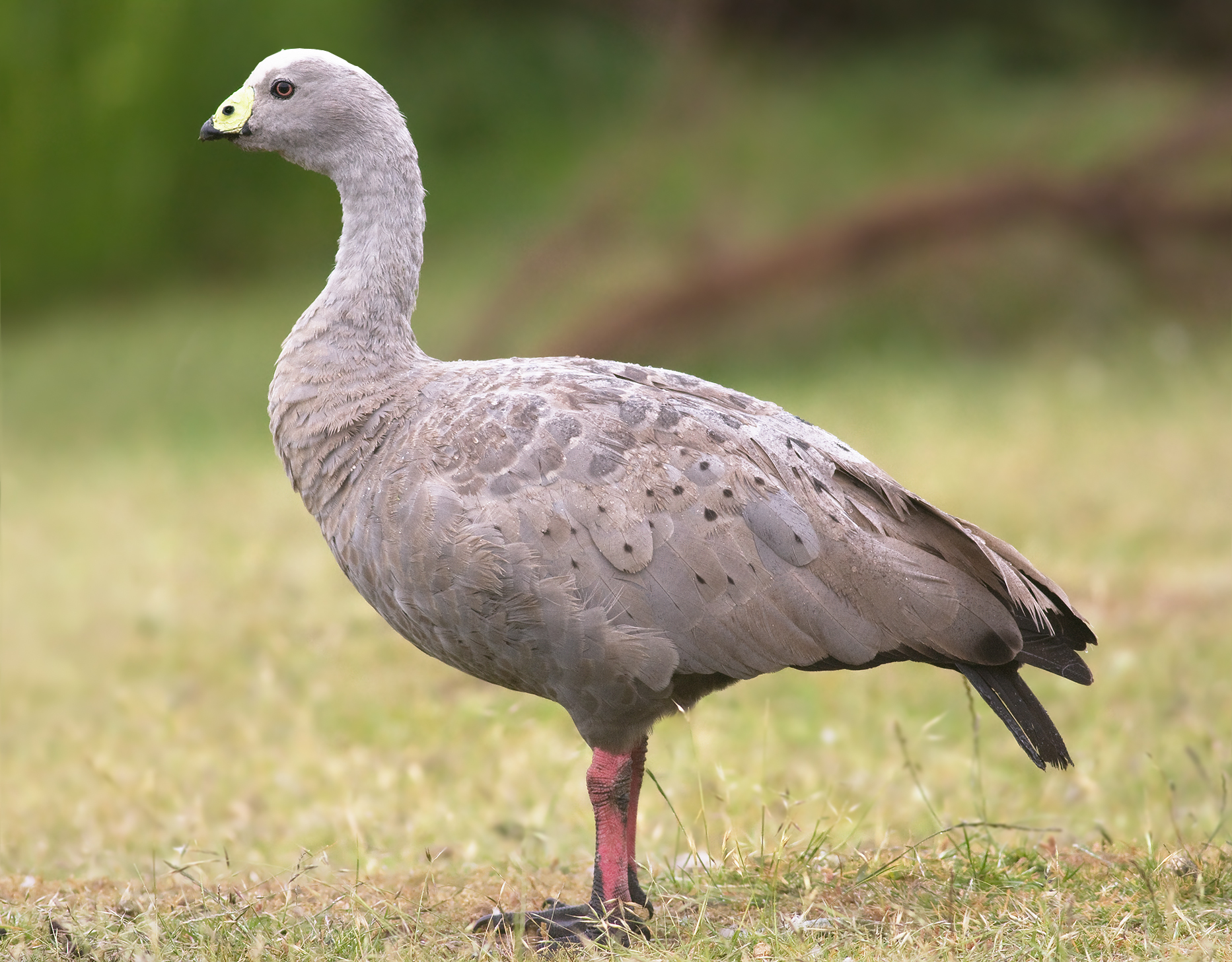
Cape Barren goose

The Cape Barren goose is found on the island, as well as the other islands in the Furneaux Group and at other places around coastal regions of Australia.

There are several important wetlands on the island, which provide habitat for wetland birds. The truwana rangers have discovered previously unknown birds.

On 16 November 1982, the east coast lagoons were recognised as being wetlands of international importance by being designated Ramsar site no.256. The site comprises a 4,370-hectare (10,800-acre) complex of shallow, saline lagoons among stretches of coastal dunes and beaches. It supports various plants of special botanical interest, including nationally rare species, as well as many waterbirds.

== See also ==
- List of islands of Tasmania
