= Hogan Island =

Island in Tasmania, Australia

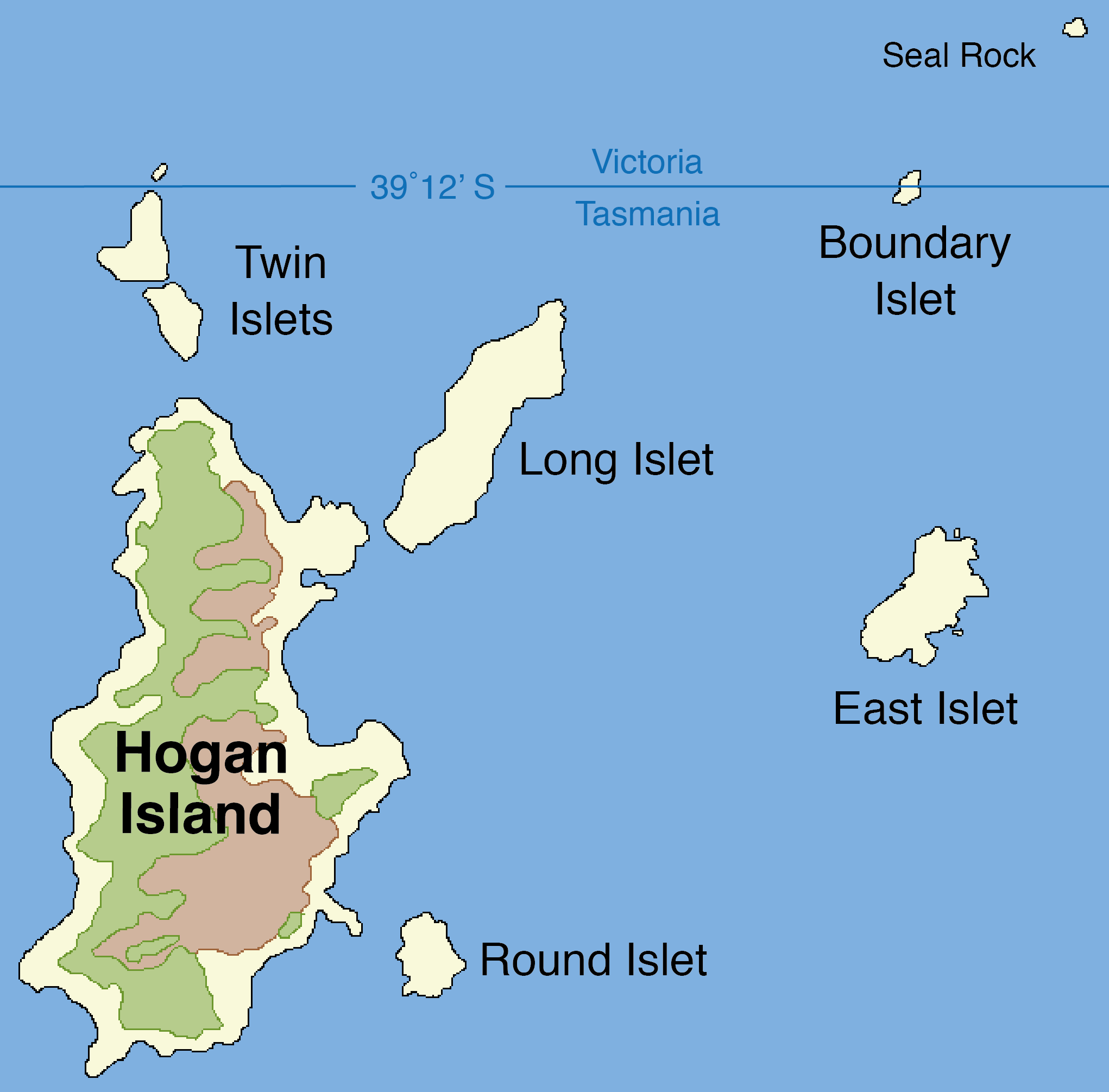
- Map of the Hogan Group, showing the Hogan Island (left).

- Location within Tasmania
- Etymology: Michael Hogan

Geography
- Location: Bass Strait
- Coordinates: 39°13′12″S 146°58′46″E
- Archipelago: Hogan Group
- Area: 232 ha (570 acres)
- Highest elevation: 116 m (381 ft)

Administration
- Australia
- State: Tasmania

Hogan Island, the largest island of the Hogan Group, is a 232-hectare (570-acre) granite island, located in northern Bass Strait, that lies between the Furneaux Group in north-east Tasmania, and Wilsons Promontory in Victoria, Australia. The island has a maximum elevation of 116 metres (381 ft) AHD.

== Features ==
Together with the other islands in the Hogan, Kent and Furneaux groups, Hogan Island formed part of a land bridge that connected Tasmania to mainland Australia until the end of the Pleistocene period. After the glacial period ended, the Hogan Group were the first islands to become isolated by rising sea levels.

The islands were named in 1802 by John Black, captain of the brig Harbinger, after Michael Hogan, the owner of his ship. The Harbinger was the first vessel to sail through Bass Strait after its discovery by Bass and Flinders. From that time, sealers inhabited, or regularly visited, the islands. After the mass killing of seals made sealing less viable, sealers turned to hunting kangaroos or farming. On 12 October 1900, the first lease for Hogan Island was recorded. While the original lease covered the entire island group, since 1959 it has only applied to Hogan Island and, from 1967, was held by B. R. Stackhouse, who used the island for cattle and sheep grazing. However, that activity ceased after causing considerable damage to the vegetation and the natural springs there.

== Climate ==
Hogan Island possesses an oceanic climate (Köppen: Cfb), with tepid summers and mild winters. Temperatures are moderated by its position in the Bass Strait and from frequent westerlies in all seasons. Average maxima vary from 21.8 °C (71.2 °F) in January to 13.0 °C (55.4 °F) in July, while average minima fluctuate between 15.3 °C (59.5 °F) in February and 8.8 °C (47.8 °F) in August. Mean precipitation is moderately low (averaging 619.6 mm (24.39 in) per annum), but rainfall is frequent, as Hogan Island receives 157.2 precipitation days annually (with a maximum frequency of rain in winter). Extreme temperatures have ranged from 39.3 °C (102.7 °F) on 29 January 2009 to 2.2 °C (36.0 °F) on 5 September 2017.

Climate data for Hogan Island (39.22°S 146.98°E, 116 m AMSL) (2003-2024 normals & extremes)
Month	Jan	Feb	Mar	Apr	May	Jun	Jul	Aug	Sep	Oct	Nov	Dec	Year
Record high °C (°F)	39.3 (102.7)	38.4 (101.1)	35.3 (95.5)	30.1 (86.2)	23.4 (74.1)	20.9 (69.6)	17.6 (63.7)	20.3 (68.5)	24.7 (76.5)	30.1 (86.2)	34.3 (93.7)	35.0 (95.0)	39.3 (102.7)
Mean daily maximum °C (°F)	21.8 (71.2)	21.4 (70.5)	20.5 (68.9)	18.2 (64.8)	15.7 (60.3)	13.8 (56.8)	13.0 (55.4)	13.3 (55.9)	14.7 (58.5)	16.3 (61.3)	18.3 (64.9)	20.0 (68.0)	17.3 (63.0)
Mean daily minimum °C (°F)	15.0 (59.0)	15.3 (59.5)	14.6 (58.3)	13.1 (55.6)	11.4 (52.5)	9.9 (49.8)	8.9 (48.0)	8.8 (47.8)	9.2 (48.6)	10.3 (50.5)	11.9 (53.4)	13.4 (56.1)	11.8 (53.3)
Record low °C (°F)	7.9 (46.2)	7.8 (46.0)	8.2 (46.8)	6.2 (43.2)	3.9 (39.0)	3.6 (38.5)	2.5 (36.5)	2.6 (36.7)	2.2 (36.0)	3.5 (38.3)	3.9 (39.0)	7.8 (46.0)	2.2 (36.0)
Average precipitation mm (inches)	39.2 (1.54)	35.4 (1.39)	45.3 (1.78)	51.6 (2.03)	57.6 (2.27)	62.2 (2.45)	70.4 (2.77)	70.1 (2.76)	51.7 (2.04)	46.7 (1.84)	45.3 (1.78)	40.5 (1.59)	619.6 (24.39)
Average precipitation days (≥ 0.2 mm)	10.0	8.4	11.2	13.9	15.5	15.0	16.8	17.1	15.0	12.6	11.1	10.6	157.2
Source: Bureau of Meteorology (2003-2024 normals & extremes)

== Fauna ==
Recorded breeding seabird and wader species include little penguin, short-tailed shearwater also known as the muttonbird, Pacific gull, silver gull and sooty oystercatcher. Reptiles present are the eastern blue-tongued lizard, metallic skink, three-lined skink, Bougainville's skink and White's skink. Feral goats were present for some time also.

== State border ==
The state border between Tasmania and Victoria lies in the Hogan Group and passes over land on the North East Islet, thus giving a land border between the two states. Before Victoria became a colony, it was agreed that New South Wales would have the sovereignty of all the land to Bass Strait, and Tasmania would have Bass Strait, except for waters near the coast. The original intention was that these Bass Strait Islands would be part of Tasmania, but the surveyed position for Wilson's Promontory was slightly off, and the border placed too far south at 39°12' S. Once this was discovered the Islet was renamed to Boundary Islet. The land border is 85 metres (279 ft) long.

== See also ==
- List of islands of Tasmania
