= Dover Island (Tasmania) =

Island in Tasmania, Australia

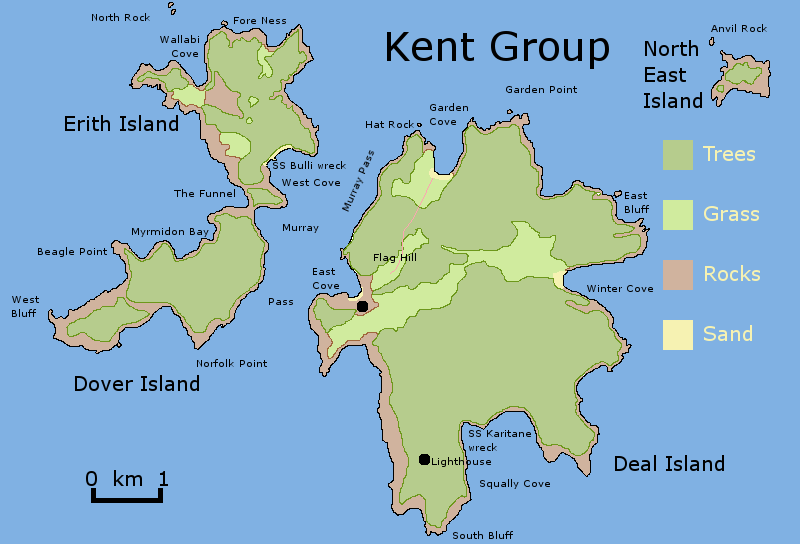
- The Dover Island, as located within the Kent Group.

- Location within Tasmania

Geography
- Location: Bass Strait
- Coordinates: 39°28′12″S 147°16′48″E
- Archipelago: Kent Group
- Area: 295 ha (730 acres)

Administration
- Australia
- State: Tasmania

Demographics
- Population: unpopulated

Dover Island, the third largest island in the Kent Group, is a densely vegetated and unpopulated 295-hectare (730-acre) granite island with steep slopes, located in the Bass Strait, lying off the north-east coast of Tasmania, between the Furneaux Group and Wilsons Promontory in Victoria, Australia.

The island is part of the Kent Group National Park, Tasmania's northernmost national park, which was gazetted in 2002. Unlike its companion islands, Deal and Erith, Dover has never been grazed by stock or cleared, so retaining its original cover of native vegetation and almost completely lacking exotic species.

== Flora and fauna ==
Dover is covered by low forest dominated by Drooping Sheoak (Allocasuarina verticillata). Recorded breeding seabird and wader species include little penguin, Pacific gull, and sooty oystercatcher.

== See also ==
- List of islands of Tasmania
