= John Murray (Australian explorer) =

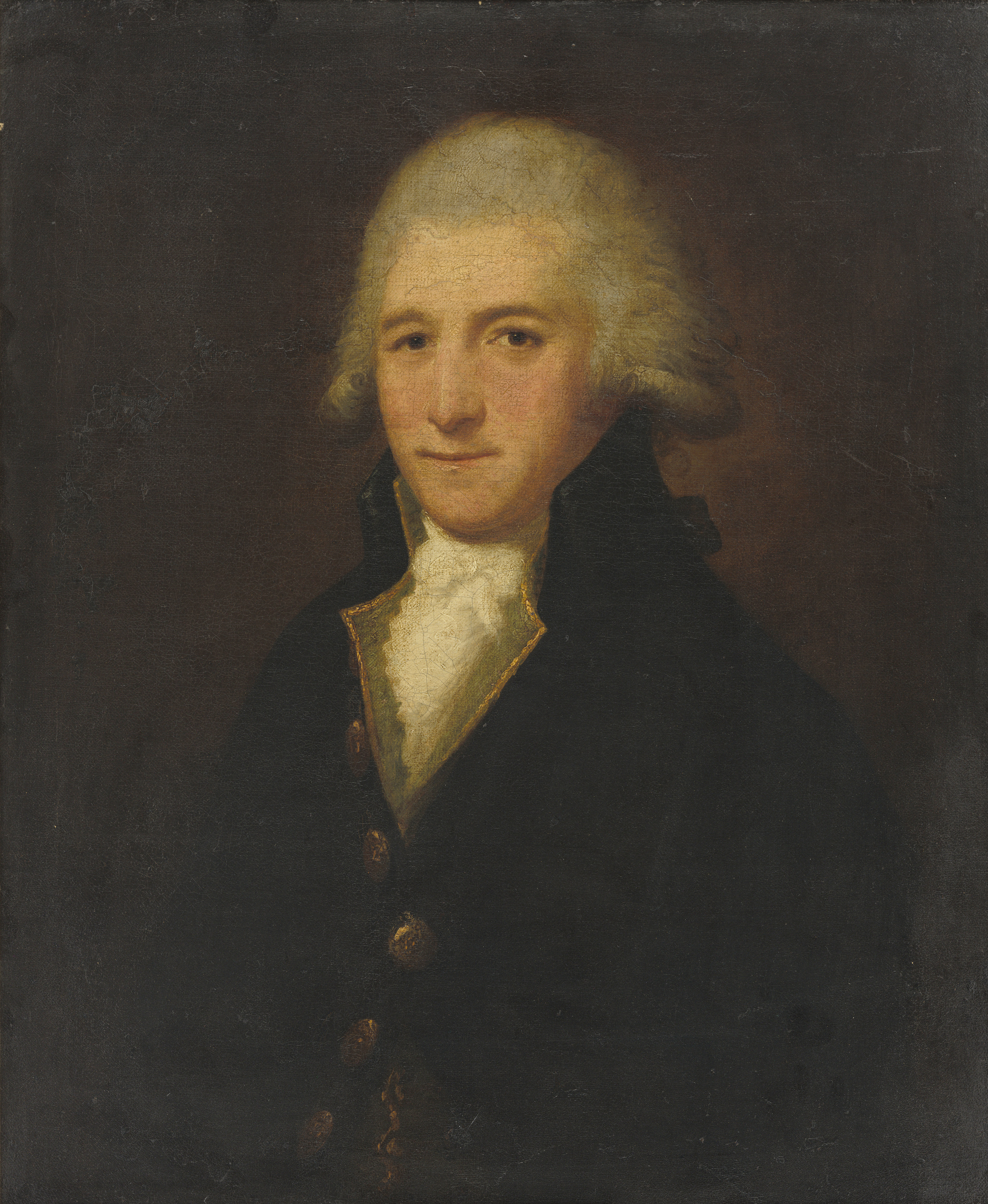
- Portrait of Captain John Murray, Royal Navy, ca. 1804, attributed to Hubnor
- Born: ca. 1775
- Died: ca. 1807
- Employer: Royal Navy
- Known for: Seaman and explorer in Australia. He was the first European to land in Port Phillip, the bay on which the cities of Melbourne and Geelong are situated.

John Murray (c. 1775 – c. 1807) was a seaman and explorer of Australia. He was the first European to land in Port Phillip, the bay on which the cities of Melbourne and Geelong are situated. He is notable for his explorations and surveying work in Victoria and New South Wales, including being the first European captain to enter Port Phillip Bay, then known as "Narrm-Narrm" by the local Aboriginal people, and exploring the area around present-day Melbourne.

== Early life ==
It is believed he was born in Edinburgh and began his naval career as an able seaman in 1789. He served as a midshipman in the Polyphemus from October 1794 to May 1797, as mate in the Apollo from May to December 1797, as second master and pilot of the Blazer from January to July 1798, and as mate of the Porpoise from October 1798 to July 1800. Later that year he passed his lieutenant's examination.

== Exploration of Australia ==
In November 1800, Murray arrived in New South Wales on the Porpoise. He accompanied James Grant, George Caley, Euranabie, and Worogan, as mate on the Lady Nelson while surveying Jervis Bay, Westernport Bay and the Hunter River in 1801. After his return to Sydney, Grant resigned his command, and in September Governor King appointed Murray as acting lieutenant and commander of the Lady Nelson.

After a voyage to Norfolk Island, Murray was instructed to continue the exploration of the southern Australian coastline. He set out from Sydney on 12 November for the Kent Group, where he successfully navigated and charted the passage between Deal and Erith Islands, which would later be named in his honor. In December, he undertook a survey of Western Port.

=== Exploration of present-day Melbourne ===
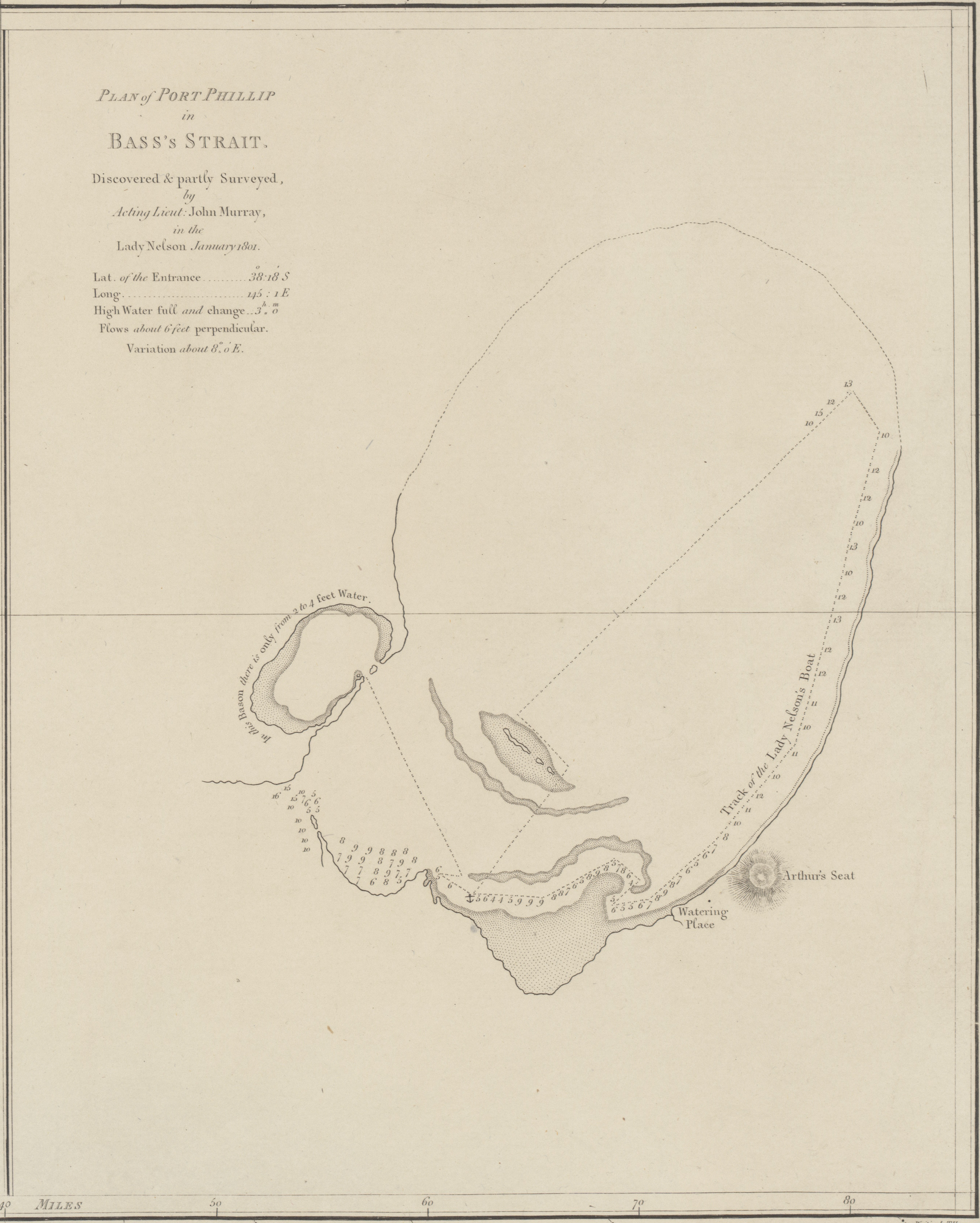
Plan of Port Phillip from Murray's survey of 1802.

On 4 January 1802, he sighted the entrance to Port Phillip, but decided it was too dangerous to navigate, so continued to survey the east coast of King Island. On 14 February 1802, he returned and entered Port Phillip for the first time, anchoring off what became the site of the quarantine station.

Monday, February 15th. P.M. Working up, the port with a very strong ebb against us, we however gained ground. The southern shore of this noble harbour is bold high land in general and not clothed as all the land at Western Point is with thick brush but with stout trees of various kinds and in some places falls nothing short, in beauty and appearance, of Greenwich Park. Away to the eastward at the distance of 20 miles the land is mountainous, in particular there is one very high mountain which in the meantime I named Arthur's Seat from its resemblance to a mountain of that name a few miles from Edinburgh...to the north-east by north, about 5 miles from the south shore lies a cluster of small rocky islands and all round them a shoal of sand; plenty of swans and pelicans were found on them when the boat was down, from which I named them Swan Isles. To the north-east by east there is an opening, and from our masthead no land could be seen in it. The northern shores are low with a sandy beach all along. At half-past 3 P.M. we got to anchor in a sandy cove in 7 fathoms water, bottom fine sand—Swan Isles bearing north-east by north distance 5 miles, a bold rocky point which I named Point Paterson east-south-east 1½ miles, a long sandy point named Point Palmer west, 1½ miles, and the nearest point of the shore south-west ½ of a mile distant.

— John Murray, Ships log Lady Nelson

Murray spent more than a month surveying the bay and naming landmarks including Arthur's Seat, named after the hill in his native Edinburgh. Murray chose to base the Lady Nelson off what is now known as Sorrento Beach.

=== Violent encounter with Aboriginal people ===
On 17 February, Murray wrote that his contingent went looking for and was approached by a group of 18 or 20 Aboriginal men and boys. The Aboriginal people were clothed in possum-skin clothes and carried baskets, spears, and 'stone mogos'. The crew danced with the Aboriginal people and exchanged goods. Murray offered them further gifts to exchange for their clothes and spears. The Aboriginal however, refused the offer to come aboard the boat and were curious about the crew's guns; they did not believe the guns were walking sticks as Murray said.

The next day the crew ate dinner and shared bread with the Aboriginal, and traded clothes for goods, though one Aboriginal man took back the items they had traded, which Murray ignored to keep 'good relations'. The crew inquired about water and shells to eat, but were reportedly ignored. Next, one of the crew, Brabyn, yelled out when they noticed a hidden man about to throw a spear at the crew, and a group of Aboriginal people with spears hidden behind a large tree. The spear barely missed crewman Moss, and the crew sitting with some of the Aboriginal people were immediately advanced upon by the attacking Aboriginal party as the Aboriginal people they were sitting with 'opened out to the right and left' leaving them open to the attacking party. The officer Bowen shot over their heads but only created a 'small panic', and so the crew kept shooting.

As the Aboriginal people retreated, two were shot by the crew, likely mortally. One was shot twice in the spine, and another was shot once in the side and once through the arm as Bowen and three crewmen grappled him. The grappled man escaped, and the crew fired the remainder of their guns before following the trail of his blood. likely fatal wound. During the chase, Murray watched with a spyglass and fired the ships' carronades loaded with roundshot and grapeshot at the Aboriginal people to panic them, though he says this was almost certain to have done no damage.

Murray wrote after the incident:

"Thus did this treachery and unprovoked attack meet with its just punishment and at the same time taught us a useful lesson to be more cautious in future. With respect to the size of these natives they are much the same as at Sydney, their understanding better though, for they easily made out our signs when it answered their purposes or inclination. When it did not they could be dull enough. They were all clothed in opossum skins and in each basket a certain quantity of gum was found. Not the least sign of a canoe has been seen. I conclude they live entirely inland, and if we may judge from the number of their fires and other marks this part of the country is not thin of inhabitants. Their spears are of various kinds and all of them more dangerous than any I have yet seen. The workmanship of their dresses, their lines and baskets are far from despicable, their mogo or stone axes are such as common at Sydney."

While one author identifies these people as Boonwurrung, it is unclear from Murray's journal if they were Boonwurrung, Gunai/Kurnai, or Wurundjeri or a mixture of both. The motive for the attack is unclear in Murray's writings.

Over the next few days they searched the bush for people but only found their discarded European clothes.

On 8 March, he claimed the bay and named it Port King, which Governor King later renamed Port Phillip. At the time the bay was known as Narrm-narrm to the Boonwurrung.

After Murray's return to Sydney on 23 March, King sent a recommendation to England that Murray be commissioned as a lieutenant.

=== Further travels ===
On 22 July 1802, Murray set off again in the Lady Nelson, which had become a supply ship accompanying HMS Investigator, commanded by Matthew Flinders, in the circumnavigation of Australia. Due to her old sails and a need for caulking, she proved unfit and on 17 October, when they were off the Cumberland Islands, Flinders ordered Murray to return to Sydney.

In April 1803, Governor King received a dispatch informing him that the Navy Board had refused to give Murray a full commission because he had given false details of previous service in England and had not served the required full six years as had claimed. Reluctantly, King was required to remove Murray from command of the Lady Nelson. However, he retained a good opinion of him, as evidenced by his later letters to Joseph Banks. Murray returned to England in the Glatton in May 1803.

== Later life ==
Murray's chart of the south coast of England between Worthing and Beachy Head, 1806

There is little record of Murray's later life. He appears as the surveyor of several English coastal charts between 1804 and 1810, which suggests he succeeded in repairing his reputation with the Admiralty, on behalf of which the maps were made. His date of death is unknown. There is record of a small vessel, The Herring, being lost in November 1814 under the command of a Lieutenant John Murray, though it is not certain if he was the same person because the name is relatively common.

== See also ==
- Lady Nelson
