= South West Isle (Tasmania) =

Island in Tasmania, Australia

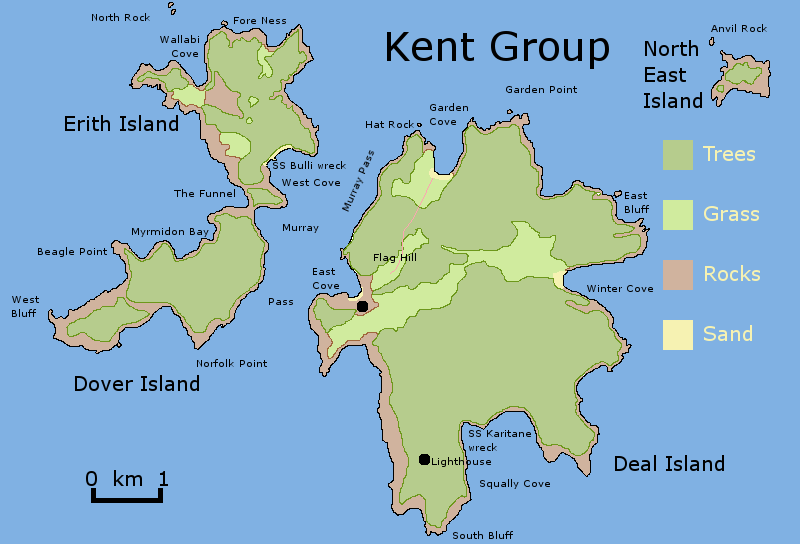
- The South West Isle, as located within the Kent Group.

- Location within Tasmania

Geography
- Location: Bass Strait
- Coordinates: 39°31′12″S 147°07′12″E
- Archipelago: Kent Group
- Area: 19.1 ha (47 acres)
- Highest elevation: 120 m (390 ft)

Administration
- Australia
- State: Tasmania

Demographics
- Population: unpopulated

The South West Isle, part of the Kent Group, is an unpopulated 19.09-hectare (47.2-acre) granite island, located in the Bass Strait, lying off the north-east coast of Tasmania, between the Furneaux Group and Wilsons Promontory in Victoria, Australia.

The island has a peak elevation of 120 metres (390 ft) and is contained within the Kent Group National Park, Tasmania's northernmost national park, which was gazetted in 2002.

== Fauna ==
Recorded breeding seabird, wader and waterbird species include little penguin, short-tailed shearwater, fairy prion, common diving-petrel, Pacific gull, silver gull, sooty oystercatcher and Cape Barren goose. Reptiles present are the metallic skink, Bougainville's skink and White's skink.

== See also ==
- List of islands of Tasmania
- Protected areas of Tasmania
