= North East Isle =

Island in Tasmania, Australia

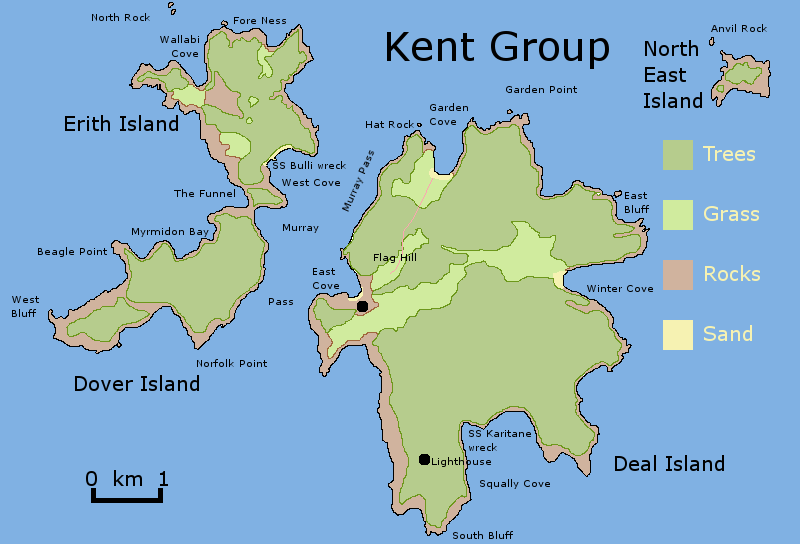
- The North East Isle, as located within the Kent Group.

- Location within Tasmania

Geography
- Location: Bass Strait
- Coordinates: 39°26′24″S 147°22′12″E
- Archipelago: Kent Group
- Area: 32.62 ha (80.6 acres)
- Highest elevation: 125 m (410 ft)

Administration
- Australia
- State: Tasmania

Demographics
- Population: unpopulated

The North East Isle, part of the Kent Group, is an unpopulated 32.62-hectare (80.6-acre) granite island, located in the Bass Strait, lying off the north-east coast of Tasmania, between the Furneaux Group and Wilsons Promontory in Victoria, Australia.

The island has a peak elevation of 125 metres (410 ft) above mean sea level and is contained within the Kent Group National Park.

== Fauna ==
Recorded breeding seabird and wader species include little penguin, short-tailed shearwater, fairy prion, common diving-petrel, Pacific gull and sooty oystercatcher. Also present are the white-footed dunnart and White's skink.

== See also ==
- List of islands of Tasmania
