= Deal Island =

Deal Island may refer to:

- Deal Island, Maryland, USA
- Deal Island (Tasmania), Australia
