= Judgement Rock =

Judgement Rock may refer to:

- Judgement Rocks, Tasmania, Australia
- Judgement Rock (novel), 2002 novel by Joanna Murray-Smith
