= Norfolk (1801 brig) =

Great Britain
- Name: Harbinger
- Owner: 1797:Michel Hogan; 1801:Government of New South Wales
- Builder: Quebec
- Launched: 24 July 1797
- Renamed: Norfolk
- Fate: Wrecked 25 March 1802

General characteristics
- Tons burthen: 56, or 58 (bm)
- Sail plan: Brig
- Complement: 1800:20; 1802: 8
- Armament: 1798: 2 × 2-pounder guns; 1800:6 guns

Norfolk was built in Quebec in 1797 and registered in London in 1797 as Harbinger. In 1801 the Colonial government in New South Wales purchased her and renamed her Norfolk. She was Australia's first war vessel, but was wrecked in 1802 at Matavai Bay, Tahiti.

== Career ==
Harbinger was re-registered at London on 16 October 1797.Harbinger first appeared in Lloyd's Register in 1797 with Chapman, master, M. Hogan, owner, and trade London–Cape of Good Hope.

In 1801 Harbinger, under the command of Captain John Black, was the second vessel to sail through Bass Strait en route to Port Jackson, Australia. She reached the coast near Cape Otway on 1 January 1801, then veered sharply south-west to the north-western tip of Governor King's Island (now King Island), which Black named after the Governor of New South Wales, Philip Gidley King. She then sailed easterly towards Wilsons Promontory. Proceeding around the tip of the promontory, Black discovered the Hogan Group, which he named after the ship's owner Michael Hogan. Harbinger arrived in Port Jackson on 12 January 1801 from the Cape.

Hogan offered Harbinger for sale and Governor King purchased her in April 1801 for £700. (Hogan had asked £1500, and Governor King agreed that £700 undervalued her, but that was all he could offer.) King wanted her to carry supplies to Norfolk Island and bring back salt pork. He therefore named her Norfolk. She performed such a voyage and returned to Port Jackson.

On 1 November Governor King commissioned her as a war vessel under the command of Captain William House. She therefore became Australia's first war vessel. King then sent her to Tahiti to bring back salt pork.

== Loss ==
The ship was visiting Matavai Bay in Tahiti when a hurricane struck on 25 March 1802. Captain William House ran Norfolk aground to avoid her being smashed on the rocks. She grounded and the crew escaped to safety. The hull was salvaged but as it was being towed to another island it sank. HMS Porpoise later retrieved her crew.
