= East Island (Tasmania) =

Island in Tasmania, Australia

Coordinates: 39°12′52″S 147°01′21″E

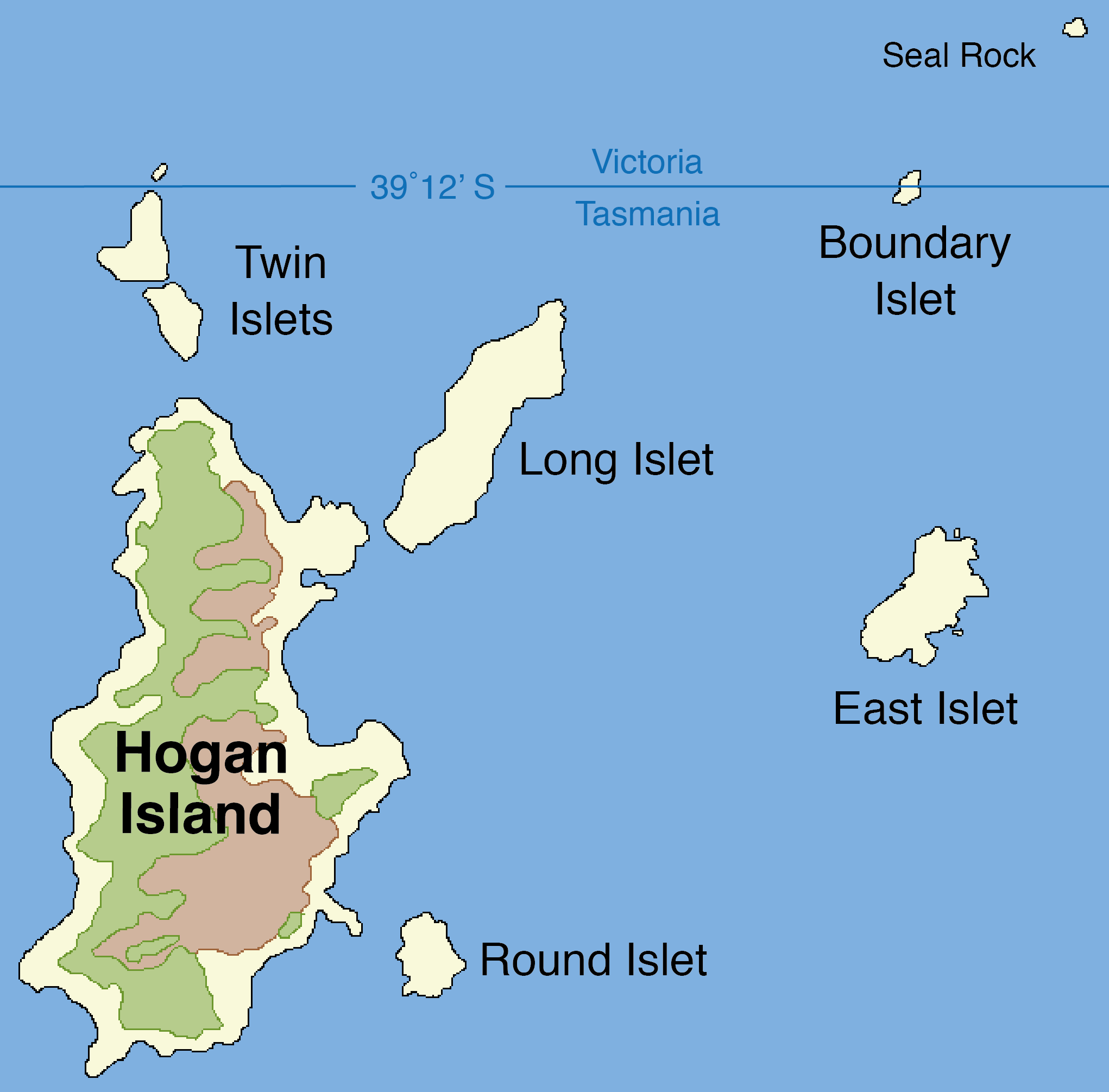
Map of the Hogan Group of islands showing East Islet

East Island is a granite island, with an area of 12.42 ha, in south-eastern Australia. It is part of Tasmania’s Hogan Group, lying in northern Bass Strait between the Furneaux Group and Wilsons Promontory in Victoria.

== Fauna ==
Recorded breeding seabird and wader species include little penguin, short-tailed shearwater, fairy prion, common diving petrel, Pacific gull and sooty oystercatcher. Reptiles present include White's skink and metallic skink.

== Wrecks ==
- Daphne (brig) in 1818.

== See also ==
- List of islands of Tasmania
