= William Hovell =

Australian explorer (1786–1875)

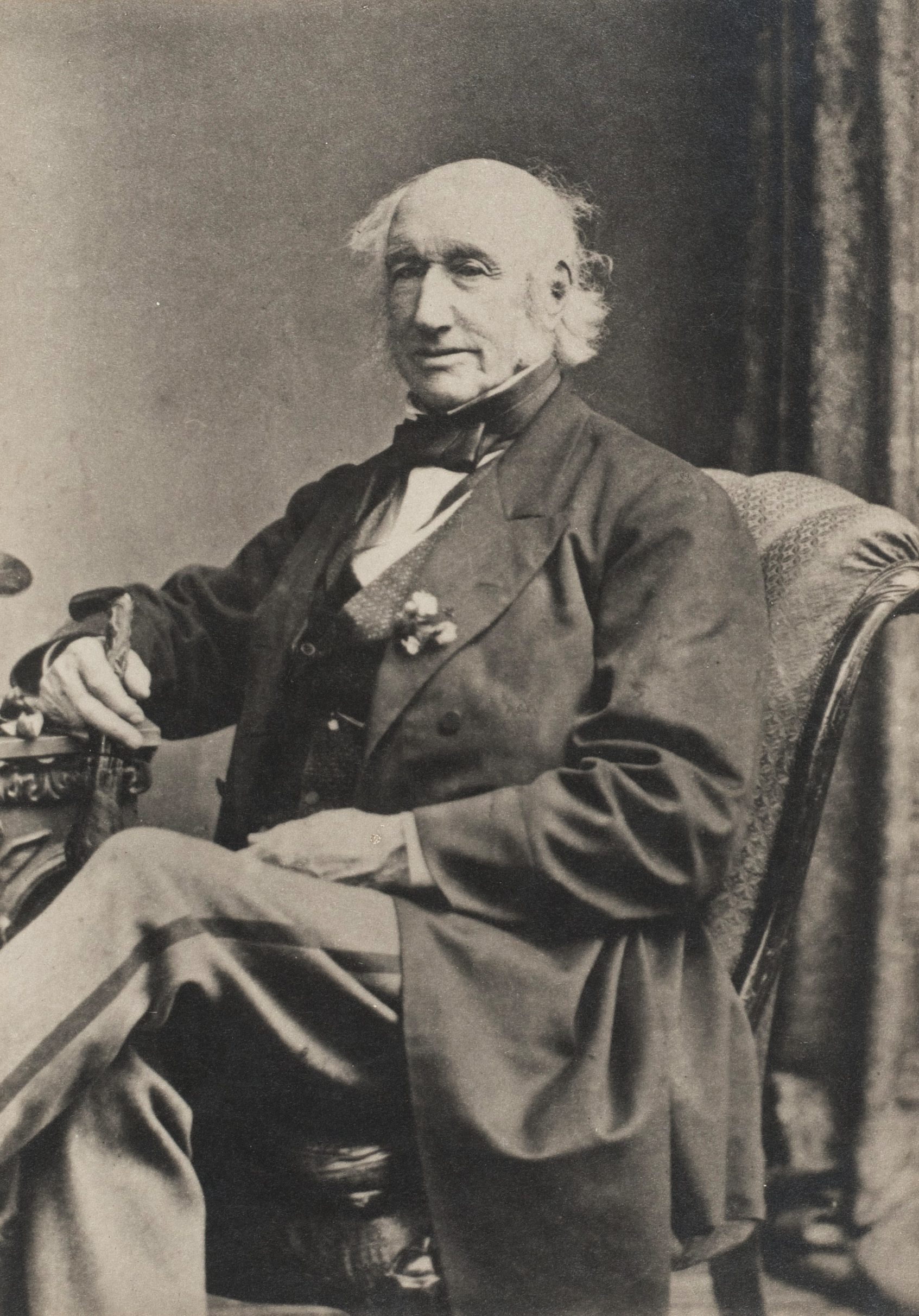
- Australian explorer Captain William Hilton Hovell, July 1871
- Born: William Hilton Hovell; 26 April 1786; Yarmouth, Norfolk, England
- Died: 9 November 1875 (aged 89); Sydney, NSW, Australia
- Known for: Explorer

William Hilton Hovell (26 April 1786 – 9 November 1875) was an English explorer of Australia. With Hamilton Hume, he made an 1824 overland expedition from Sydney to Port Phillip (near the site of present-day Melbourne), and later explored the area around Western Port.

== Early life ==
Hovell was born in Yarmouth, Norfolk, England. His father was captain and part owner of a vessel trading to the Mediterranean, which, during a voyage in 1794, was captured by the French and taken into a port, where he became a prisoner of war for two years. William, when only 10 years of age, went to sea to earn his living. After going through the hard life of a foremast hand, at 20 years of age he was mate of Zenobia bound to Peru, and two years later he was a mercantile marine captain of the Juno bound to Rio Janeiro, and others. He decided to come to Australia, arriving at Sydney New South Wales by the ship Earl Spencer, with his wife Esther née Arndell (daughter of the surgeon Thomas Arndell), and two children, a boy and a girl, on 9 October 1813.

In June 1816, while in command of The Brothers he was shipwrecked in the Kent Group, Bass Strait, and along with his crew of eight survived for 10 weeks on the wheat from their cargo that was washed up, before being rescued by the Spring. In 1819 he settled on the land near Sydney and did some exploring in a southerly direction; he reached the Burragorang Valley in 1823.

== Explorer ==
In 1824, Governor Sir Thomas Brisbane asked Hovell to join with Hamilton Hume to undertake the exploration of what is now southern New South Wales and Victoria. Hovell had little bush experience, but had great experience as a navigator.

The planned official expedition did not eventuate.

Four days later impassable country was reached. The party spent three days attempting to cross the Great Dividing Range at Mt Disappointment but were thwarted. Hume shifted direction to the West then reached lower land at the future township of Broadford on 12 December where they camped. Hume headed towards low ranges to the South and found a pass in that direction next day. He led the party across the Dividing Range at Hume’s Pass, Wandong and on 16 December 1824 reached Port Phillip Bay at Bird Rock, Point Lillias adjacent to the future Geelong. Hovell claimed that he measured their longitude on the same day but in reality he read it off the sketch map that they had drafted themselves during the trip. Hovell admitted in 1867 that he did not take any longitude measurements and blamed Hume for it. Prior to this admission, Dr William Bland, who wrote the first book on the journey in 1831, invented the myth that Hovell made an error of one degree in longitude in order to protect him. The party turned back towards New South Wales on 18 December. Hume chose to travel more to the west to avoid the mountainous country and save considerable time. This was a sound decision. On 16 January 1825, just as their flour ran out, and then two days later the safety of Hume's station at Gunning.

== Late life ==
Hume and Hovell each wrote public documents with contradicting claims on the conduct of their expedition. Reports reached Hume that Hovell was credited for the discovery of Geelong.

Hovell died in Sydney on 9 November 1875 and was buried at Goulburn, survived by a son.

== Archives at ==
Remarks on a journey from Lake George, Lat. 35 deg. 5 min., Long. - , towards Western Port, 2 October-21 December 1824 by William Hilton Hovell. Journal in a small field notebook, in which Hovell describes the journey with Hume to Port Phillip. State Library of New South Wales, online copy Safe 1/32b

== Honours ==
- The road William Hovell Drive which connects the districts of Belconnen to North Canberra in Canberra, Australia is named after him.
- In 1976 Hume and Hovell were honoured on a postage stamp bearing their portraits issued by Australia Post
- Lake William Hovell on the King River is named after him.
- William Hovell Drive, between Matthew Flinders Avenue and John Edgcumbe Way, in Endeavour Hills, Victoria, is named after him.
- Hovells Creek near Geelong is named after him. The creek flows through the suburb of Lara, with its mouth at Limeburners Lagoon, flowing into Corio Bay from the north.
- Hovells Creek in New South Wales is also named after him. The creek rises as Phils Creek and has confluence with the Lachlan River near Darbys Falls. It passes near a small settlement called Graham in the Hilltops Local Government Region.
