= Marquis Cornwallis (1789 ship) =

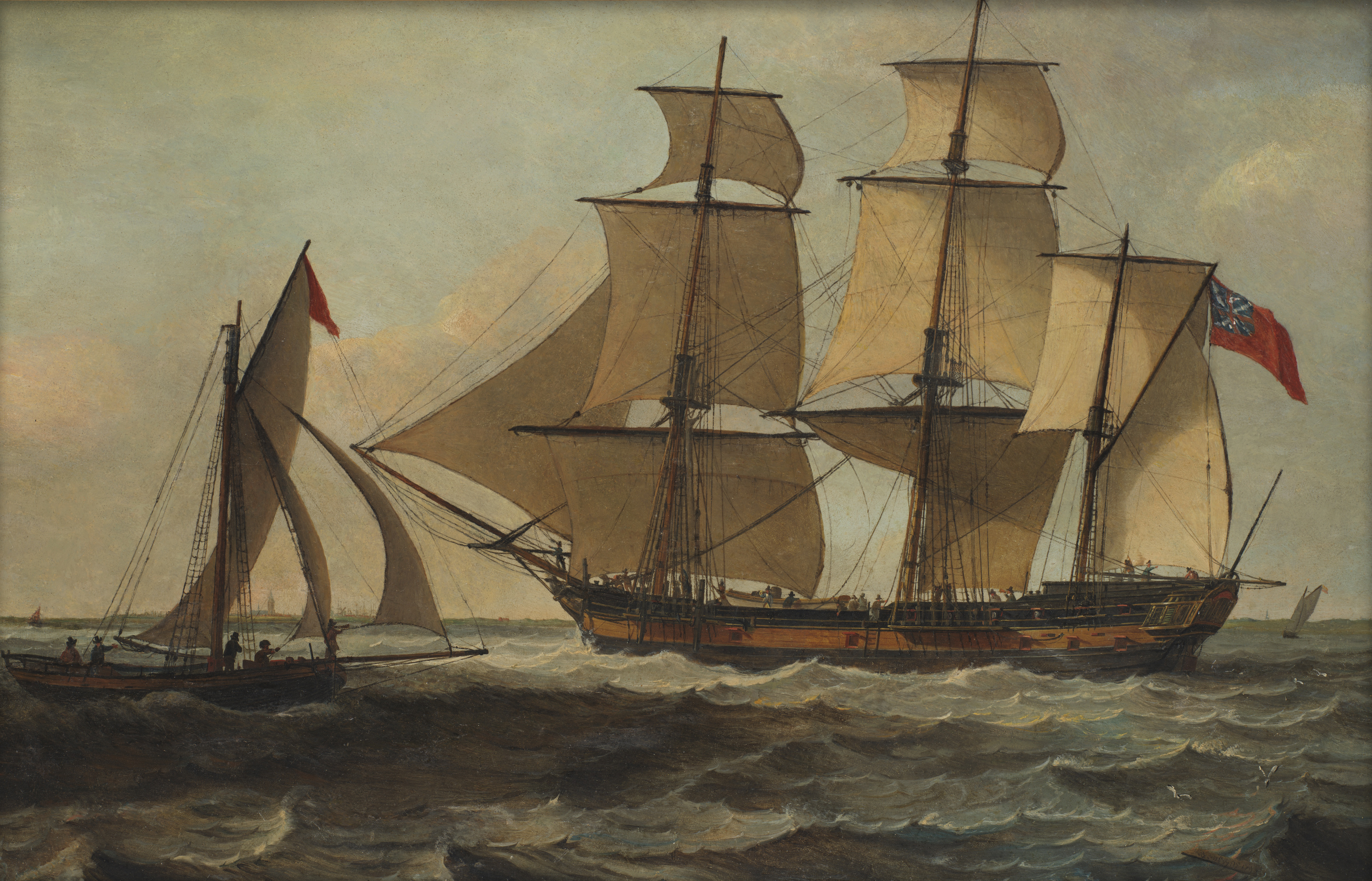
- Marquis Cornwallis (1793) by Frans Balthazar Solvyns

History

Great Britain
- Name: Marquis Cornwallis
- Namesake: Charles Cornwallis, 1st Marquess Cornwallis
- Owner: Lennox & Co.
- Builder: Michael Hogan & Gabriel Gillett, Calcutta
- Launched: 1789, or 1791
- Fate: Last listed in Lloyd's Register in 1806

General characteristics
- Tons burthen: 586, or 634, or 654, (bm)
- Length: 121 feet 0 inches (36.9 m) (overall); 95 feet 8 inches (29.2 m)
- Beam: 33 feet 11 1/2 inches (10.4 m)
- Depth of hold: 17 feet 0 inches (5.2 m)
- Complement: 40
- Armament: 14 × 6-pounder guns, or 16 × 6-pounder guns (Note: Marquis Cornwallis was pierced for 30 guns, with five ports on her middle deck and ten on her upper deck.)

Marquis Cornwallis was a merchantman built in Calcutta in 1789 or 1791. She made one voyage transporting convicts in 1796 from Ireland to Australia. The voyage was marred by mutiny that resulted in the death of 11 convicts. Marquis Cornwallis then made a voyage for the British East India Company (EIC) as an "extra ship", sailing from India back to Britain.

== Career ==
Michael Hogan purchased this ship in 1791. Registered as Il Netunno, she traded between India and Europe under the Genoese flag to avoid the East India Company monopoly. In 1794 Hogan registered the ship as Marquis Cornwallis under the British flag. She was admitted to the Registry of Great Britain on 23 September 1794. At that time Perry, Blackwall, measured her.

On 18 April 1795, William Richardson received a letter of marque.

Under Michael Hogan's command, Marquis Cornwallis departed Cork, Ireland on 9 August 1795, and arrived at Port Jackson on 11 February 1796.

When Marquis Cornwallis left Cork she was transporting 163 male and 70 female convicts. She also carried 36 soldiers of the New South Wales Corps, and their families. About a month into the voyage Hogan had to put down a mutiny, with the result that seven convicts and a sergeant, one of the mutineers, died of their injuries, including flogging. Marquis Cornwallis then stayed for almost a month at the Cape, re-provisioning. In all, 11 male convicts died during the course of the voyage.

She departed Port Jackson on 15 May 1796 for Norfolk Island, where Hogan sold his wares. On 18 June Marquis Cornwallis left Norfolk for Madras and Calcutta, having added, with Governor Hunter's permission, four 6-pounder guns and 140 cannonballs that had been salvaged from the wreck of Sirius.

Marquis Cornwallis sailed to Papua New Guinea and New Britain from Norfolk Island via the Coral and the Solomon Sea. Hogan claimed, on 6 July, to have seen a great cloud of black, sulfurous smoke on the north-east coast of Bougainville Island. Although there are no volcanoes at the coordinates Hogan gave, many later charts gave a "Cornwallis volcano" as a landmark. He then passed between Flores and Sumbawa on a route that took Marquis Cornwallis along Java's southern coast.

In India Marquis Cornwallis received a new captain with John Roberts replacing Hogan. She then made a voyage under the auspices of the EIC. She was at Calcutta on 9 December, and at Saugor on 8 January 1797. She reached Madras on 27 January, the Cape on 12 April, and St Helena on 19 May. She arrived at the Downs on 25 July.

Marquis Cornwallis made a second voyage to Australia, carrying cattle to Sydney from the Cape of Good Hope. She arrived in Sydney in October 1798.

Lloyd's Register for 1799 shows Marquis Cornwallis under the ownership of Lennox & Co., with C. Mullion as master. Her trade is listed as London-India. This entry continue essentially unchanged through 1806. She leaves the records thereafter.

== See also ==
- Hall, Barbara (2000), A desperate set of villains: the convicts of the Marquis Cornwallis, Ireland to Botany Bay 1796, B. Hall, ISBN 978-0-646-39361-2
