= John Palmer (1814 schooner) =

Schooner wrecked in 1818 in the Bass Strait

John Palmer was a schooner of 37 tons (bm) that J. & W. Jenkins constructed in Cockle Bay, Sydney in 1814; she was owned by D. H. Smith of Sydney, and registered there. She was wrecked with loss of life on 23 November 1819 in the Kent Group in Bass Strait.

In November 1819 John Palmer, Captain Bastian, sailed from Launceston to Bass Strait, Tasmania, on a sealing trip. On her way she arrived on 23 November at the site of the shipwrecked Daphne at East Island in the Kent Group. There John Palmer picked up three passengers from Daphne, including Emma Hook, and a lascar seaman. For reasons unknown the ship also picked up a bag of coin containing 400 pounds from Daphne. As John Palmer attempted to beat out of the bay she was driven onto the rocks and became a total wreck. Emma Hook drowned, but the remaining sailors and passengers made it to shore. There they awaited rescue by Captain Howard on Governor Sorrell.
