= Long Islet (Tasmania) =

Island of Tasmania, Australia

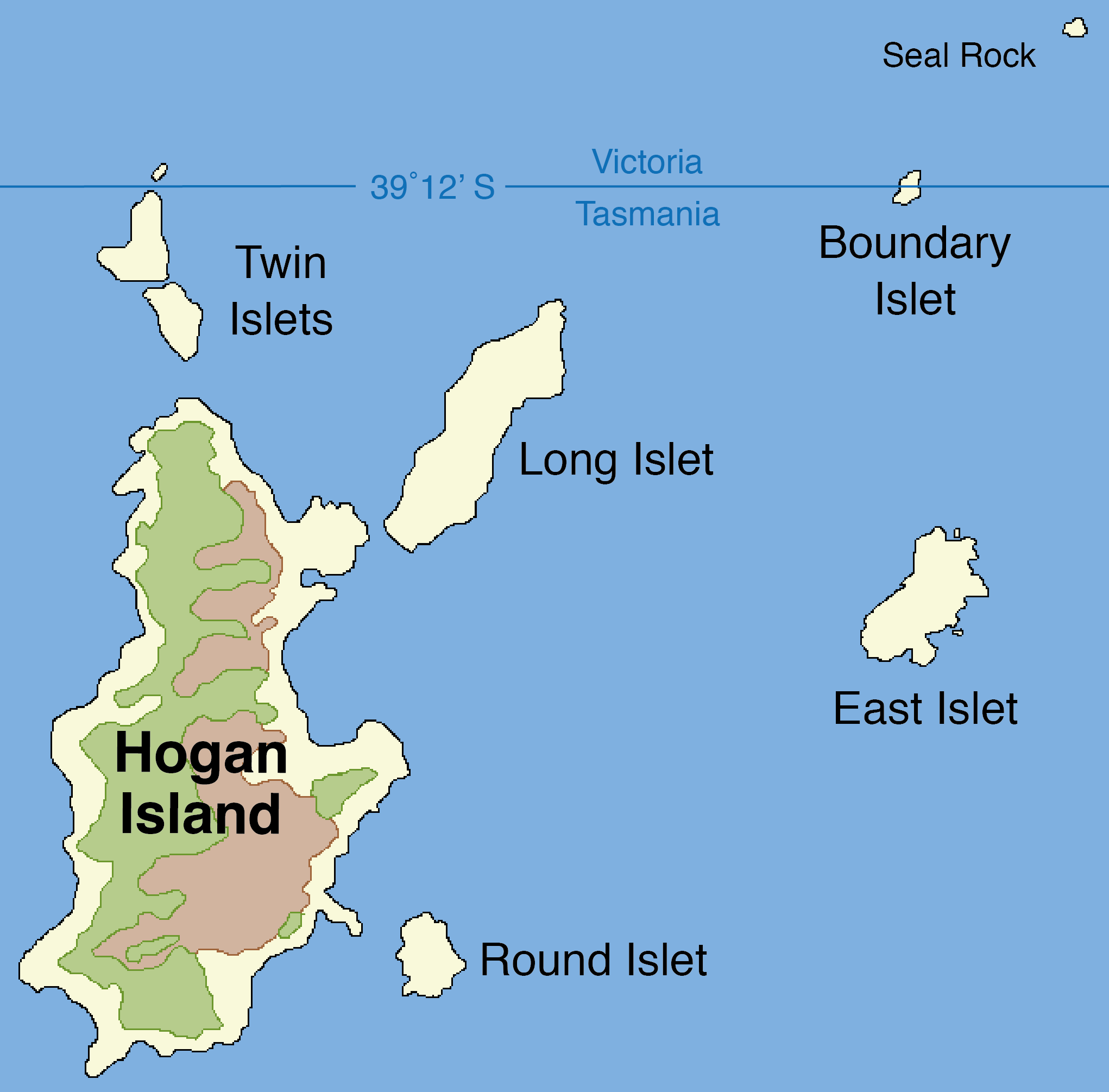
- Map of the Hogan Group showing Long Islet.

- Location within Tasmania

Geography
- Location: Bass Strait
- Coordinates: 39°12′00″S 147°00′00″E
- Archipelago: Hogan Group
- Area: 22.85 ha (56.5 acres)

Administration
- Australia
- State: Tasmania

The Long Islet, part of the Hogan Group, is a 22.85-hectare (56.5-acre) unpopulated long, narrow granite island located in northern Bass Strait, lying north of the Furneaux Group in Tasmania and south of Wilsons Promontory in Victoria, in south-eastern Australia.

== Fauna ==
Recorded breeding seabird and wader species include little penguin, short-tailed shearwater, Pacific gull, silver gull, and sooty oystercatcher. White's skink is present.

== See also ==
- List of islands of Tasmania
