= Brothers (1816 ship) =

Schooner wrecked in Bass Strait, Tasmania

History
- Name: Brothers
- Fate: Wrecked 1816

General characteristics
- Tonnage: 40 tons
- Sail plan: Schooner

Brothers was a 40-ton schooner wrecked in Bass Strait, Tasmania in 1816. She was under the command of Captain William Hilton Hovell. On 25 June 1816 the ship was anchored near the Kent Group in Bass Strait when an easterly gale broke her cables drove her ashore. Her cargo of twenty tons of salt and 800 bushels of wheat were lost overboard. One seaman, Daniel Wheeler, was drowned. For ten weeks the survivors lived on wheat washed ashore and whatever else they could scavenge until the brig, Spring, under the command of Captain Bunster, rescued them. The survivors arrived in Sydney on 6 September 1816.
