= Twin Islets =

Island in Tasmania, Australia

Coordinates: 39°12′8″S 146°59′2″E

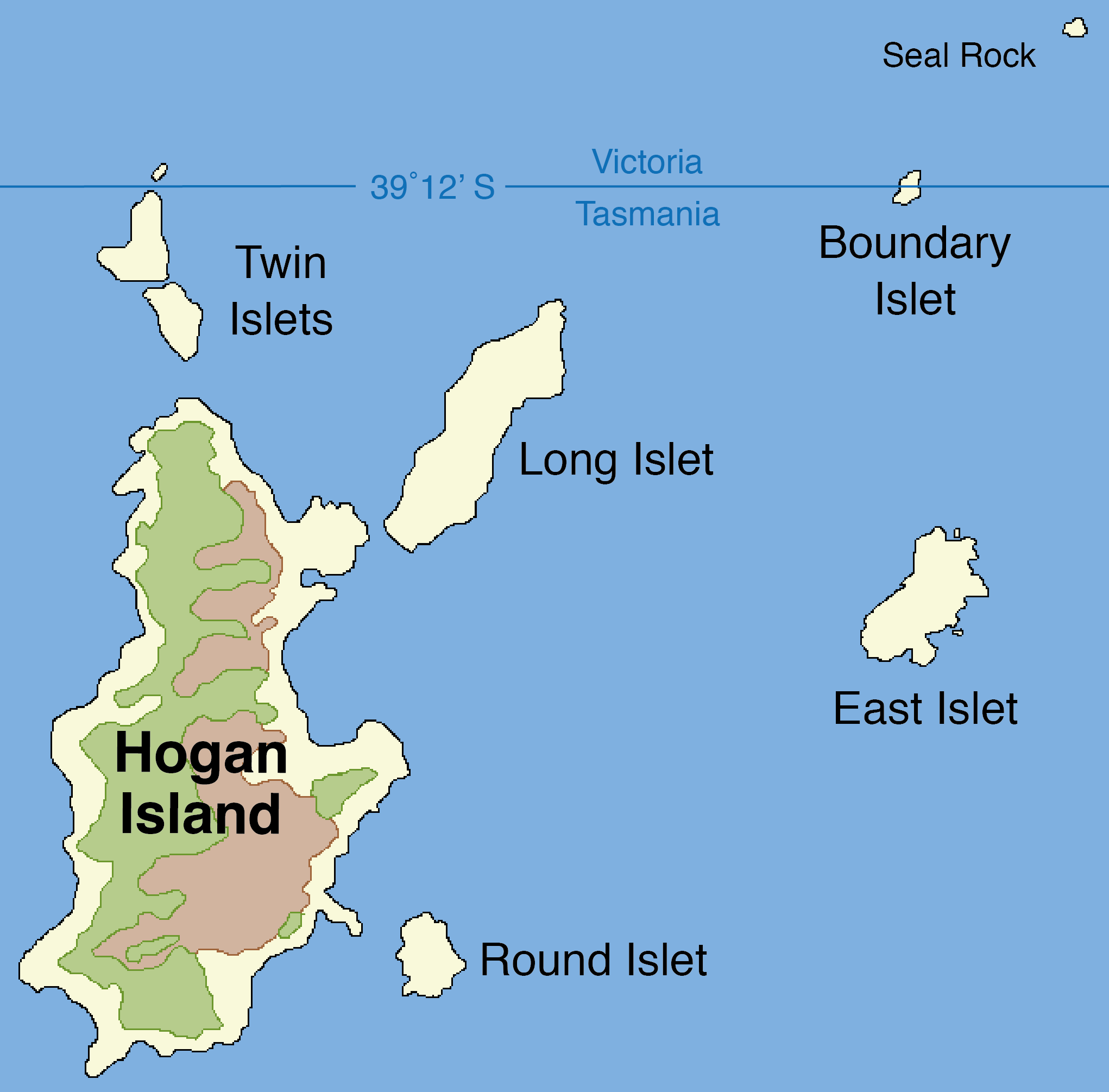
Map of the Hogan Group of islands showing Twin Islets

The Twin Islets form a close pair of small, steep-sided, granite islands, with a combined area of 5.61 ha, in south-eastern Australia. They are part of Tasmania’s Hogan Group, lying in northern Bass Strait between the Furneaux Group and Wilsons Promontory in Victoria.

== Fauna ==
Recorded breeding seabird and wader species include little penguin, short-tailed shearwater, fairy prion, common diving-petrel, Pacific gull and sooty oystercatcher.
