= Daphne (brig) =

Ship wrecked in Bass Strait in 1819

History

United Kingdom
- Name: Daphne
- Owner: William Campbell, Sydney
- Builder: Built in Java
- Fate: Wrecked, 26 October 1819 in the Kent Group, Bass Strait

General characteristics
- Class & type: Brig
- Tons burthen: 151 (bm)

Daphne was a brig constructed in Java that arrived in Australia in 1814. She was wrecked without loss of life on 26 October 1819 in the Kent Group in Bass Strait. She was on a voyage from Port Jackson to India.

In August 1819, Daphne, Captain Howard, sailed from Hobart for Port Jackson with wheat and potatoes.

Daphne departed Sydney bound for India on 10 October 1819 under the command of John Howard. As she passed through Bass Strait he stopped at several islands to purchase sealskins from sealers in the area. On 26 October a gale rose and Howard sheltered in the lee of East Island. Howard went ashore, probably to find sealers. On arriving on shore he noticed that Daphne was being driven towards the rocks. He returned on board but could do little to save the brig. He therefore ordered the passengers and crew to abandon ship. The passengers made it to shore safely but Daphne was totally destroyed.

The longboat was badly damaged and it took Howard and his crew some eight days to repair it. He then took his chief mate and three seamen and headed to Launceston on 4 August. Although he was blown off course, he eventually made Hobart on 14 November 1819. There he chartered the sloop Governor Sorrell to rescue the eight passengers and crew remaining on East Island. Meanwhile, John Palmer arrived and took on board some of the wreck survivors and attempted to head back to Hobart. However she was wrecked too. One passenger lost her life. The survivors had to await the arrival of Governor Sorrel for their rescue.

Lloyd's List reported on 4 July 1820 based on a report from Port Jackson dated 12 December 1819, that the brig Daphne, Howard, master, had wrecked about 200 miles north of the Derwent. She was a total loss but her crew had been saved. Another report stated that during a voyage from Port Jackson to India she was driven onto rocks off East Island, Van Diemen's Land, in the Kent Group and wrecked on 26 October 1819 and that all 13 people on board survived.
