= Judgement Rocks =

Island in Tasmania, Australia

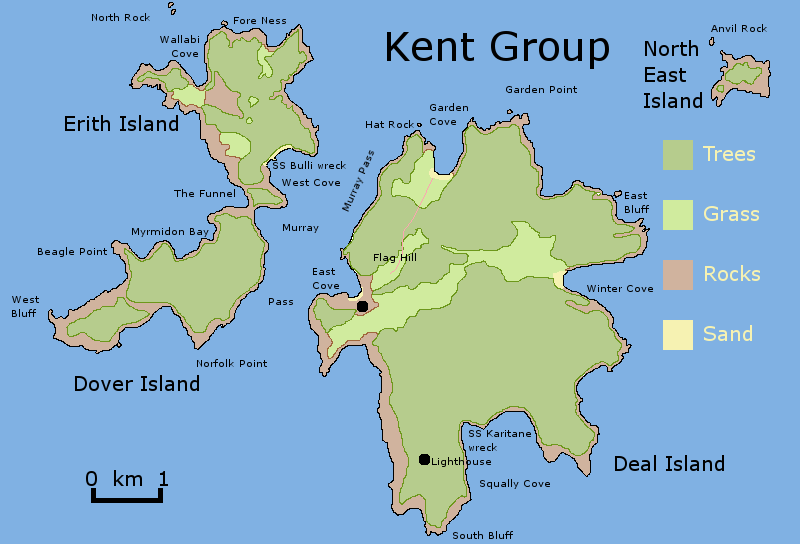
- The Judgement Rocks, as located within the Kent Group.

- Location within Tasmania
- Etymology: Flinders: "from its resemblance to an elevated seat".

Geography
- Location: Bass Strait
- Coordinates: 39°30′S 147°07′E
- Archipelago: Kent Group
- Area: 0.39 ha (0.96 acres)

Administration
- Australia
- State: Tasmania

Demographics
- Population: unpopulated

The Judgement Rocks, part of the Kent Group, is a small unpopulated 0.39-hectare (0.96-acre) granite islet and some associated bare rocks, located in the Bass Strait, lying off the north-east coast of Tasmania, between the Furneaux Group and Wilsons Promontory in Victoria, Australia. The islet and associated rocks are contained within the Kent Group National Park.

The rock was named by Matthew Flinders "from its resemblance to an elevated seat".

Joanna Murray-Smith's novel Judgement Rock is named for the rocks and set among the islands of the Kent Group.

== Fauna ==
Recorded breeding seabird and wader species include fairy prion, Pacific gull, silver gull, and sooty oystercatcher. The island hosts Tasmania's largest breeding colony of Australian fur seals, which also attracts visits by killer whales. The only reptile present is the metallic skink.

== See also ==
- List of islands of Tasmania
- Protected areas of Tasmania
