= Deal Island (Tasmania) =

Island in Tasmania, Australia

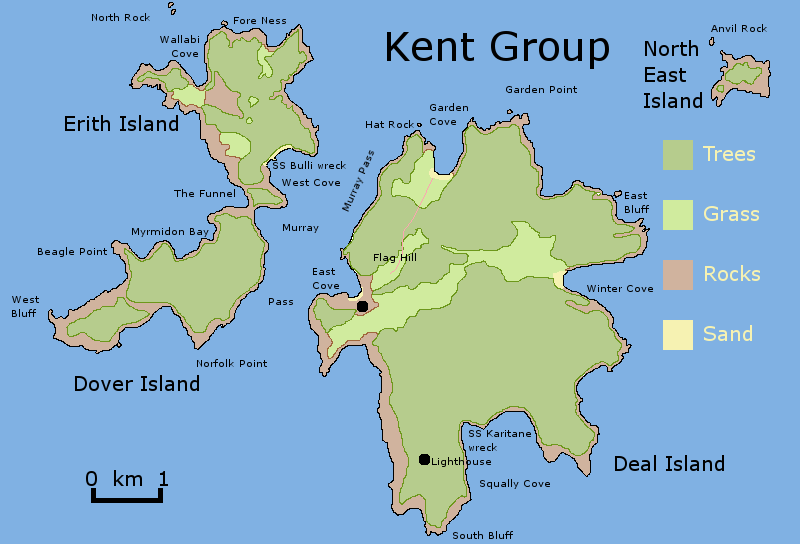
- Deal Island is the largest of the Kent Group.

- Location within Tasmania

Geography
- Location: Bass Strait
- Coordinates: 39°28′12″S 147°19′12″E
- Archipelago: Kent Group
- Area: 1,576 ha (3,890 acres)

Administration
- Australia
- State: Tasmania

Deal Island, the largest island of the Kent Group, is a 1,576-hectare (3,890-acre) granite island, located in northern Bass Strait, that lies between the Furneaux Group, north-east of Tasmania, and Wilsons Promontory, in Victoria, Australia.

== Location and features ==
The island is contained entirely within the 2,374-hectare (5,870-acre) Kent Group National Park, Tasmania’s northernmost national park, gazetted in 2002. In 2004, the national park was extended to include the marine waters of the three major islands of the Kent Group, encapsulating 29,000 hectares (72,000 acres) of marine reserve.

Deal Island is at the southern end of the 292,800-hectare (724,000-acre) Beagle Commonwealth Marine Reserve, that encloses the Kent Group Marine Reserve and the Hogan and Curtis Island groups.

Deal Island has been extensively modified by human activity, with the construction of facilities, and the clearing of vegetation and regular firing associated with grazing livestock. There is a lighthouse, a closed airstrip, roads, jetty, two houses, a dam and a museum.

=== Lighthouse ===
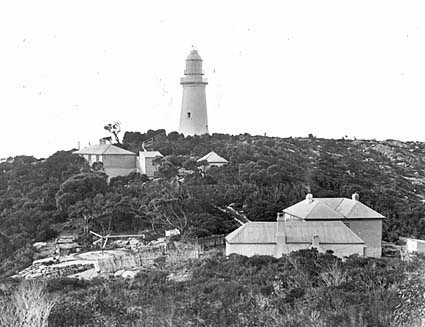
Deal Island Lighthouse

Deal Island has the highest lighthouse in the Southern Hemisphere, standing 305 metres (1,001 ft) above sea level. The light was sometimes visible at night from Wilson's Promontory, 80 kilometres (50 mi) away. The lighthouse was built in 1848 and deactivated in 1992. While active, the height of the tower caused problems with visibility in low cloud conditions. Management and conservation of the structure is under the control of the Tasmania Parks and Wildlife Service.

=== Aircraft crash ===
On 26 April 1943, during World War II, an RAAF Airspeed Oxford aircraft crashed on the island, killing all four crewmen. The aircraft wreck, and the crew's graves, are about 15 metres (49 ft) apart at the bottom of a cliff. The bodies have since been disinterred and buried at Springvale, Victoria. Eyewitness accounts say the plane flew low over a ship which was actually a wreck, and then failed to regain enough height before hitting the cliff.

== Fauna ==
Seabird and wader species that have been recorded breeding on the island include the little penguin, the Pacific gull and the sooty oystercatcher. Mammals found on the island include the red-necked wallaby, the common brushtail possum, the southern brown bandicoot, the fur seal, and the introduced European rabbit. Reptiles include the metallic skink, Bougainville's skink, White's skink and the white-lipped snake.

== Climate ==
Deal Island has a borderline Mediterranean (Csb)/oceanic climate (Cfb) with mild, short, somewhat dry summers and cool, wet winters, owing to its exposed location.

Climate data for Deal Island (1871-present)
Month	Jan	Feb	Mar	Apr	May	Jun	Jul	Aug	Sep	Oct	Nov	Dec	Year
Record high °C (°F)	35.8 (96.4)	32.8 (91.0)	31.3 (88.3)	25.5 (77.9)	23.2 (73.8)	18.2 (64.8)	17.2 (63.0)	20.4 (68.7)	24.9 (76.8)	26.0 (78.8)	33.6 (92.5)	30.2 (86.4)	35.8 (96.4)
Mean daily maximum °C (°F)	20.2 (68.4)	20.5 (68.9)	19.4 (66.9)	17.6 (63.7)	15.6 (60.1)	13.5 (56.3)	12.7 (54.9)	12.8 (55.0)	13.7 (56.7)	15.4 (59.7)	16.8 (62.2)	18.3 (64.9)	16.4 (61.5)
Mean daily minimum °C (°F)	14.1 (57.4)	14.6 (58.3)	14.2 (57.6)	12.8 (55.0)	11.5 (52.7)	9.7 (49.5)	8.5 (47.3)	8.2 (46.8)	8.9 (48.0)	9.8 (49.6)	11.2 (52.2)	12.6 (54.7)	11.3 (52.3)
Record low °C (°F)	4.9 (40.8)	8.0 (46.4)	3.8 (38.8)	3.3 (37.9)	0.4 (32.7)	−0.5 (31.1)	−0.5 (31.1)	−5.5 (22.1)	−0.2 (31.6)	5.0 (41.0)	−4.0 (24.8)	2.5 (36.5)	−5.5 (22.1)
Average precipitation mm (inches)	40.7 (1.60)	38.7 (1.52)	52.3 (2.06)	61.1 (2.41)	73.6 (2.90)	78.5 (3.09)	78.5 (3.09)	73.3 (2.89)	61.4 (2.42)	60.8 (2.39)	50.8 (2.00)	49.6 (1.95)	718.8 (28.30)
Average precipitation days (≥ 0.2 mm)	8.2	7.4	9.7	12.4	14.8	16.0	16.9	16.4	14.5	13.3	11.5	10.0	151.1
Source: Bureau of Meteorology

== See also ==
- List of islands of Tasmania
