= Boundary Islet =

Island in Bass Strait, Australia

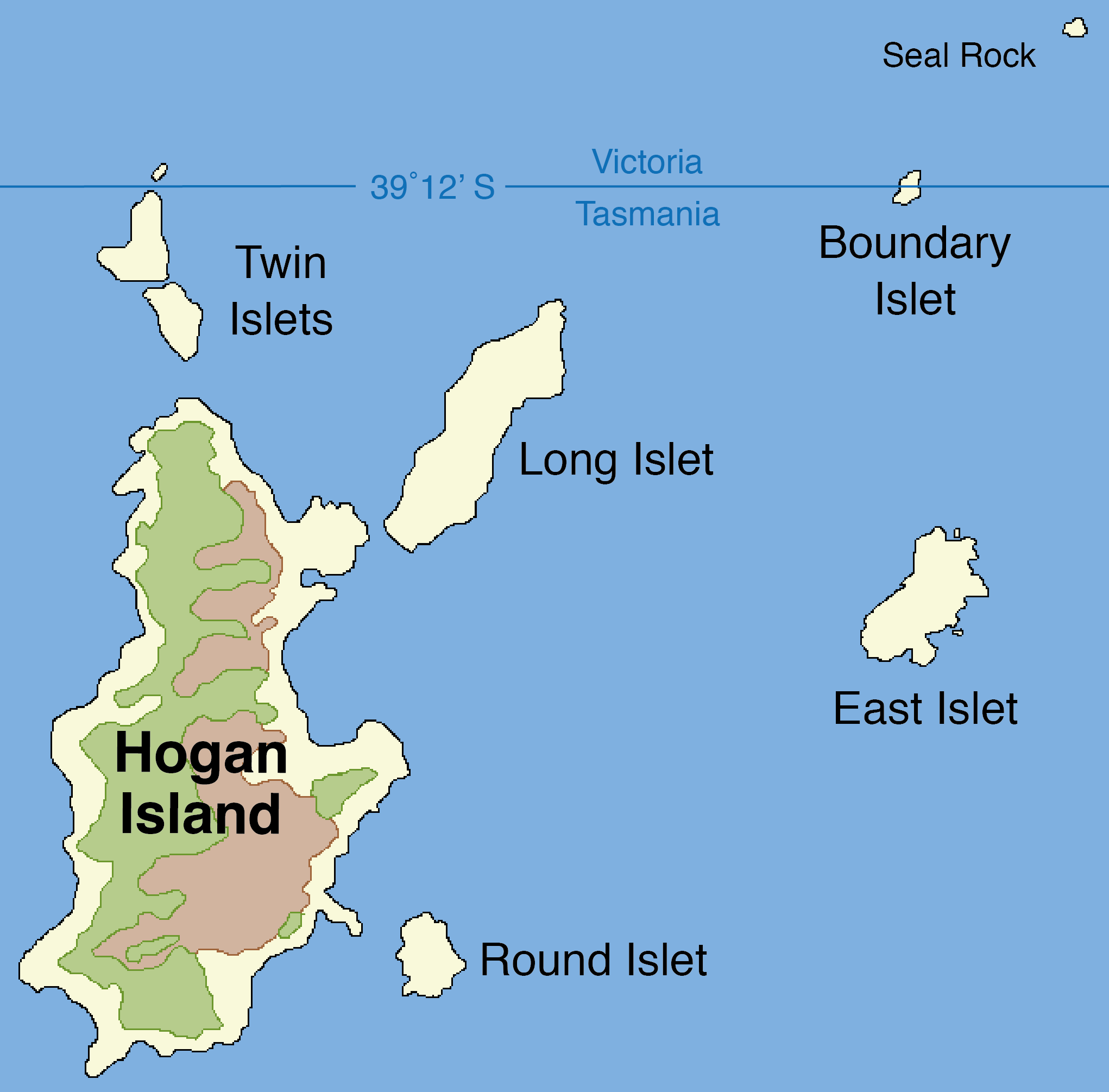
- Map of Hogan Group showing Boundary Islet

- Location within Tasmania

Geography
- Location: Bass Strait
- Coordinates: 39°11′54″S 147°01′18″E
- Archipelago: Hogan Group
- Area: 2 ha (4.9 acres)
- Length: 141 m (463 ft)

Administration
- Australia
- States: Victoria (north); Tasmania (south)

Boundary Islet, historically known as North East Islet, is a 2-hectare (4.9-acre) islet in the Hogan Island Group of Bass Strait, at a latitude of 39°12′ S, about 56 kilometres (35 mi) east of the southernmost point of mainland Victoria. The islet straddles the maritime border of the Australian states of Victoria and Tasmania, hence the name.

The Tasmanian portion of the islet forms that state's North East Islet Nature Reserve, gazetted on 5 April 1978. The reserve's name was conferred prior to the islet's change of name, to Boundary Islet, under Tasmanian legislation. This change was gazetted on 28 March 1990.

== Tasmania–Victoria land border ==
Boundary Islet is divided in the east–west direction at the latitude 39°12′ S, with the northern portion belonging to Victoria and the southern portion belonging to Tasmania. This is Tasmania's only land border, and at 85 metres (279 ft) long, it is the shortest land border between any two Australian states or territories.

This situation is accidental, and arose as a result of an error made by Captain John Black, who surveyed the position of the islet in 1801 and determined its latitude to be slightly farther north than it truly is. The boundary between Victoria and Tasmania was later set along the latitude of 39°12′ S, which was then thought to be completely south of Boundary Islet and not to traverse any land in Bass Strait. This would have made the islet completely within the jurisdiction of Victoria. However, when Boundary Islet's correct latitude was later determined it was found to straddle the border. It is for this reason that what was once known as North East Islet (being situated in the north-east of the Hogan Group) came to be known as Boundary Islet.

== See also ==
- List of islands of Australia
- List of islands of Tasmania
