= Erith Island =

Island in Tasmania, Australia

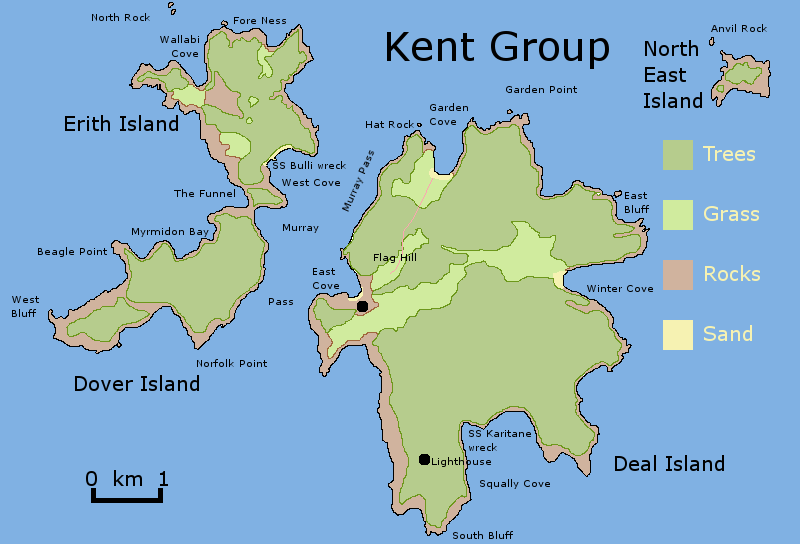
- The Erith Island, as located within the Kent Group.

- Location within Tasmania

Geography
- Location: Bass Strait
- Coordinates: 39°26′24″S 147°17′24″E
- Archipelago: Kent Group
- Area: 393 ha (970 acres)

Administration
- Australia
- State: Tasmania

Demographics
- Population: unpopulated

Erith Island, the second largest island in the Kent Group, is a densely vegetated and unpopulated 323-hectare (800-acre) granite island with steep slopes, located in the Bass Strait, lying off the north-east coast of Tasmania, between the Furneaux Group and Wilsons Promontory in Victoria, Australia.

The island is contained within the Kent Group National Park, Tasmania's northernmost national park, which was gazetted in 2002. Erith was highly modified for cattle grazing and is mainly covered by exotic pasture. Grazing ended with the acquisition of the lease in 1997 by the Australian Bush Heritage Fund, which subsequently relinquished it to the Tasmanian Government for incorporation in the national park.

== Fauna ==
Recorded breeding seabird and wader species include little penguin, short-tailed shearwater, Pacific gull, and sooty oystercatcher. Mammals on Erith are the southern brown bandicoot, long-nosed potoroo and common brushtail possum. Reptiles include the metallic skink, eastern three-lined skink, White's skink and white-lipped snake.

== See also ==
- List of islands of Tasmania
- Protected areas of Tasmania
