= Kent Group =

Group of islands in Tasmania, Australia

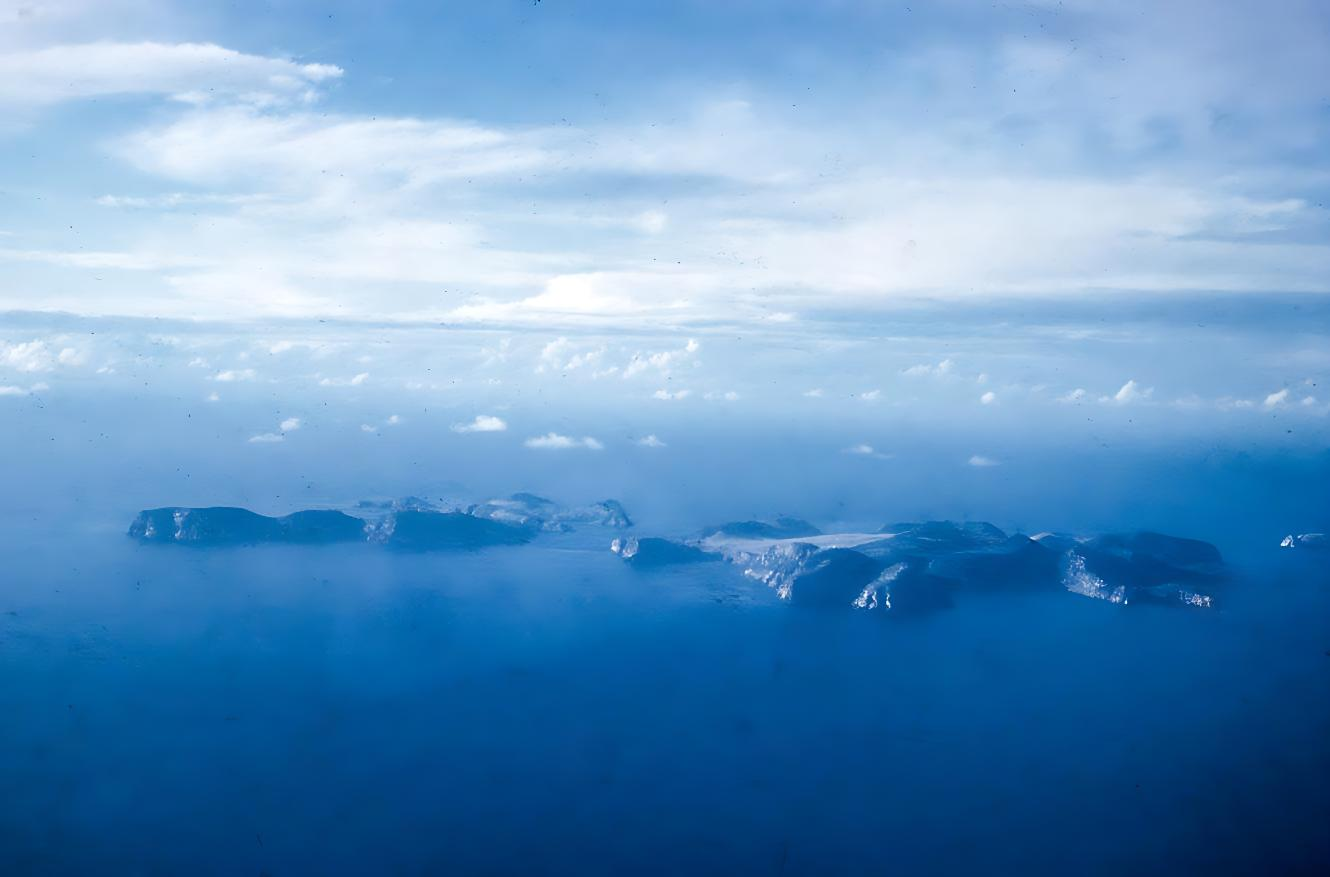
- Kent Group

- Location within Tasmania
- Etymology: William Kent

Geography
- Location: Bass Strait
- Coordinates: 39°27′36″S 147°19′48″E
- Total islands: 6
- Major islands: Deal Island
- Area: 1,576 ha (3,890 acres)

Administration
- Australia
- State: Tasmania

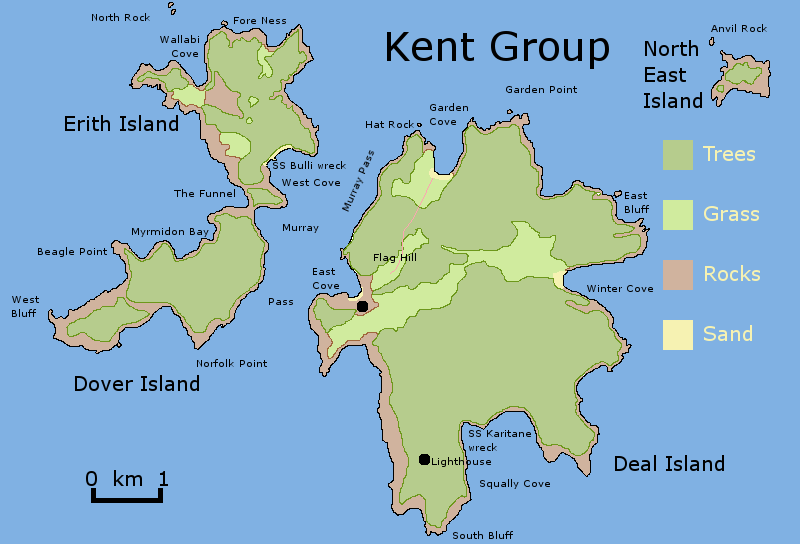
Kent Group map

The Kent Group are a grouping of six granite islands located in Bass Strait, north-west of the Furneaux Group in Tasmania, Australia. Collectively, the group is comprised within the Kent Group National Park.

The islands were named Kent's Group by Matthew Flinders, "in honour of my friend captain William Kent, then commander of Supply" when Flinders passed them on 8 February 1798 in Francis (on her way to salvage Sydney Cove). The largest island in the group is Deal Island; the others, in order of descending size, are Erith Island, Dover Island, North East Isle, South West Isle and Judgement Rocks.

== History ==
Seal hunting took place on the islands from at least 1803.

== Shipwrecks ==
Murray Pass, named for the explorer John Murray, between Deal and Erith Islands has long been used by ships to shelter from gales in Bass Strait, but it is a dangerous, partly open, roadstead, and many ships have been wrecked after sudden changes in wind direction and speed. Others have hit the island either while attempting to shelter or through poor navigation in darkness or bad weather, several with heavy loss of life. They include:

- 1816, Brothers, schooner, 40 tons, Captain William Hovell, one life lost.
- 1819, Daphne, brig, 151 tons, Captain John Howard, no lives lost.
- 1819, John Palmer, schooner, 37 tons, Captain Bastian, two lives lost (one ex Daphne)
- 1831, Ionia, snow, 226 tons, Captain Buck. ?Three lives lost.
- 1850, Ida, schooner, 50 tons, no loss of life.
- 1851, White Squall, schooner, 104 tons, Captain Chattock, no loss of life.
- 1852, Dorset, brig, 82 tons, Captain Birdwood, no loss of life.
- 1852, Mary, brig, 308 tons, no loss of life.
- 1855, Elizabeth Mason, schooner, 79 tons, Captain McIntyre, no loss of life.
- 1856, Kendall, schooner, 157 tons, Captain Read, no lives lost.
- 1862, Reindeer, schooner, 104 tons, Captain Morris, all hands (about 8) lost.
- 1863, General Jessup, barque, 193 tons, Captain Hodge, no loss of life.
- 1866, Boscarne, schooner, 63 tons, Captain Black, no loss of life.
- 1875, Essie Black, barque, 281 tons, Captain Sivier, all hands (about 10) lost.
- 1877, Bulli, iron steamship, 524 tons, Captain Randell, no loss of life (a popular dive wreck).
- 1921, Karitane, steel steamship, 1376 tons, Captain Spain, no loss of life.
- 1930, Ida N, new fishing boat, 25 tons, Captain Busk, no lives lost.
- 1961, St Nicholas, newly completed fish carrier, 45 tons, no loss of life.

== See also ==
- List of islands of Tasmania
- Protected areas of Tasmania
