= Hogan Group =

Islands in Tasmania, Australia

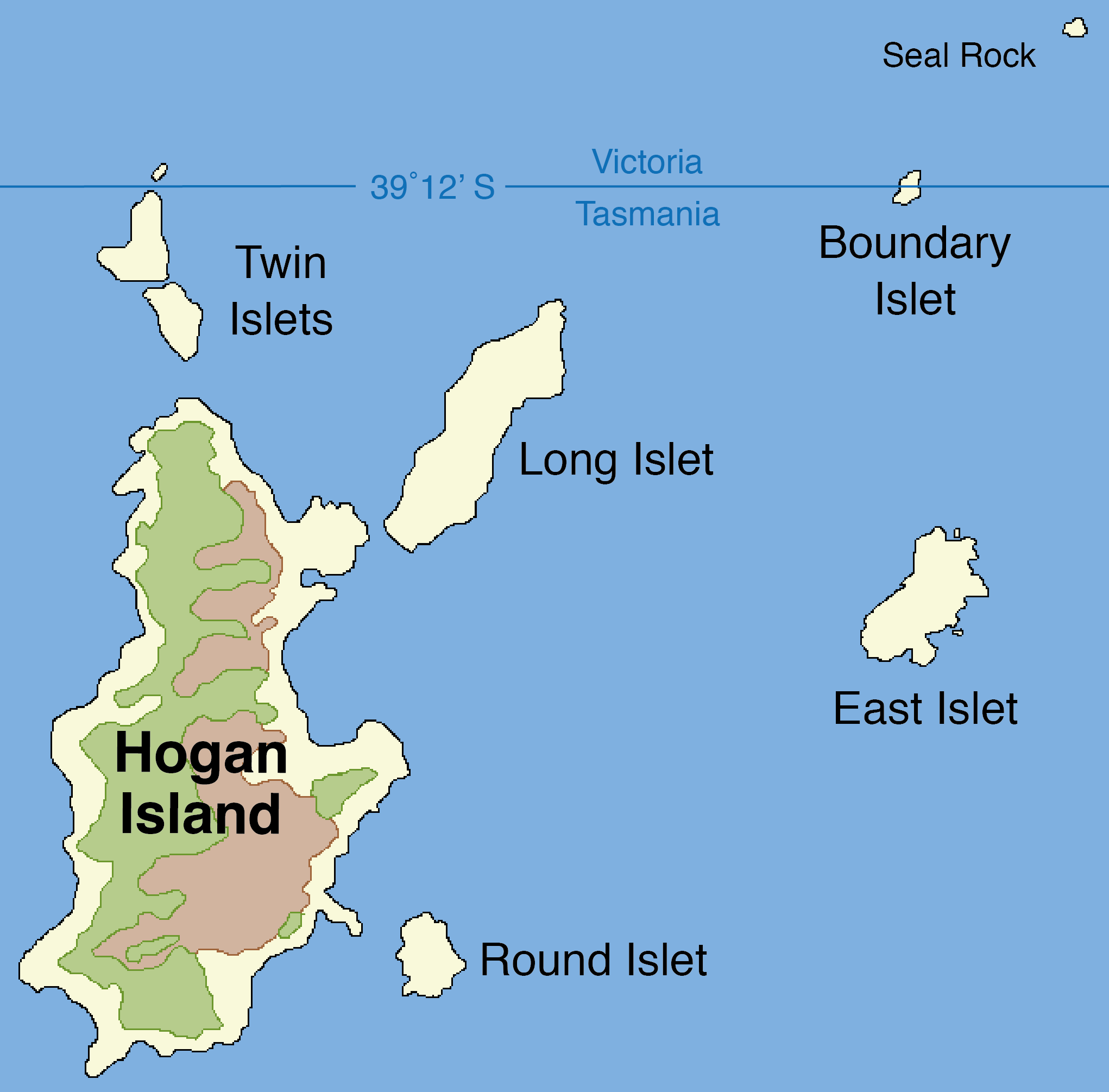
- Map of the Hogan Group

- Location within Tasmania
- Etymology: Michael Hogan

Geography
- Location: Bass Strait
- Coordinates: 39°15′S 146°59′E
- Archipelago: Hogan Group
- Total islands: 6-8
- Major islands: Hogan Island
- Highest elevation: 130 m (430 ft)

Administration
- Australia
- State: Victoria
- State: Tasmania

The Hogan Group is a collection of six (to eight) islands and islets located in the Bass Strait that define part of the border between mainland Australia and the island state of Tasmania. Within the jurisdiction of Tasmania, the Hogan Group forms a land border between the states of Tasmania and Victoria. The island group is officially designated unallocated Crown land, within the Flinders Municipality in Tasmania and the South Gippsland Shire in Victoria.

The Hogan Group comprises the Hogan Island, Twin, Long, Round, East, Boundary (or North East) islets, and Seal Rock.

== Location and geography ==
The Hogan Group is located 40 kilometres (25 mi) southeast of Wilsons Promontory in the Bass Strait. The islands are made up of grey and red granite and limestone. A group of fur seals live on Boundary Islet. Other plants and animals that live on and near the island group include Cystophora intermedia, eelgrass, kelp, and abalone.

== History ==
During the Pleistocene period, the Hogan Group was part of a land bridge that connected Tasmania to mainland Australia. After the glacial period ended, the Hogan Group were the first group of islands to become isolated by rising sea levels.

The Hogan Group was discovered by Europeans and named in 1801 by John Black, captain of the brig Harbinger, who named the island group after Michael Hogan, the owner of his ship. There are records of settlers on the island group, who hunted seals and kangaroos and used the islands for grazing land. On 12 October 1900, the first lease was recorded and given for Hogan Island. While the original lease covered the entire island group, since 1959 the lease has only applied to Hogan Island, which has been leased by B.R. Stackhouse since 1967, who uses the island for sheep and cattle grazing.

Black erred in his initial survey, placing the group further north than they actually are, which led to the Victoria-Tasmania land border on Boundary Islet.

== See also ==
- List of islands of Tasmania
