= Michael Hogan (shipowner) =

Irish-born shipowner

Michael Hogan (1766–1833) was an Irish-born shipowner involved in the early settlement of Australia.

Michael Hogan was born in Ireland in 1766. Between 1780 and 1784 he served as a seaman and midshipman in the Royal Navy. After leaving the navy he sailed as a seaman on trading voyages to India and China before becoming owner and captain of a ship trading between India and Europe. In 1789 Hogan married Frances Richardson, the illegitimate daughter of William Richardson, a trader that Hogan engaged in business with out of Bombay, and his at least partially ethnically Indian housekeeper, Anna Marie Lacy.

Under the command of Hogan, Marquis Cornwallis departed Cork, Ireland on 9 August 1795, carrying 163 male and 70 female convicts. She also carried 36 soldiers of the New South Wales Corps, and their families. About a month into the voyage Hogan had to put down a mutiny, with the result that seven convicts and a sergeant, one of the mutineers, died of their injuries, including flogging. Marquis Cornwallis then stayed for almost a month at the Cape, re-provisioning. She arrived at Port Jackson on 11 February 1796. In all, 11 male convicts died during the course of the voyage.

Hogan settled his family in New York in 1802, but continued to trade in various ships with Valparaíso, Chile and other south Pacific ports.

From 1815 to 1817 Hogan was US consul at Cork in Ireland. From 1819 to 1820 he was US consul at Havana, Cuba. In 1823 he was appointed U.S. Consul and Navy Agent at Valparaíso. He held this position until his death.

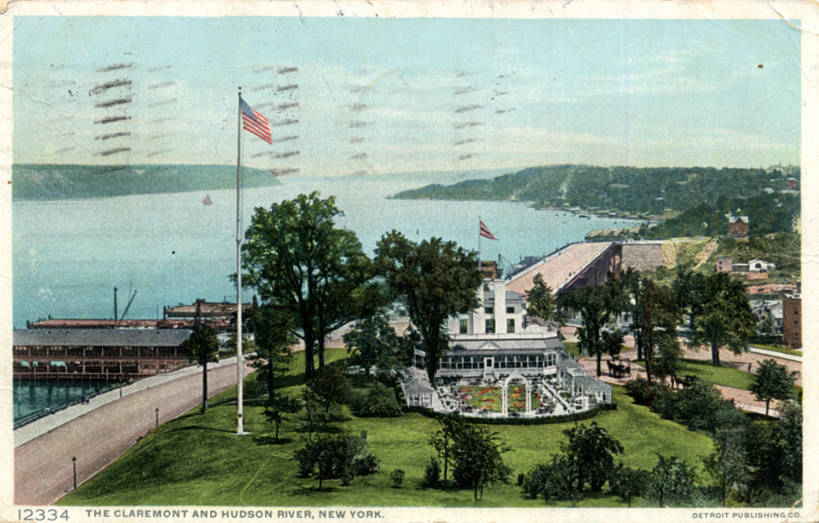
Claremont Inn, early 20th century

Hogan was involved in business enterprises in upstate New York, particularly in what became Bombay, New York. However he generally lived in New York City. He seems to have resided in Watertown, New York for some period of time. In New York City Hogan had a 100-acre estate positioned along the Hudson River with 107th Street as its southern edge. He named his house Claremont, and it later became the Claremont Inn.

He died in 1833 at Washington, District of Columbia.

His son William Hogan was a United States representative from New York from 1831 to 1833.

The Hogan Group of islands in Bass Strait in between the Australian mainland and Tasmania is named after him.

== Sources ==
- listing at Political Graveyard
