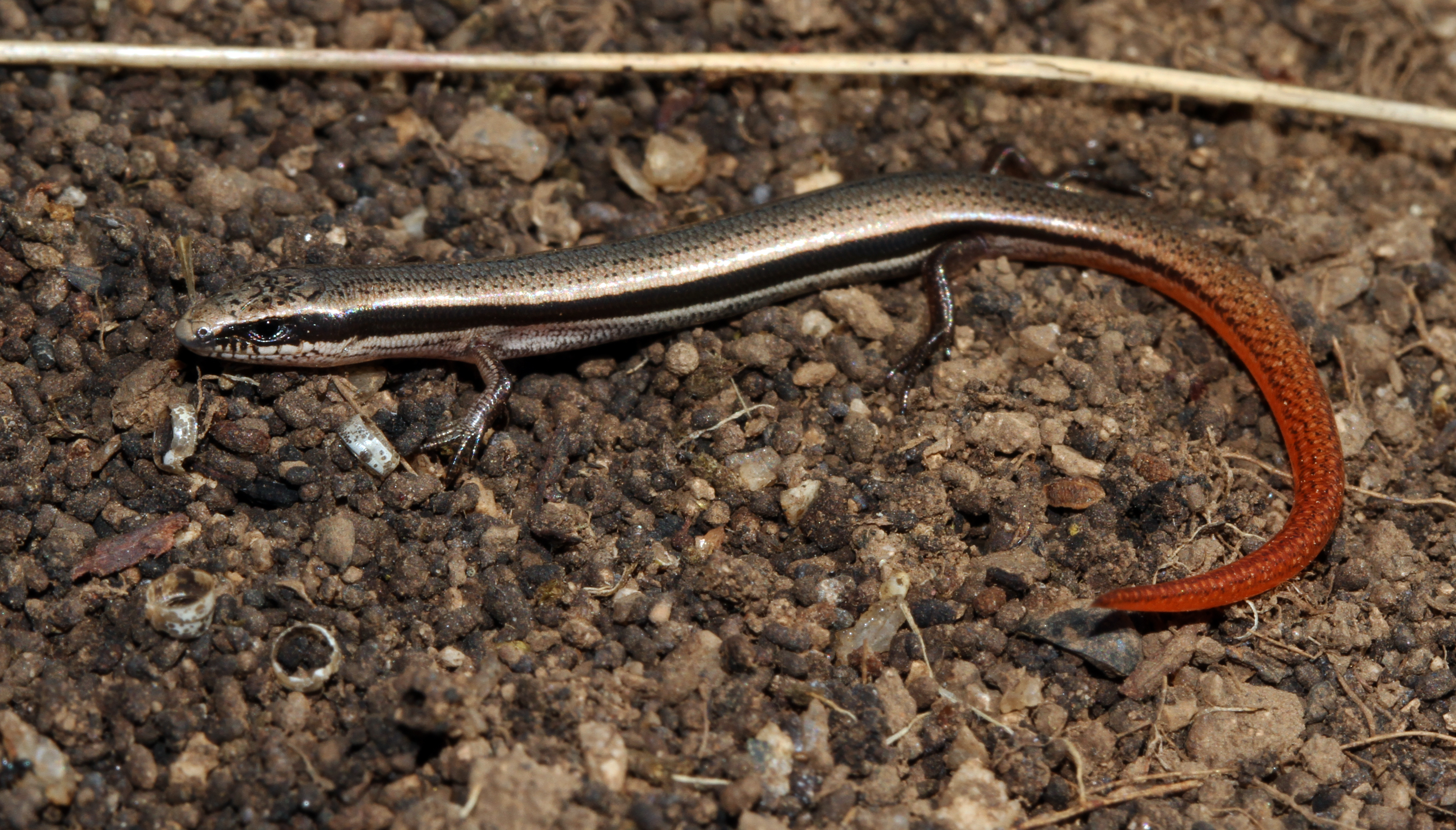

Conservation status
- Least Concern (IUCN 3.1)

Scientific classification
- Kingdom: Animalia
- Phylum: Chordata
- Class: Reptilia
- Order: Squamata
- Family: Scincidae
- Genus: Lerista
- Species: L. bougainvillii

Binomial name
- Lerista bougainvillii (Gray, 1839)

Synonyms
- Riopa Brougainvillii [sic] Gray, 1839; Lygosoma bougainvillii — A.M.C. Duméril & Bibron, 1839; Rhodona bougainvillii — M.A. Smith, 1937; Nodorha bougainvillii — Mittleman, 1952; Lerista bougainvillii — Greer, 1967

= Bougainville's skink =

Species of lizard

Bougainville's skink (Lerista bougainvillii) is a species of skink, a lizard in the family Scincidae. This species is also commonly called the south-eastern slider and Bougainville's lerista.

== Etymology ==
The specific name, bougainvillii, and the common names, Bougainville's skink and Bougainville's lerista, are in honour of French naval officer Hyacinthe de Bougainville.

== Geographic range ==
L. bougainvillii is found in south-eastern Australia, including north-eastern Tasmania and many Bass Strait islands.

== Description ==
Bougainville's skink has very reduced limbs and moves in a snake-like manner.

== Habitat ==
The preferred natural habitats of L. bougainvillii are forest and shrubland. However, it is seldom seen, as much of its life is spent beneath leaf-litter, loose sand, and thin stone slabs.

== Reproduction ==
The mode of reproduction of L. bougainvillii varies. Some populations are oviparous, but other populations are viviparous.
