= Kent Group National Park =

National park in Tasmania, Australia

- IUCN category II (national park)
- Location within Tasmania
- Location: Tasmania
- Coordinates: 39.47°S 147.32°E
- Area: 312.83 km^{2} (120.78 sq mi)(includes marine area)
- Established: April 28, 1971
- Governing body: Tasmania Parks and Wildlife Service
- Website: Official website

Kent Group National Park is located in Bass Strait covering the Kent Group islands of Tasmania, Australia. The islands cover an area of 23.74 km^{2} (9.17 sq mi) while the marine reserve component of the national park which surrounds the islands cover 290 km^{2} (110 sq mi).

== History and prior use of the land ==
The islands have a rich Aboriginal cultural heritage with human occupation of the area estimated to date to between 8,000 and 13,000 years ago. The establishment of sealer settlements by Europeans in Eastern Bass Strait, including Kent Group, were amongst the earliest outside Sydney Cove. A lighthouse was constructed on Deal Island in 1848, with permanent human habitation until its deactivation in 1992. Parts of the islands were subject to grazing cattle until as recent as 1996.

== Marine Reserve ==
Kent Group has a high diversity of fish species, likely due to the convergence of influences including the East Australian Current and westerly flow of Bass Strait. The marine reserve area generally east of Deal Island prohibits fishing.

== See also ==
- Protected areas of Tasmania
