= Hobbs Island (Tasmania) =

Island in Tasmania, Australia

Nickname: Green Island
- Location within Tasmania

Geography
- Location: South western Tasmania
- Coordinates: 43°13′12″S 145°46′48″E
- Archipelago: Trumpeter Islets Group
- Adjacent to: Southern Ocean
- Area: 9.7 ha (24 acres)

Administration
- Australia
- State: Tasmania
- Region: South West

Demographics
- Population: Unpopulated

Hobbs Island, also known as Green Island, is an unpopulated island located close to the south-western coast of Tasmania, Australia. Situated some 1 kilometre (0.62 mi) north of where the mouth of Port Davey meets the Southern Ocean, the 9.7-hectare (24-acre) island is part of the Trumpeter Islets Group, and comprises part of the Southwest National Park and the Tasmanian Wilderness World Heritage Site.

== Fauna ==
The island is part of the Port Davey Islands Important Bird Area, so identified by BirdLife International because of its importance for breeding seabirds. Recorded breeding seabird and wader species are the little penguin (11,000 pairs), short-tailed shearwater (11,000 pairs), Pacific gull, sooty oystercatcher and pied oystercatcher. The rakali has been recorded from the island. The Tasmanian tree skink is present.

== See also ==
- List of islands of Tasmania
