= Kathleen Island =

Island in Tasmania, Australia

- Location within Tasmania

Geography
- Location: Port Davey
- Coordinates: 43°18′00″S 145°57′36″E
- Archipelago: Breaksea Islands Group
- Adjacent to: Southern Ocean
- Area: 11.35 ha (28.0 acres)
- Highest elevation: 72 m (236 ft)

Administration
- Australia
- State: Tasmania
- Region: South West

Demographics
- Population: 0

Kathleen Island is a steeply cliffed island that lies within Port Davey, an oceanic inlet, located in the south west region of Tasmania, Australia. The island has an area of approximately 11.35 hectares (28.0 acres) and is contained with the Southwest National Park, part of the Tasmanian Wilderness World Heritage Site and the Port Davey/Bathurst Harbour Marine Nature Reserve.

== Features and location ==
Part of the Breaksea Islands Group, Kathleen Island has an elevation of approximately 72 metres (236 ft) above sea level. The island is almost split by a deep gulch.

Kathleen island is part of the Port Davey Islands Important Bird Area, so identified by BirdLife International because of its importance for breeding seabirds. Most of the island is covered by thick scrub and rainforest. Recorded breeding seabird species are the little penguin (1-200 pairs) and short-tailed shearwater (67,000 pairs). Burrowing seabirds have caused erosion in places. The metallic skink is present.

== See also ==
- List of islands of Tasmania
