= Wild Wind Islets =

Islets in Tasmania, Australia

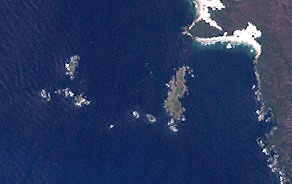
- A Landsat image of the Mutton Bird Islands Group.

- Location within Tasmania

Geography
- Location: South western Tasmania
- Coordinates: 43°27′S 146°00′E
- Archipelago: Mutton Bird Islands Group
- Adjacent to: Southern Ocean
- Area: 3.95 ha (9.8 acres)

Administration
- Australia
- State: Tasmania
- Region: South West

Demographics
- Population: Unpopulated

The Wild Wind Islets comprise a group of five steep rocky unpopulated islets located close to the south-western coast of Tasmania, Australia. Situated some 2 kilometres (1.2 mi) south of where the mouth of Port Davey meets the Southern Ocean, the 3.95-hectare (9.8-acre) islets are one of the eight islands that comprise the Mutton Bird Islands Group. The Wild Wind Islets are part of the Southwest National Park and the Tasmanian Wilderness World Heritage Site.

== Fauna ==
The island is part of the Port Davey Islands Important Bird Area, so identified by BirdLife International because of its importance for breeding seabirds. Recorded breeding seabird species are the short-tailed shearwater, (20,000 pairs), fairy prion (3000 pairs), common diving-petrel (3000 pairs) and silver gull. The white-bellied sea-eagle has nested there. The metallic skink is present.

== See also ==
- List of islands of Tasmania
