= Sugarmouse Island =

Island in Tasmania, Australia

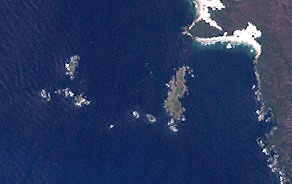
- A Landsat image of the Mutton Bird Islands Group.

- Location within Tasmania

Geography
- Location: South western Tasmania
- Coordinates: 43°25′12″S 145°57′54″E
- Archipelago: Mutton Bird Islands Group
- Adjacent to: Southern Ocean
- Area: 0.54 ha (1.3 acres)

Administration
- Australia
- State: Tasmania
- Region: South West

Demographics
- Population: Unpopulated

Sugarmouse Island is an unpopulated islet located close to the south-western coast of Tasmania, Australia. Situated some 2 kilometres (1.2 mi) south of where the mouth of Port Davey meets the Southern Ocean, the 0.54-hectare (1.3-acre) islet is one of the eight islands that comprise the Mutton Bird Islands Group. Sugarmouse Island is part of the Southwest National Park and the Tasmanian Wilderness World Heritage Site.

== Fauna ==
The island is part of the Port Davey Islands Important Bird Area, so identified by BirdLife International because of its importance for breeding seabirds. Recorded breeding seabird species are the fairy prion (2000 pairs) and black-faced cormorant.

== See also ==
- List of islands of Tasmania
