= Wendar Island =

Island in Tasmania, Australia

- Location within Tasmania

Geography
- Location: South western Tasmania
- Coordinates: 43°24′36″S 145°55′12″E
- Archipelago: Mutton Bird Islands Group
- Adjacent to: Southern Ocean
- Total islands: 6
- Area: 5.8 ha (14 acres)

Administration
- Australia
- State: Tasmania
- Region: South West

Demographics
- Population: Unpopulated

Wendar Island comprises a main unpopulated island and five immediately adjacent islets located close to the south-western coast of Tasmania, Australia. Situated some 2 kilometres (1.2 mi) south of where the mouth of Port Davey meets the Southern Ocean, the 5.8-hectare (14-acre) island and islets are one of the eight islands that comprise the Mutton Bird Islands Group. The Mutton Bird Island is part of the Southwest National Park and the Tasmanian Wilderness World Heritage Site.

== Fauna ==
The island is part of the Port Davey Islands Important Bird Area, so identified by BirdLife International because of its importance for breeding seabirds. Recorded breeding seabird species are the little penguin (500 pairs), short-tailed shearwater (3-4000 pairs), fairy prion (1500 pairs) and silver gull.

== See also ==
- List of islands of Tasmania
