= The Coffee Pot (Tasmania) =

Islet on south west coast of Tasmania, Australia

Badger
Nickname: Coffee Pot
- Location within Tasmania

Geography
- Location: South western Tasmania
- Coordinates: 43°18′19″S 145°48′28″E
- Archipelago: Trumpeter Islets Group
- Adjacent to: Southern Ocean
- Area: 0.31 ha (0.77 acres)

Administration
- Australia
- State: Tasmania
- Region: South West

Demographics
- Population: Unpopulated

The Coffee Pot, also known simply as Coffee Pot, with a shape suggesting a coffee pot, is an unpopulated steep, rocky islet located close to the south-western coast of Tasmania, Australia. It is situated some 2 kilometres (1.2 mi) northwest of where the mouth of Port Davey meets the Southern Ocean, the 0.31-hectare (0.77-acre) islet is part of the Trumpeter Islets Group, and comprises part of the Southwest National Park and the Tasmanian Wilderness World Heritage Site.

== Fauna ==
The islet is part of the Port Davey Islands Important Bird Area, so identified by BirdLife International because of its importance for breeding seabirds. The black-faced cormorant breeds on the islet.

== See also ==
- List of islands of Tasmania
