= East Pyramids =

Islands in Tasmania, Australia

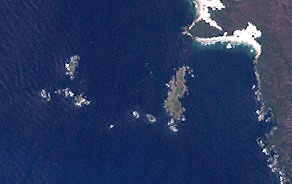
- A Landsat image of the Mutton Bird Islands Group; the East Pyramids are located on the far left.

- Location within Tasmania

Geography
- Location: South western Tasmania
- Coordinates: 43°24′36″S 145°54′36″E
- Archipelago: Mutton Bird Islands Group
- Adjacent to: Southern Ocean
- Total islands: 3
- Area: 6.69 ha (16.5 acres)

Administration
- Australia
- State: Tasmania
- Region: South West

Demographics
- Population: Unpopulated

The East Pyramids comprise a group of three steep, rocky unpopulated islets located close to the south-western coast of Tasmania, Australia. Situated some 2 kilometres (1.2 mi) south of where the mouth of Port Davey meets the Southern Ocean, the 6.69-hectare (16.5-acre) islets are one of the eight islands that comprise the Mutton Bird Islands Group. The East Pyramids are part of the Southwest National Park and the Tasmanian Wilderness World Heritage Site.

== Flora and fauna ==
The islets are part of the Port Davey Islands Important Bird Area, so identified by BirdLife International because of its importance for breeding seabirds. What vegetation there is on these rocks is dominated by Poa, pig face and ferns. Recorded breeding seabird species are the fairy prion (100 pairs), Pacific gull, silver gull and black-faced cormorant.

== See also ==
- List of islands of Tasmania
