= Mavourneen Rocks =

Islets in Tasmania, Australia

- Location within Tasmania

Geography
- Location: Port Davey
- Coordinates: 43°18′00″S 145°57′36″E
- Archipelago: Breaksea Islands Group
- Adjacent to: Southern Ocean
- Total islands: 4
- Area: 0.88 ha (2.2 acres)

Administration
- Australia
- State: Tasmania
- Region: South West

Demographics
- Population: 0

The Mavourneen Rocks is a group of four steep, rocky islets that lie within Port Davey, an oceanic inlet, located in the south west region of Tasmania, Australia. The islets have a combined area of approximately 0.88 hectares (2.2 acres) and are contained with the Southwest National Park, part of the Tasmanian Wilderness World Heritage Site and the Port Davey/Bathurst Harbour Marine Nature Reserve.

== Features and location ==
Part of the Breaksea Islands Group, the Mavourneen Rocks are part of the Port Davey Islands Important Bird Area, so identified by BirdLife International because of its importance for breeding seabirds. Recorded breeding seabird species are the little penguin (20 pairs), Pacific gull, silver gull and sooty oystercatcher.

== See also ==
- List of islands of Tasmania
