= West Pyramid =

Island in Tasmania, Australia

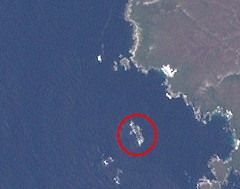
- A Landsat image of West Pyramid, circled in red.

- Location within Tasmania

Geography
- Location: South western Tasmania
- Coordinates: 43°17′24″S 145°48′36″E
- Archipelago: Trumpeter Islets Group
- Adjacent to: Southern Ocean
- Area: 2.5 ha (6.2 acres)

Administration
- Australia
- State: Tasmania
- Region: South West

Demographics
- Population: Unpopulated

West Pyramid is an unpopulated steep-sided island located close to the south-western coast of Tasmania, Australia. Situated some 1 kilometre (0.62 mi) north of the mouth of Port Davey where it meets the Southern Ocean, the 2.5-hectare (6.2-acre) island is part of the Trumpeter Islets Group, and comprises part of the Southwest National Park and the Tasmanian Wilderness World Heritage Site.

== Fauna ==
The island is part of the Port Davey Islands Important Bird Area, so identified by BirdLife International because of its importance for breeding seabirds. Recorded breeding seabird and wader species are the short-tailed shearwater (3000 pairs), fairy prion (1-2000 pairs), Pacific gull, silver gull and sooty oystercatcher. The Tasmanian tree skink is present.

== See also ==
- List of islands of Tasmania
