= Muttonbird =

Muttonbird or mutton bird may refer to species of petrel, especially shearwaters, whose young are harvested for food and other uses before they fledge in Australia and New Zealand. The English term "muttonbird" originally emerged among settlers on Norfolk Island as the strong taste and fattiness of these birds' meat was likened to mutton. The Māori name for the birds, tītī, is also widely used in New Zealand.

== Species of bird ==
- Short-tailed shearwater, nesting in south-eastern Australia, particularly in the Furneaux Islands
- Sooty shearwater, nesting mainly in New Zealand and islands in the South Atlantic Ocean
- Wedge-tailed shearwater, nesting throughout the tropical and subtropical parts of the Indian and Pacific Oceans
- Flesh-footed shearwater, nesting on Lord Howe Island

== Places ==
- Mutton Bird Island, Tasmania, Australia
  - South East Mutton Bird Islet
  - South West Mutton Bird Islet
- Titi/Muttonbird Islands, New Zealand

== Music ==
- The Mutton Birds, band from Auckland
  - The Mutton Birds (album)

== See also ==
- Muttonbirding, the capturing of muttonbird fledglings
