= Port Davey Islands Important Bird Area =

Islands in Tasmania, Australia

Coordinates: 43°21′53″S 145°56′23″E

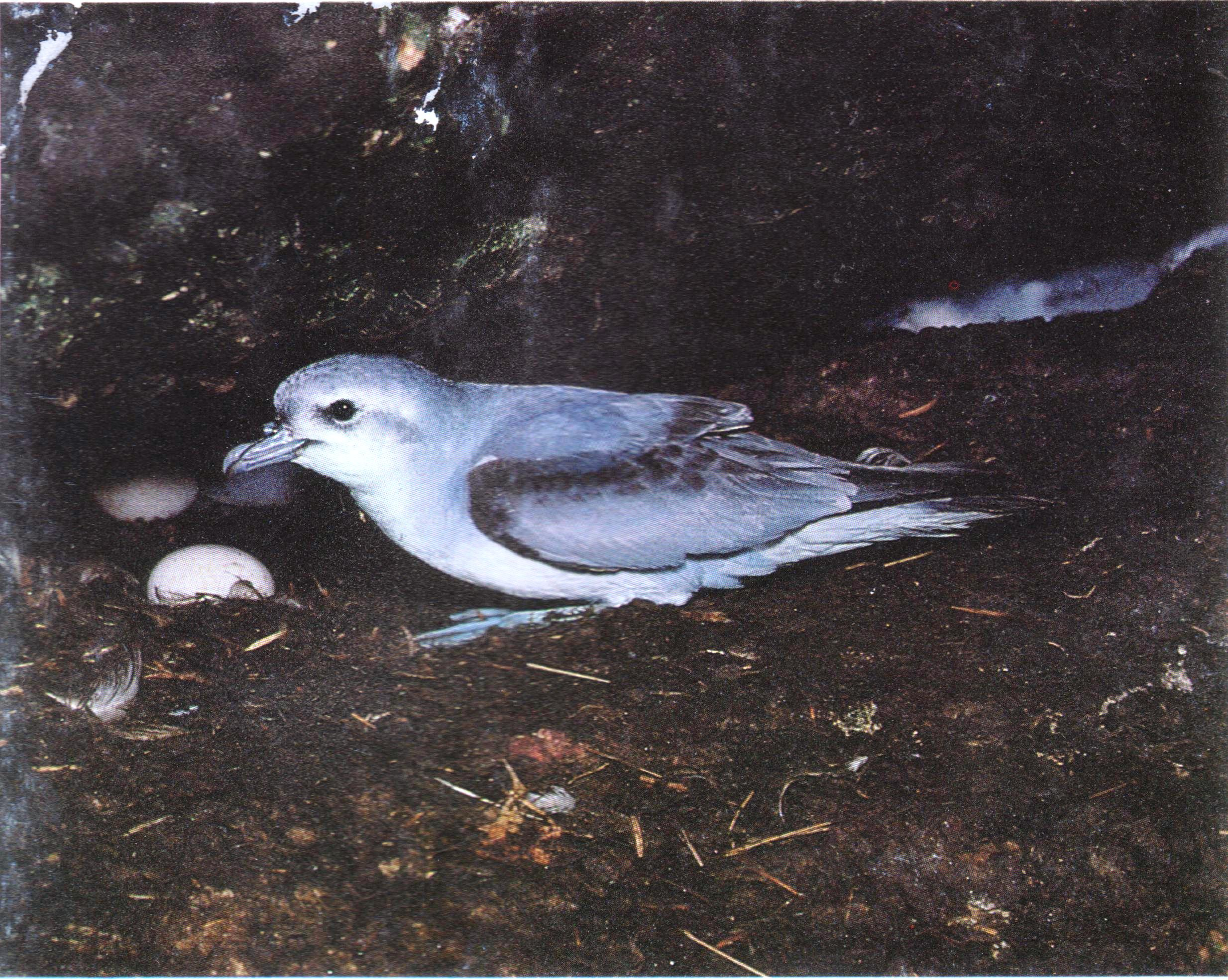
The IBA is an important breeding site for fairy prions

The Port Davey Islands Important Bird Area comprises over 20 small, rocky islands scattered both within, and in the vicinity of, the mouth of Port Davey, an inlet on the south-west coast of Tasmania, Australia. They all lie within the Southwest National Park and are important for breeding seabirds.

== Birds ==
The sparsely vegetated islands, with a collective area of 163 ha, have been identified by BirdLife International as an Important Bird Area (IBA) because together they support over 1% of the world populations of short-tailed shearwaters (c. 950,000 breeding pairs), fairy prions (c. 27,000 breeding pairs), little penguins (c. 16,500 breeding pairs) and black-faced cormorants (up to 230 breeding pairs). Pacific gulls and sooty oystercatchers also nest in the islands.

== Islands ==
Breaksea Island group

- Breaksea Islands
- Kathleen Island
- Mavourneen Rocks

Swainson Island group

- Big Caroline Rock
- Swainson Island
- Hay Island
- Shanks Islands
- Lourah Island

Mutton Bird Island group

- South East Mutton Bird Islet
- South West Mutton Bird Islet
- Mutton Bird Island
- Sugarmouse Island
- East Pyramids
- Sugarloaf Rock
- Wendar Island
- Wild Wind Islets

Trumpeter Islets group

- The Coffee Pot
- West Pyramid
- Trumpeter Islets
- Hobbs Island
