= South West Mutton Bird Islet =

Islet on south west coast of Tasmania, Australia

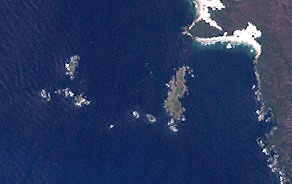
- A Landsat image of the Mutton Bird Islands Group.

- Location within Tasmania

Geography
- Location: South western Tasmania
- Coordinates: 43°25′S 145°58′E
- Archipelago: Mutton Bird Islands Group
- Adjacent to: Southern Ocean
- Area: 0.52 ha (1.3 acres)
- Highest elevation: 28 m (92 ft)

Administration
- Australia
- State: Tasmania
- Region: South West

Demographics
- Population: Unpopulated

South West Mutton Bird Islet is a dome-shaped unpopulated islet located close to the south-western coast of Tasmania, Australia. Situated some 2 kilometres (1.2 mi) south of where the mouth of Port Davey meets the Southern Ocean, the 0.52-hectare (1.3-acre) islet is one of the eight islands that comprise the Mutton Bird Islands Group. The South West Mutton Bird Islet is part of the Southwest National Park and the Tasmanian Wilderness World Heritage Site.

The highest point of Mutton Bird Island is 28 metres (92 ft) above sea level.

== Fauna ==
The islet is part of the Port Davey Islands Important Bird Area, so identified by BirdLife International because of its importance for breeding seabirds. Recorded breeding seabird species are the short-tailed shearwater, (1000 pairs) and fairy prion (200 pairs).

== See also ==
- List of islands of Tasmania
