= Muttonbird Island =

Muttonbird Island may refer to:

- Muttonbird Island Nature Reserve, New South Wales, Australia
- Muttonbird Island (Lord Howe Island), offshore island of Lord Howe Island, New South Wales, Australia
- One of The Twelve Apostles (Victoria) in Australia
- Mutton Bird Island, Tasmania, Australia
- Shelter Island (Western Australia), also known as Muttonbird Island

== See also ==
- Tītī / Muttonbird Islands, New Zealand
