= Mutton Bird Island =

Island in Tasmania, Australia

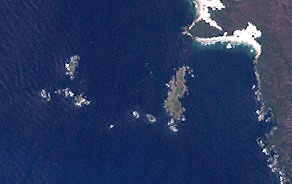
- A Landsat image of the Mutton Bird Islands Group; the Mutton Bird Island is the largest island that is located closest to the coast.

- Location within Tasmania

Geography
- Location: South western Tasmania
- Coordinates: 43°25′12″S 145°57′58″E
- Archipelago: Mutton Bird Islands Group
- Adjacent to: Southern Ocean
- Area: 44 ha (110 acres)
- Highest elevation: 40 m (130 ft)

Administration
- Australia
- State: Tasmania
- Region: South West

Demographics
- Population: Unpopulated

Mutton Bird Island is an irregularly shaped unpopulated island located close to the south-western coast of Tasmania, Australia. Situated some 2 kilometres (1.2 mi) south of where the mouth of Port Davey meets the Southern Ocean, the 44-hectare (110-acre) is the largest of the eight islands that comprise the Mutton Bird Islands Group. The Mutton Bird Island is part of the Southwest National Park and the Tasmanian Wilderness World Heritage Site.

The highest point of Mutton Bird Island is 40 metres (130 ft) above sea level.

== Fauna ==
The island is part of the Port Davey Islands Important Bird Area, so identified by BirdLife International because of its importance for breeding seabirds. Recorded breeding seabird and wader species are the little penguin (3,000 pairs), short-tailed shearwater, (530,000 pairs), fairy prion (2,500 pairs), Pacific gull, silver gull and sooty oystercatcher. Reptiles present are the metallic skink and Tasmanian tree skink.

== See also ==
- List of islands of Tasmania
