= Davey River =

River in Tasmania, Australia

Davey
- Location of the Davey River mouth in Tasmania

Location
- Country: Australia
- State: Tasmania
- Region: South-west

Physical characteristics
- Source: Frankland Range
  - location: below Coronation Peak
  - coordinates: 42°53′27″S 145°59′40″E
  - elevation: 227 m (745 ft)
- Mouth: Southern Ocean
  - location: Port Davey
  - coordinates: 43°12′46″S 145°56′14″E
  - elevation: 0 m (0 ft)
- Length: 53 km (33 mi)

Basin features
- Tributaries
  - left: Lora River (Tasmania), Frankland River (Southwest Tasmania), Crossing River
  - right: Hardwood River, De Witt River
- National park: Southwest National Park

The Davey River is a perennial river in the south-west region of Tasmania, Australia.

== Course and features ==
The Davey River rises on the western slopes of the Frankland Range, below Coronation Peak, and flows generally south by west through the Southwest National Park, joined by ten tributaries including the Lora, Frankland, Hardwood, Crossing, and De Witt rivers. The river reaches its mouth in Payne Bay, an inner part of Port Davey, and empties out into the Southern Ocean. The river descends 228 metres (748 ft) over its 53-kilometre (33 mi) course.

A section of the lower Davey River gorge is known as Hells Gates, - providing confusion with the entry to Macquarie Harbour which has an entrance by the same name - Hells Gates.

== See also ==
- Rivers of Tasmania
