= South East Mutton Bird Islet =

Islet on south west coast of Tasmania, Australia

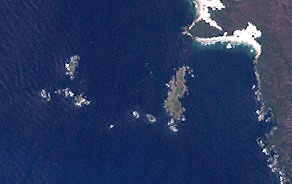
- A Landsat image of the Mutton Bird Islands Group.

- Location within Tasmania

Geography
- Location: South western Tasmania
- Coordinates: 43°25′S 145°58′E
- Archipelago: Mutton Bird Islands Group
- Adjacent to: Southern Ocean
- Area: 0.52 ha (1.3 acres)

Administration
- Australia
- State: Tasmania
- Region: South West

Demographics
- Population: Unpopulated

UNESCO World Heritage Site
- Criteria: Cultural: iii, iv, vi, vii; natural: viii, ix, x
- Reference: 181
- Inscription: 1982 (6th Session)

South East Mutton Bird Islet is a steep unpopulated islet located close to the south-western coast of Tasmania, Australia. Situated 2 kilometres (1.2 mi) south of where the mouth of Port Davey meets the Southern Ocean, the 0.52-hectare (1.3-acre) islet is one of the eight islands that comprise the Mutton Bird Islands Group. The South East Mutton Bird Islet is part of the Southwest National Park and the Tasmanian Wilderness World Heritage Site.

== Fauna ==
The islet is part of the Port Davey Islands Important Bird Area, so identified by BirdLife International because of its importance for breeding seabirds. Recorded breeding seabird species are the short-tailed shearwater (250 pairs), fairy prion (1000 pairs), black-faced cormorant and silver gull.

== See also ==
- List of islands of Tasmania
