= Helsham Inquiry =

Australian commission of inquiry

The Helsham Inquiry was a 1987 commission of inquiry, under the Australian government, into the management of the Tasmanian forests and the incorporation of these areas into the Tasmanian Wilderness World Heritage Area. It was directed by New South Wales judge Michael Helsham and supported by the government of Bob Hawke.

== Background ==
During the 1980s, Tasmania was the site of expanding logging plans. In response to this, a protest was staged at Farmhouse Creek in February 1987, leading to a police dispersion of the protestors. Bob Hawke, at the time Prime Minister of Australia, did not want his popularity to slide further due to this, and so in June, the Helsham Inquiry was launched under former New South Wales judge Michael Helsham. Hawke later won the 1987 elections, partly due to help from his environmentalist platform.

== Inquiry ==
The Helsham Inquiry focused on the World Heritage listing of the Lemonthyme and Southern forests in Tasmania. Only one of the three commissioners in the Helsham Inquiry, Hitchcock, were actually interested in conservation. Bob Brown predicted that, as a result, the inquiry would be a "win for the companies, the chainsaws, the cable loggers, and the woodchip mills." Two of the commissioners, Wallace and Helsham, did not understand much of the information being given to them by the 11 environmental experts present.

The Helsham Inquiry was a key point of tension between the state government of Tasmania under Robin Gray and the federal government under Hawke. It was deemed that no logging would take place during the inquiry, something that was regarded as "an act of war" by Gray. As a result, Gray was prepared to not allow the three commissioners into the forests, allowing them to be arrested if they ever entered. Hawke flew spy planes over the forests in the case of the dispute being brought to the Australian High Court.

The results of the Helsham Inquiry were split, with two of the three commissioners recommending only adding 8% of the land in question to the National Estate. However, the Hitchcock minority report view, that 70% (282,000 hectares) should be added, won after a cabinet debate taking 14 hours over the span of weeks and the amount of land was later increased to 80%. The Tasmanian government was given compensation, including 50 million Australian dollars and multiple concessions. However, both the logging industry and conservationists were unsatisfied with the result.

In 1989, the Tasmanian Wilderness World Heritage Area was expanded as a result of the Helsham Inquiry.
