= Tasmanian Wilderness World Heritage Area =

UNESCO World Heritage Site in Tasmania

Tasmanian Wilderness
UNESCO World Heritage Site
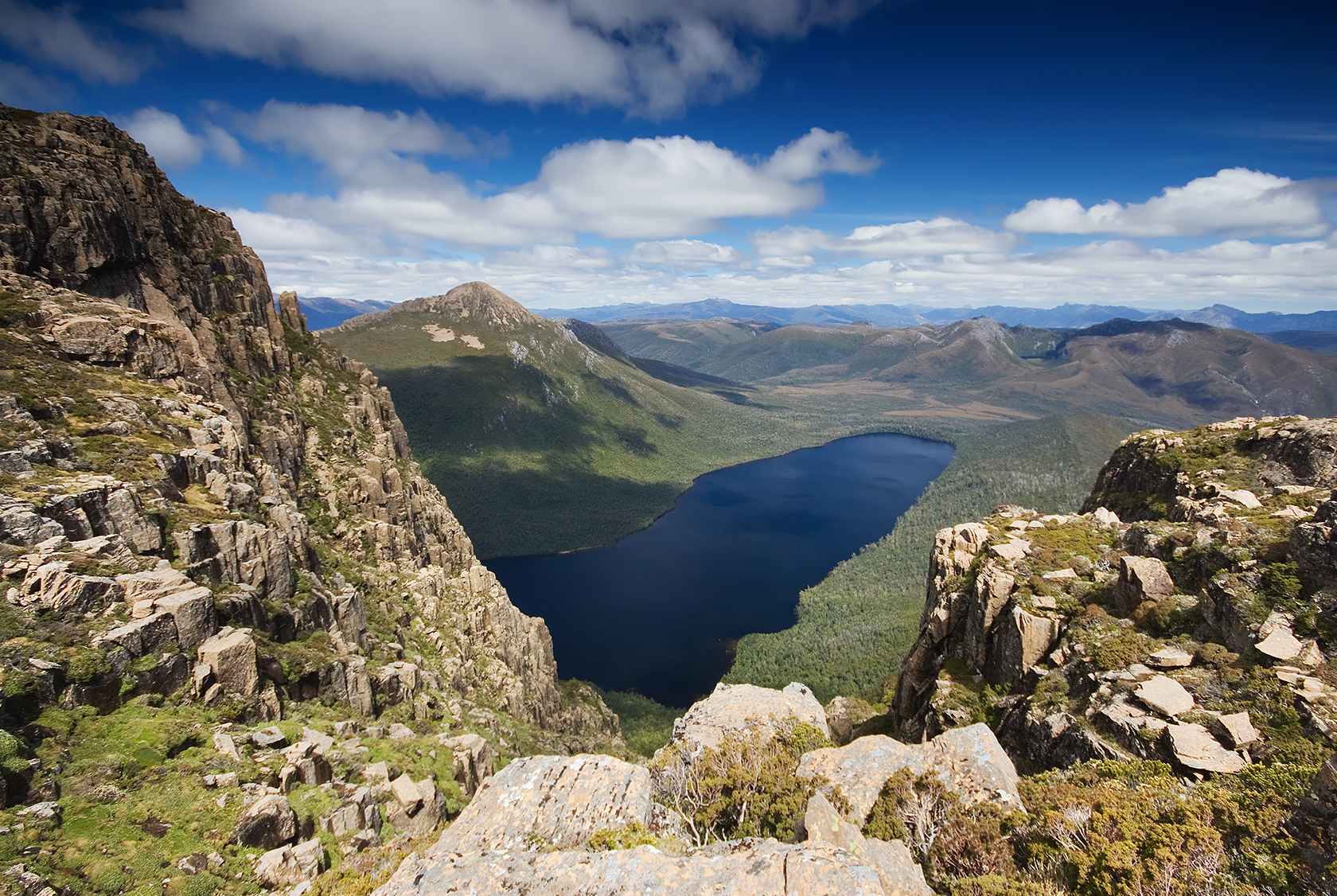
- Lake Judd from Mount Eliza, Southwest National Park
- Interactive map of Tasmanian Wilderness
- Location: Tasmania, Australia
- Criteria: Cultural: iii, iv, vi; natural: vii, viii, ix, x
- Reference: 181
- Inscription: 1982 (6th Session)
- Extensions: 1989
- Area: 1,584,233 ha (3,914,720 acres)
- Coordinates: 42.5957°S 146.1729°E
- Tasmanian Wilderness World Heritage Area

The Tasmanian Wilderness World Heritage Area, abbreviated to TWWHA, is a World Heritage Site in Tasmania, Australia. It is one of the largest conservation areas in Australia, covering 15,800 km^{2} (6,100 mi^{2}), or almost 25 per cent of Tasmania. It is also one of the last expanses of temperate wilderness in the world, and includes the South West Wilderness.

The main industry of the TWWHA is tourism, yet the region has a lack of development partially due to the juxtaposition of development with the idea of pristine nature. There is no permanent habitation in the area save for small parts on the periphery. The region is known for activities such as bushwalking, whitewater rafting, and climbing.

The Tasmanian Wilderness qualifies for 7 out of the 10 classification criteria evaluated for World Heritage. Along with Mount Tai in China, it is the highest measurement attained for World Heritage Site status on Earth.

The TWWHA was first placed on the World Heritage List in 1982 under joint arrangements between the federal government of Australia and the Tasmanian government during the Franklin Dam controversy, and expanded in 1989 following the Helsham Inquiry, a decision to protect a eucalypt forest from logging. Due to the subpar planning and management of the area during the 1990s, a management plan was drawn up and promulgated in 1992, further replaced by a new management plan in 1999. In 2014, the Abbott government proposed de-listing the Tasmanian Wilderness as a World Heritage Site so as to allow the logging of trees within the protected area. This was rejected by the World Heritage Committee the same year. In 2016, the Tasmanian government withdrew the bid to allow logging in the Tasmanian Wilderness after a UNESCO report opposed the idea.

== Background ==
Tasmania is one of the states of Australia. It is an island in the Southern Ocean, immediately south of mainland Australia, the Bass Strait separating them. It has a temperate maritime climate, substantially different from most of mainland Australia. Australia has 21 World Heritage Sites, the first of which was listed in 1981. The best known are Kakadu, Uluru (formerly known as Ayers Rock) and the Great Barrier Reef. The Tasmanian Wilderness is probably the best known of the rest.

Tasmania is approximately 296 km (184 mi) north to south and 315 km (196 mi) east to west, and about 300 km (190 mi) south of mainland Australia. Around 30 per cent of the state's land is reserved under some category of conservation land tenure. The Tasmanian Wilderness covers approximately 20 per cent of the state. It comprises Tasmania's four largest national parks and several smaller areas of various other conservation land tenures. 3.4 million hectares out of the 6.8 million hectares of Tasmanian land is covered by forest, 70 per cent of which is in public land, 40 per cent in commercial forests, and 30 per cent on protected public land. Tasmania has a population just under 500,000. It has the weakest economy of all the Australian states, and tourism is seen as one of the few economic growth areas. Tasmania's tourism marketing promotes ecotourism based on the state's natural values; particularly those of the Tasmanian Wilderness. This puts considerable environmental pressure on the Tasmanian Wilderness even though most tourist accommodation is outside the boundaries and most tourism occurs at a few well-developed sites near the periphery of the area.

== Geography ==
The Tasmanian Wilderness is an extensive, wet, temperate, wilderness area covering much of southern and western Tasmania. It is approximately 200 km (120 mi) north to south and averages 70 km (43 mi) east to west, or 1.38 million ha (3.4 million acres) before expansions in 2013. The area of the region became 15,800 kilometres^{2}, or almost 25% of Tasmania after extensions in 1989 and 2013. Although the highest point is only 1,600 metres (5,000 feet) above sea level and there is no year-round snow cover, much of the area is very rugged and contains the only extensive, recently glaciated areas in Australia. The last glaciation ended 10,000 to 12,000 years ago. It constitutes one of the last expanses of temperate wilderness in the world, and includes the South West Wilderness.

=== Climate ===
The conservation area experiences an oceanic climate (Köppen: Cfb) with cool, drier summers and cold, drizzly winters. The wettest recorded day was 10 August 2007 with 87.6 mm (3.45 in) of rainfall. Cooled by its altitude, the Tasmanian Wilderness' extreme temperatures ranged from 37.4 °C (99.3 °F) on 31 January 2020 to −4.3 °C (24.3 °F) on 13 September 2013.

A weather station opened in 2004 at Warra. It records climate data for temperature and precipitation.

Climate data for Warra (43.06°S 146.70°E) (495 m (1,624 ft) AMSL) (2004-2025)
Month	Jan	Feb	Mar	Apr	May	Jun	Jul	Aug	Sep	Oct	Nov	Dec	Year
Record high °C (°F)	37.4 (99.3)	34.0 (93.2)	35.1 (95.2)	25.6 (78.1)	20.8 (69.4)	15.5 (59.9)	16.0 (60.8)	20.3 (68.5)	25.0 (77.0)	27.7 (81.9)	30.2 (86.4)	35.4 (95.7)	37.4 (99.3)
Mean daily maximum °C (°F)	19.8 (67.6)	18.9 (66.0)	17.0 (62.6)	13.6 (56.5)	11.1 (52.0)	9.2 (48.6)	8.7 (47.7)	9.6 (49.3)	11.3 (52.3)	13.6 (56.5)	15.7 (60.3)	17.6 (63.7)	13.8 (56.9)
Mean daily minimum °C (°F)	8.5 (47.3)	8.3 (46.9)	7.6 (45.7)	6.0 (42.8)	4.7 (40.5)	3.2 (37.8)	2.7 (36.9)	2.7 (36.9)	3.5 (38.3)	4.4 (39.9)	5.9 (42.6)	7.0 (44.6)	5.4 (41.7)
Record low °C (°F)	0.5 (32.9)	0.5 (32.9)	−1.3 (29.7)	−2.5 (27.5)	−3.3 (26.1)	−3.4 (25.9)	−3.7 (25.3)	−3.9 (25.0)	−4.3 (24.3)	−2.7 (27.1)	−1.9 (28.6)	0.3 (32.5)	−4.3 (24.3)
Average precipitation mm (inches)	88.0 (3.46)	72.6 (2.86)	100.4 (3.95)	117.6 (4.63)	164.0 (6.46)	134.4 (5.29)	181.0 (7.13)	231.0 (9.09)	212.3 (8.36)	183.8 (7.24)	127.5 (5.02)	136.5 (5.37)	1,747.5 (68.80)
Average precipitation days (≥ 0.2 mm)	16.7	14.3	18.4	19.0	22.6	22.7	24.2	25.5	23.7	23.0	19.6	19.0	248.7
Source: Bureau of Meteorology (2004-2025)

== Development and tourism ==
The Tasmanian Wilderness contains no permanent human habitation, apart from a small amount of accommodation near the periphery. Few roads penetrate the area. There is also a trout fishery (introduced northern hemisphere species) in the Central Plateau lakes. Unlike most of the rest of the Tasmanian Wilderness, the Central Plateau section has a long history of use by local people. As well as fishing, some hunting, horse riding, four-wheel-driving and associated hut use continues. These established practices are seen by some groups to be at odds with achieving conservation outcomes. This has led to the removal of roads, huts, and any other human traces in favor of the idea of a pristine wilderness.

Tourism and recreation is the predominant industry in the area. There are about half a million visitors to the TWWHA annually. Activities within the TWWHA include cruises, commercial flights and landings, bushwalking (it has been described as the Mecca of bushwalkers in Australia), whitewater rafting, and climbing. More remote regions of the TWWHA have no ports, and thus expedition ships are used for land-based activities. However, due to management guidelines in the TWWHA, the region remains rarely visited by these ships, though there are also smaller commercial ships in the area.

== Biology ==
=== Flora ===
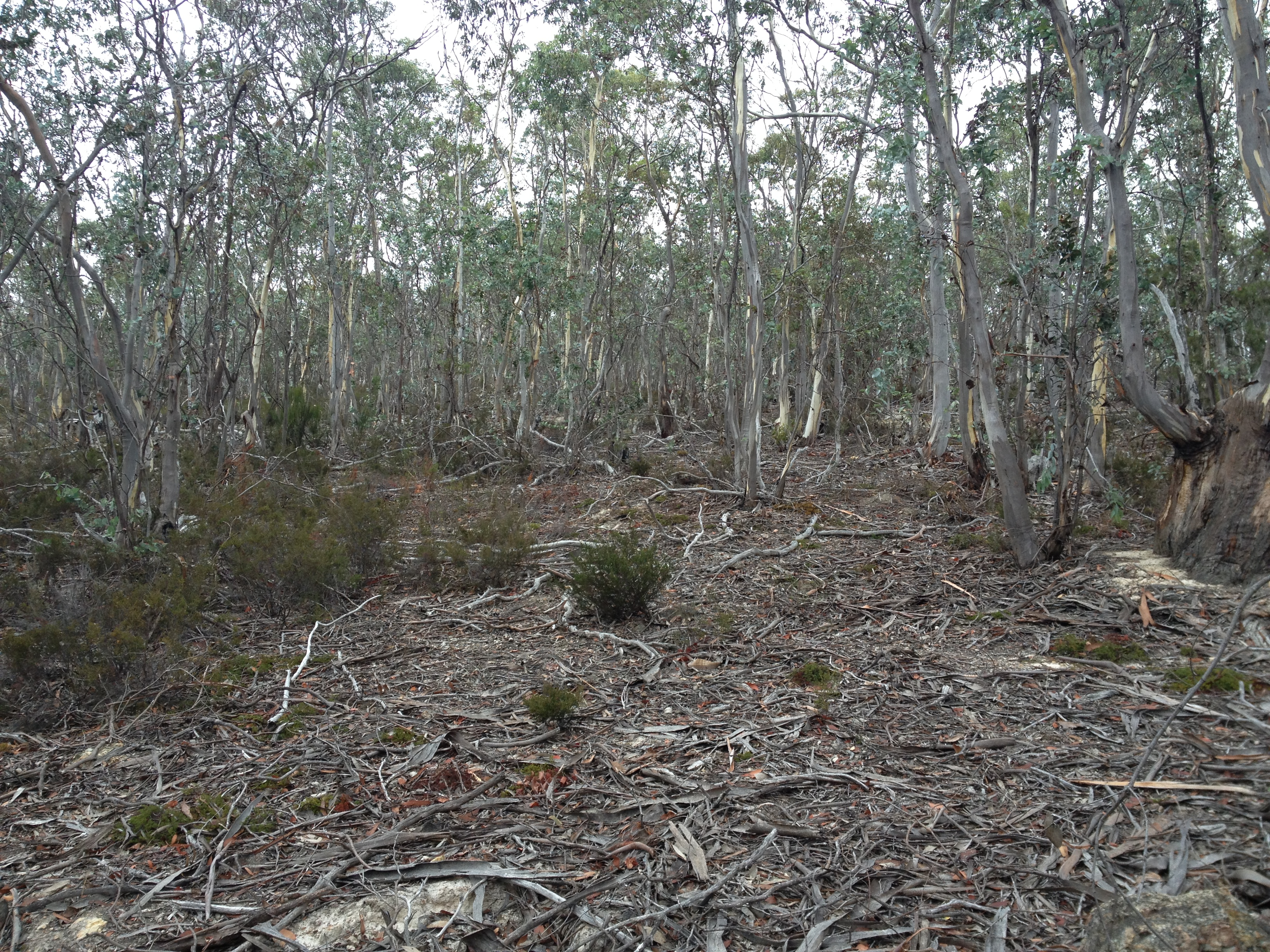
Dry sclerophyll forest in Tasmania

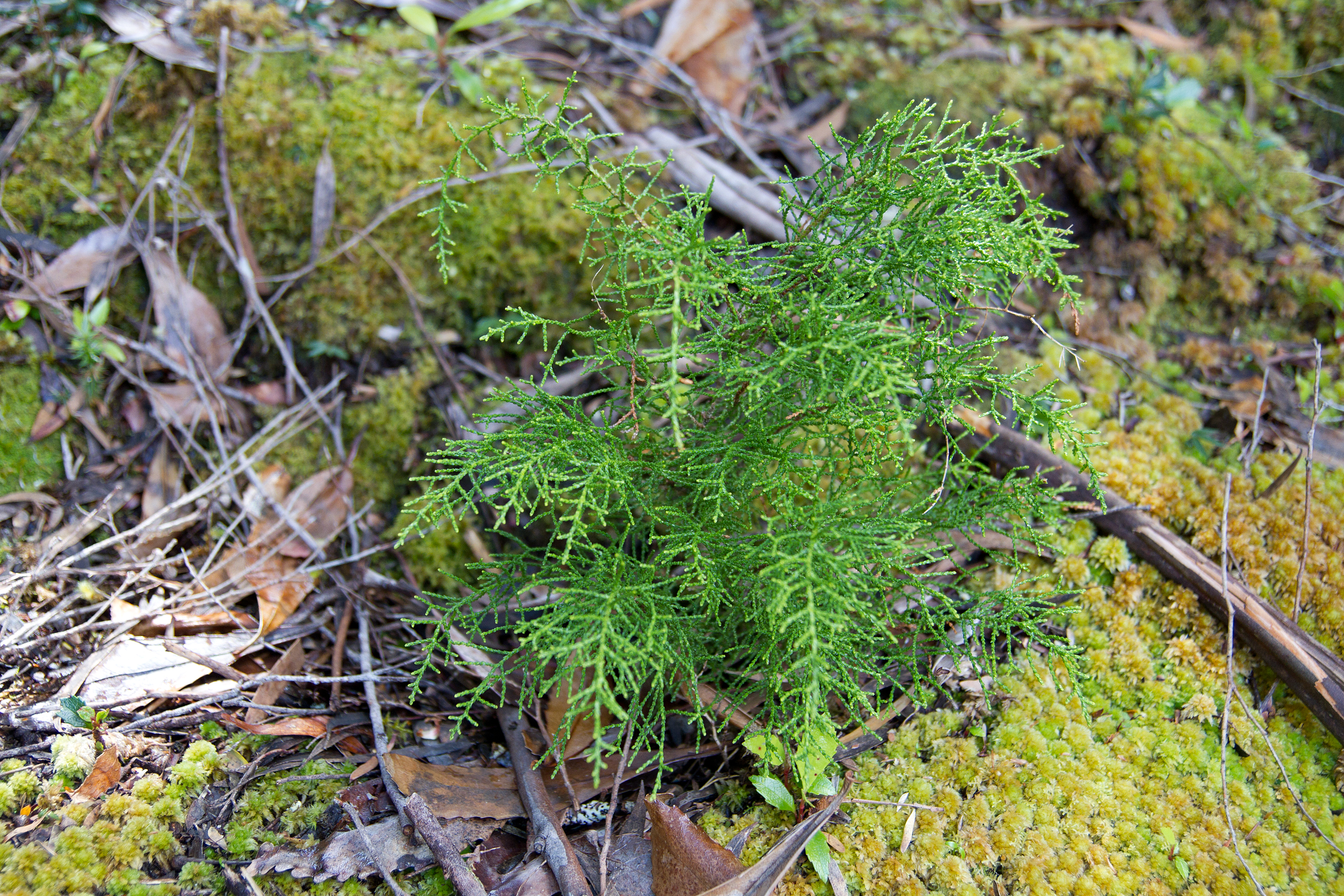
Lagarostrobos franklinii: a slow growing tree found only in the wilderness area

The TWWHA is located in the Australasian realm. One of the supporting factors for its listing as a World Heritage Site is its biodiversity and natural qualities. There are six ecosystem groups in the TWWHA - rainforest, sclerophyll communities, alpine treeless vegetation, subalpine treeless vegetation, and wetland communities. The TWWHA includes many species of ancient origin, primitive taxa, and a high degree of plant diversity, with unusual features such as scleromorphic shrubs evolving in a maritime climate in alpine and subalpine treeless ecosystems. The TWWHA also contains the longest continuous pollen record in Australia at the Darwin Crater.

=== Fauna ===
The TWWHA includes 1,397 species from 293 families. There are 30 species of terrestrial mammals, 120 species of terrestrial birds, 14 species of terrestrial reptiles, seven species of frogs, 16 species of freshwater fish, and 68 species of marine fish. Much of the fauna found within the TWWHA is unique to the area, such as the Moss Froglet and the Pedra Branca Skink. In terms of invertebrates, the TWWHA includes 904 species of Uniramia, 179 species of Chelicerata, 90 species of Aschelminthes, 88 species of Crustacea, 69 species of Mollusca, 57 species of Annelida, eight species of Platyhelminthes, and one species each for Onychophora and Nemertea.

== History ==
=== Pre 20th century ===
Mainland Australia and Tasmania were once connected by a land bridge up until at least 14,000 years ago.

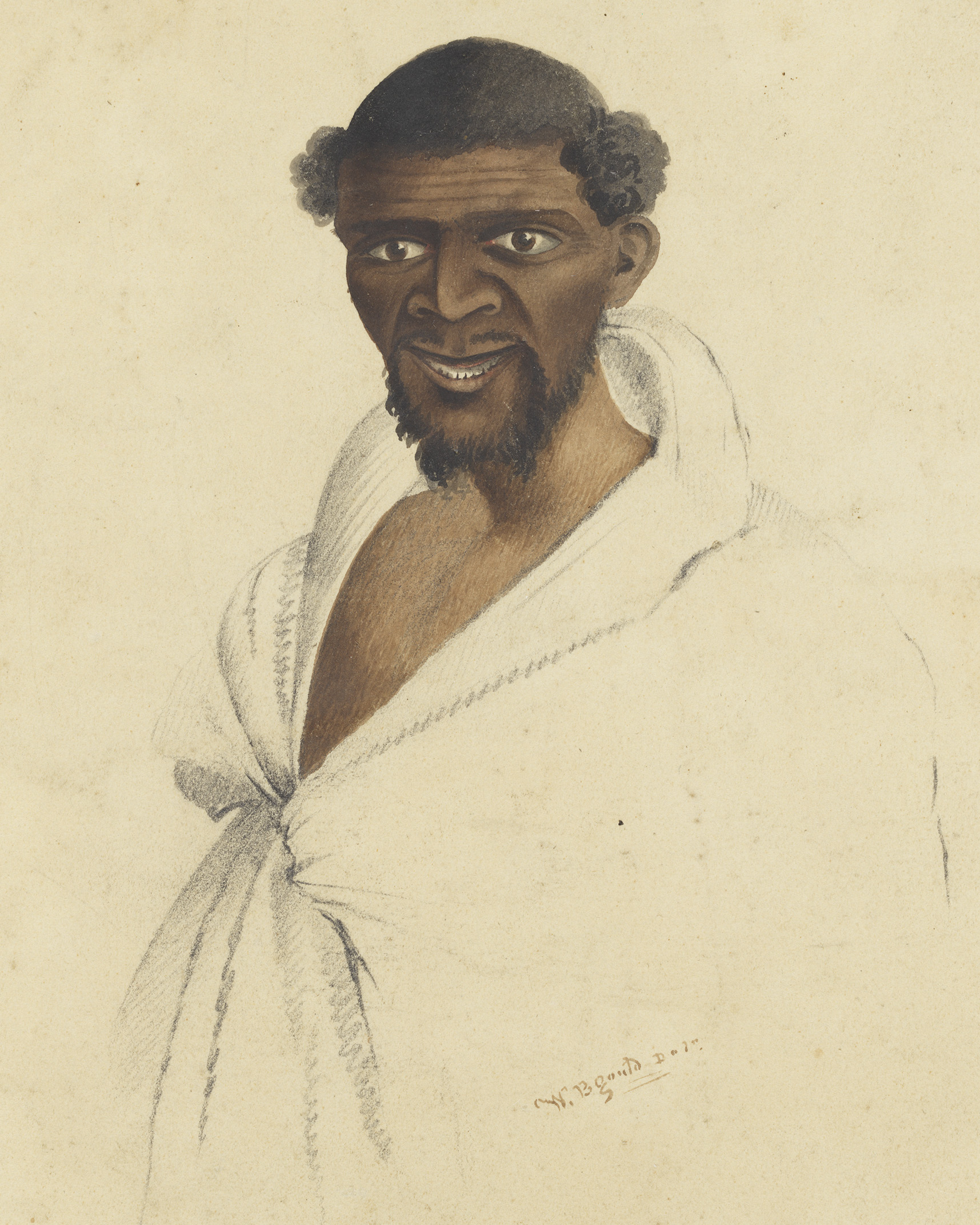
Towterer, an Aboriginal Tasmanian man from the Port Davey region

The Tasmanian Wilderness, a network of parks and reserves with steep gorges, underwent severe glaciation. Human remains dating back more than 20,000 years have been found in limestone caves in the area. The area was used for millennia by Aboriginal Tasmanians, who have left their signature on the area in the form of an ecology strongly influenced by their burning practices, as well as physical remains including middens and artwork. The Aboriginal presence in the area dates back to the Pleistocene, 35,000 years ago. Middens from the Holocene have been found in the area. The Aboriginal people were removed from the region during the 1830s by George Augustus Robinson, acting under the policies of the local colonial British government. Although Indigenous people no longer live permanently in the area, some places are of great significance to the present-day Aboriginal Tasmanian community, which influenced the region's listing as a World Heritage Site. Historically, the area was extensively explored and prospected during the 19th century, with a history of convicts in the area, but the only economic activity in the area has been small-scale mining and logging, a limited amount of trapping (for furs) and, in a limited area, grazing, which continued until very recently. The area also contains one large and several smaller hydroelectric schemes. Apart from the hydroelectric impoundments, none of these activities have left much lasting trace.

=== World heritage status ===
==== 1980s ====
The area was placed on the World Heritage List in two stages, in 1982 and 1989. The 1982 listing came in the midst of a political furore over the proposed construction of a major hydroelectric dam within the area. Construction of the dam did not proceed as a result of federal government intervention using authority obtained as a result of the World Heritage listing. The factors influencing its listing include the Aboriginal heritage of the site, geomorphic values, and biodiversity.

The area was expanded in 1989 as a result of the Helsham Inquiry, a decision to protect a major area of tall eucalypt forest from logging. This began a conflict regarding further inclusion of areas - the majority opinion stated that only five areas deserved to be listed, while the differing view was that there were additional areas to those five, ending up in an additional 600,000 hectares. The latter of these views later prevailed, ending in the expansion of the area greatly. In the same year, the region was given a statutory management plan. Again, the area's World Heritage status gave the federal government the right to be involved, and reinforced the perception in some sections of the Tasmanian community that World Heritage listing was a ploy to give the federal government the right to intervene in land management issues which would otherwise be a matter for the state government alone.

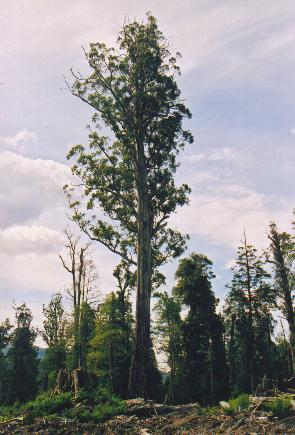
An at least 80 metre tall Tasmanian Eucalyptus regnans nicknamed "El grande", which was accidentally burned in 2003

During the 1980s, the funding of the management of the area was greatly increased from around 1 million Australian dollars in the early 1980s to 3 million by the middle of the decade. In the mid-1990s, funding reached 9 million dollars, while the budget reached 11 million in 2008. This increase in funding importantly allowed for the employment of more staff.

There was also serious distrust of the Parks and Wildlife Service in some quarters, mostly dating back to when the Central Plateau was added to the Tasmanian Wilderness in 1989. Many established practitioners had been led to believe that all activities that had previously been permitted within the area would be allowed to continue after World Heritage listing. Soon after listing, some of their more environmentally unacceptable activities were restricted or banned to reflect the new status of the area (for example, several four-wheel-drive tracks into sensitive areas were closed). This resulted in a polarisation of strongly held views in the Tasmanian community on the future management of the area and, in some quarters, considerable antagonism towards the Parks and Wildlife Service. Many people in the local communities were affected by the little consideration they got from "Wilderness ideology", leading to their acting against good management practices due to their mistrust of the Parks and Wildlife Service.

==== 1990s ====
In 1990, planning for the area was still poorly coordinated. Only one of the four major national parks had a finalised management plan and, although plans were in varying stages of completion for several other parts of the Tasmanian Wilderness, the decision was made to prepare a single management plan for the entire area. Several stages of public comment, accompanied at times by considerable controversy in the local media, led to a very "pro-wilderness" draft management plan. A series of last-minute alterations to the plan, following a change of state government and after the closure of public comment, diluted the "pro-wilderness" nature of the plan and thereby antagonised the conservation lobby, but defused many of the strongly felt objections of established users, some of whom had threatened civil disobedience in relation to some plan prescriptions. However, some of these stakeholders, particularly local communities adjacent to the area, felt that their input to the planning process had been ignored and remained fundamentally dissatisfied with aspects of the plan, which was finalised in September 1992. Some aspects of the 1992 plan met with poor acceptance from "established practitioners" from the start, and some other problems (such as the absence of a mechanism to assess new development proposals) became apparent as the plan was implemented. Nevertheless, it guided management of the area for the next seven years, two years longer than its intended life.

The 1992 plan helped develop a framework by which to gauge the effectiveness of management plans. Under Dr. Helen Hocking, the achievement of the plan's objectives was evaluated. The plan was criticised as treating "wilderness" as the most important value of the region and disregarding all other values The Parks and Wildlife Service was determined to overcome a number of the ongoing issues identified from the 1992 plan so, in 1994, the decision was made to review the plan with the aim of having the new plan in place by September 1997. This deadline was not met for a variety of reasons, including state and federal elections that delayed key approval processes. The new plan took effect in March 1999. The most controversial management issues dealt with in the development of the new plan were those related to tourism, established practices and fire management; the key nature conservation question being whether land managers should actively use fire to maintain the diversity of the ecosystem. The plan also added into consideration Aboriginal cultural heritage and tourism.

==== 21st century ====
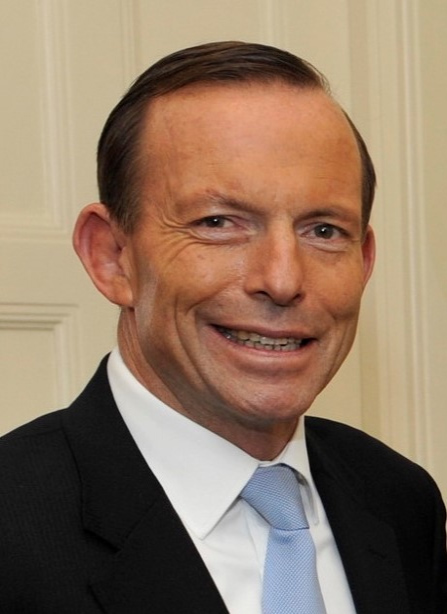
The government under Tony Abbott proposed delisting the heritage area in 2014.

In September 2004, the first State of the Tasmanian Wilderness World Heritage Area Report was released, which focused on ecological protection.

Despite advising the UN World Heritage Committee (WHC) in 2010 that it had no intention to extend the property any further, the federal government submitted a proposal for a minor boundary modification to the property in January 2013 which was accepted at the 37th session of the WHC in June 2013.

In 2014, the Abbott government proposed de-listing the Tasmanian Wilderness as a World Heritage Site so as to allow the logging of trees within the protected area. If successful, the proposal would have marked the first time a developed nation had de-listed a site for economic purposes. The proposal was rejected by the 38th Session of the World Heritage Committee in June 2014, which met in Doha, Qatar. The Abbott government stated after that it intended to respect the decision of the committee.

In 2016, the Tasmanian government withdrew the bid to allow logging in the Tasmanian Wilderness after a UNESCO report opposed the idea, despite UNESCO World Heritage procedures allowing for such an activity.

== Management ==
In Australia, land management is the responsibility of the states. However, the World Heritage Convention is an international agreement, signed by the federal government. This gives the federal government a role in the management of Australia's World Heritage Areas. The area's World Heritage status also results in Tasmania receiving considerable federal funding for management of the area.

The TWWHA is managed jointly by the federal government and the state of Tasmania through the Tasmanian Parks and Wildlife Service. The arrangements developed between Tasmania and the federal government include organizations such as the Tasmanian Wilderness World Heritage Area Ministerial Council, a Steanding Committee, and the Tasmanian Wilderness World Heritage Area Consultative Committee, of which half of its members are appointed by the Tasmanian state government while the other half is appointed by the federal government.

== National parks ==
The following national parks and reserves make up the Tasmanian Wilderness World Heritage Area:

- Central Plateau Conservation and Protected Areas
- Cradle Mountain-Lake St Clair National Park
- Devils Gullet State Reserve
- Franklin-Gordon Wild Rivers National Park
- Hartz Mountains National Park
- Mole Creek Karst National Park
- South East Mutton Bird Islet
- Southwest National Park
- Walls of Jerusalem National Park
- Mt Field National Park
Panoramas of the Tasmanian Wilderness World Heritage Area

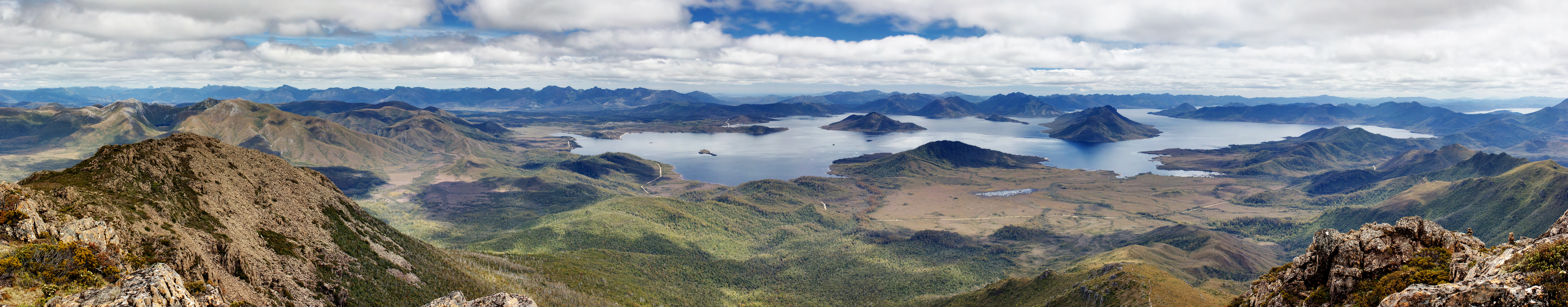
Lake Pedder from Mount Eliza, Southwest National Park

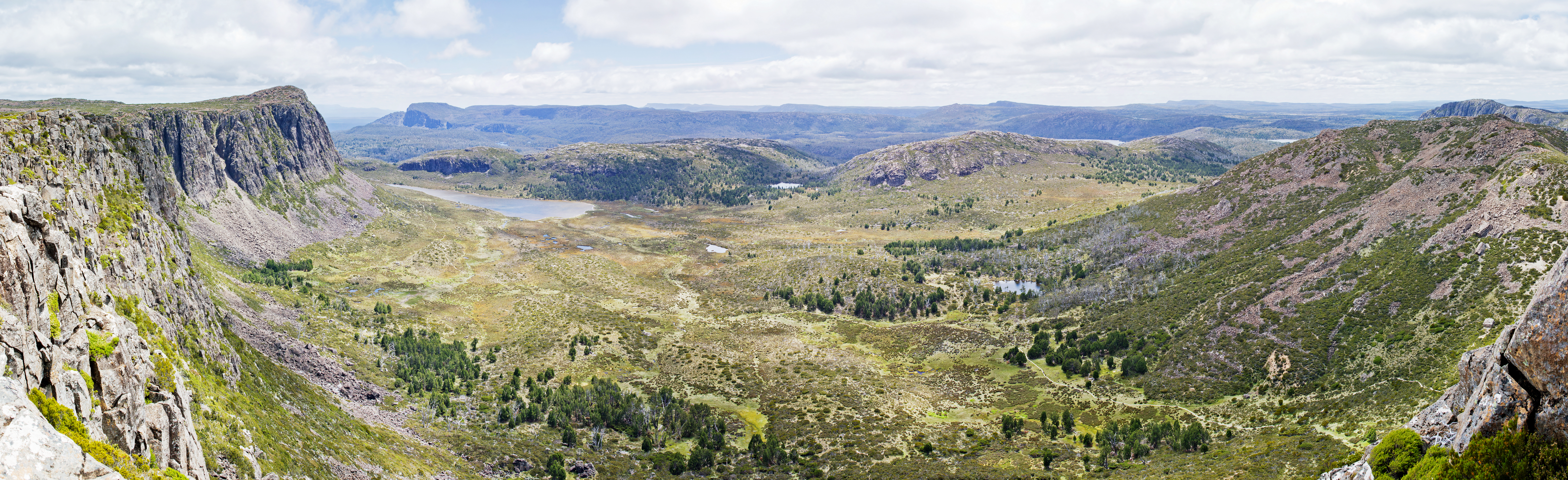
View from Solomon's Throne, Walls of Jerusalem

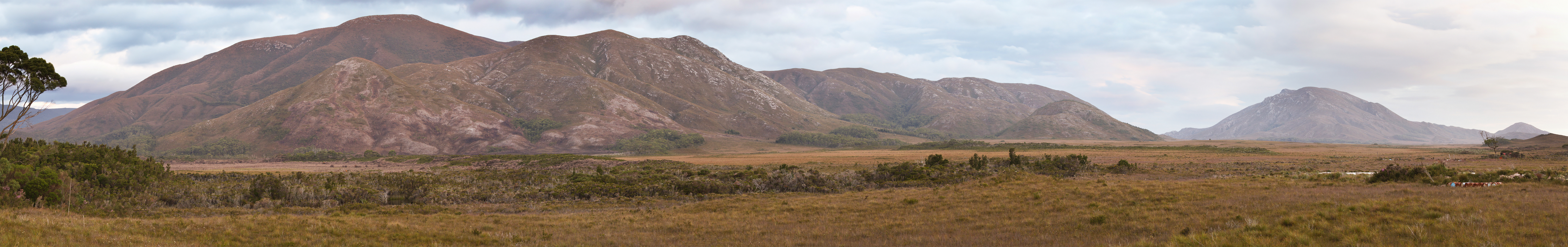
Bathurst Range, near Melaleuca, Southwest

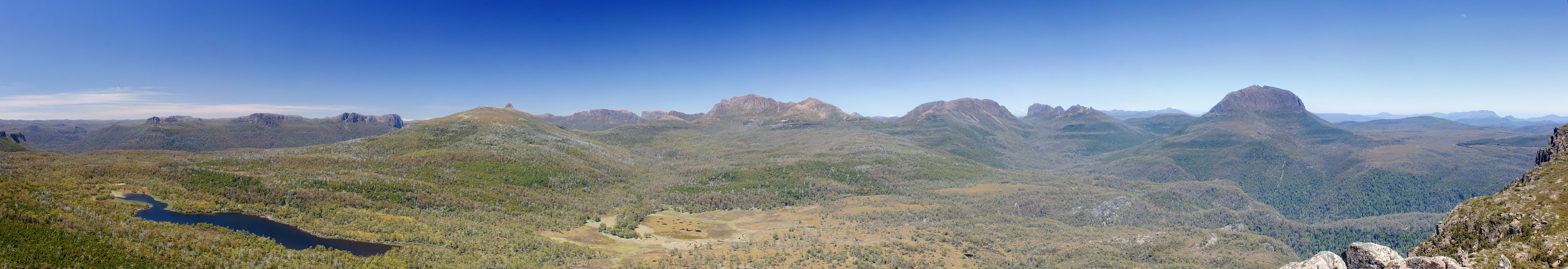
Pelion Range from Mount Oakleigh, Lake St Clair National Park

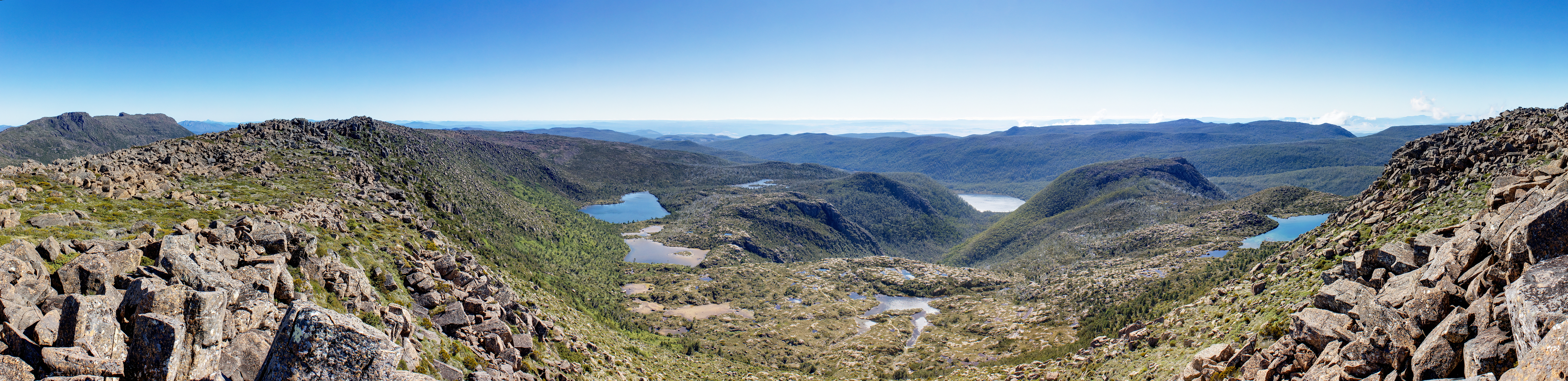
Tarn Shelf, Mount Field National Park

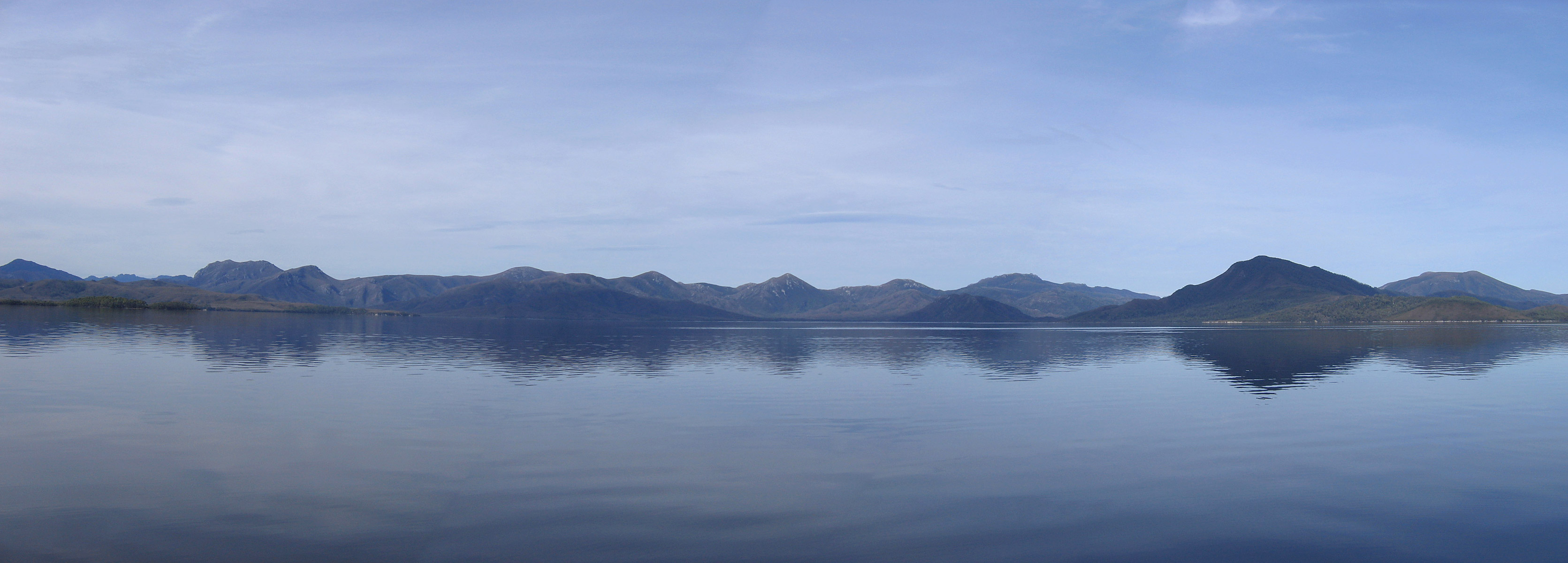
Bathurst Harbour, Southwest Wilderness

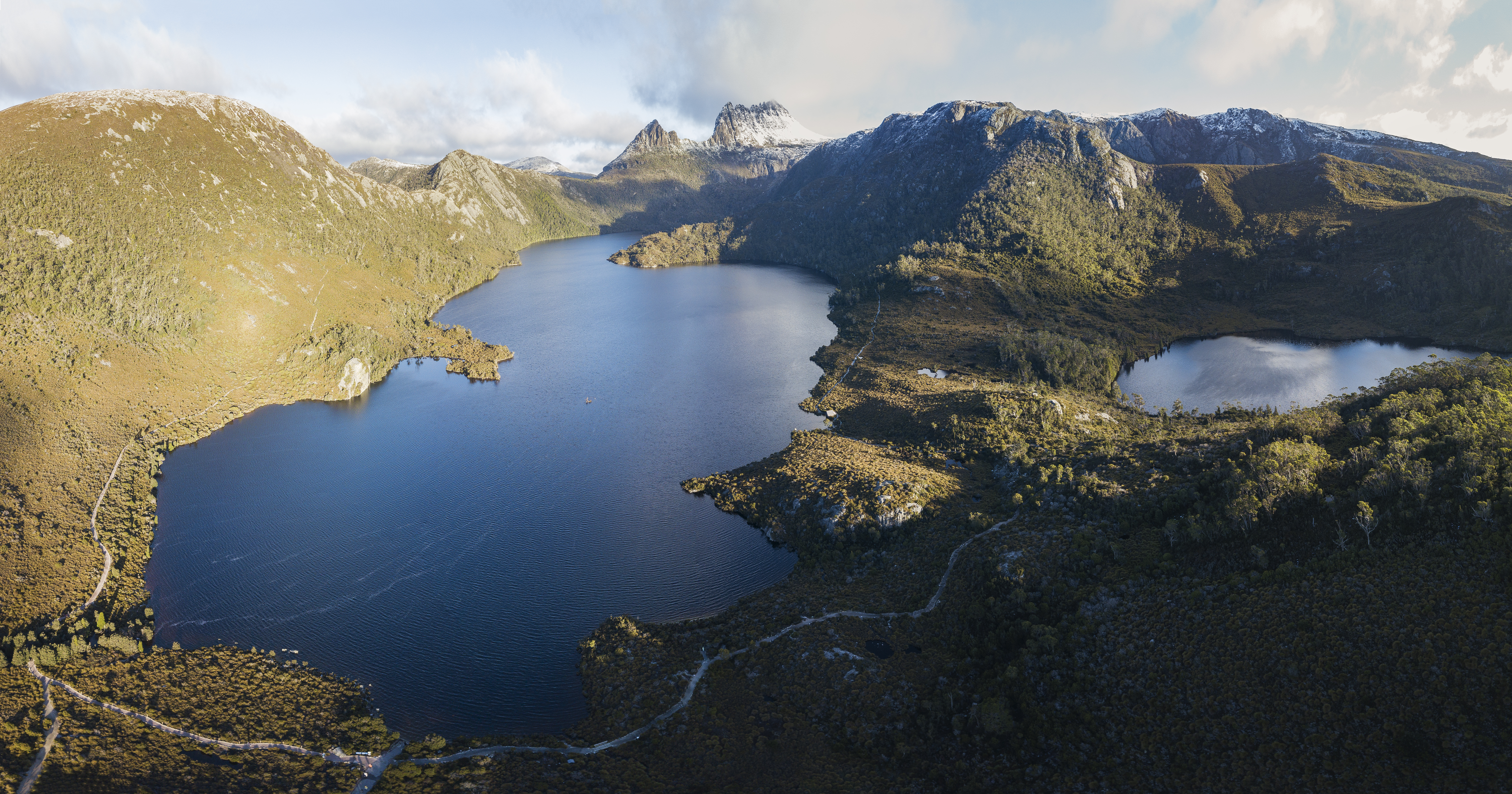
Dove Lake and Cradle Mountain, Cradle Mountain-Lake St Clair National Park

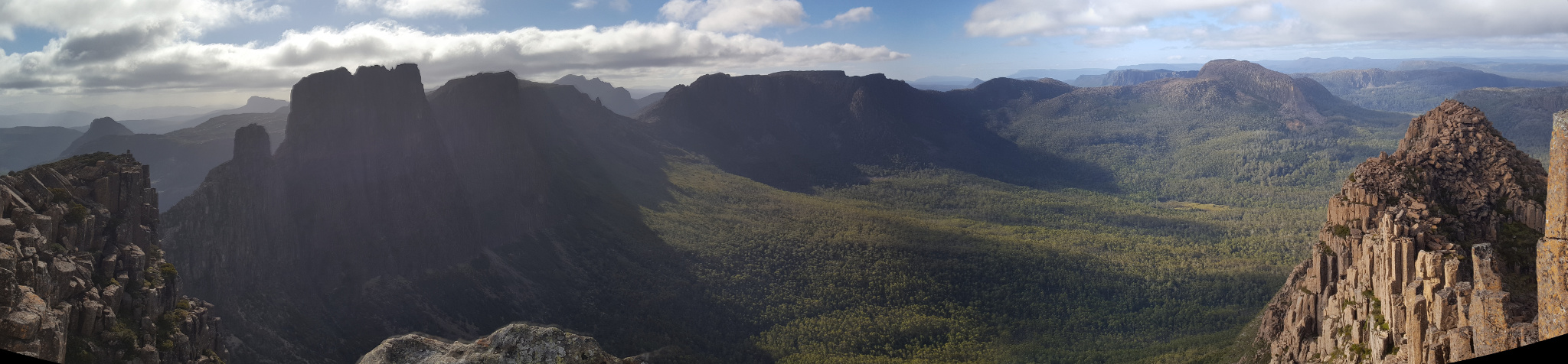
View from The Acropolis, Cradle Mountain-Lake St Clair

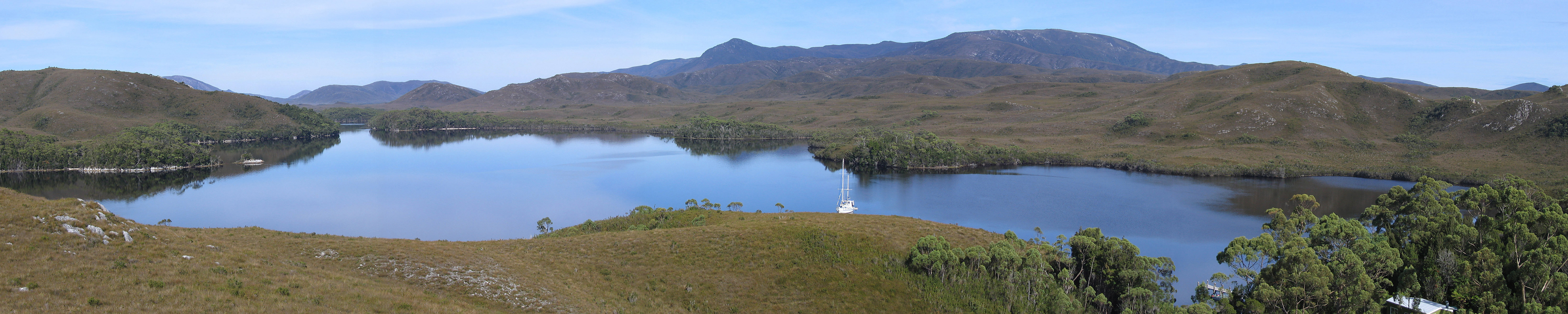
Part of Bathurst Harbour, Southwest National Park

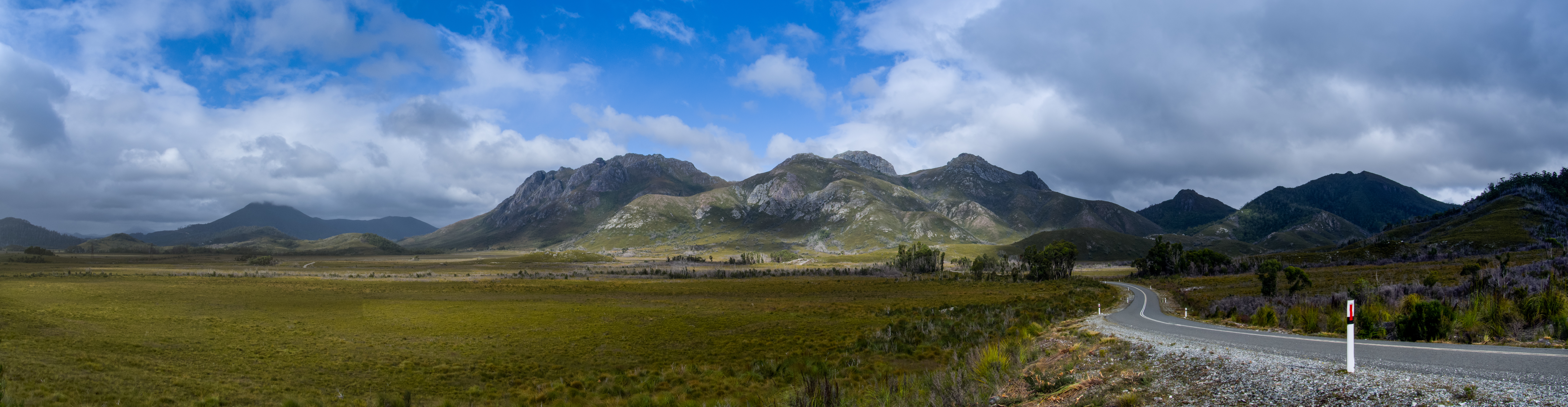
The Sentinels, Southwest

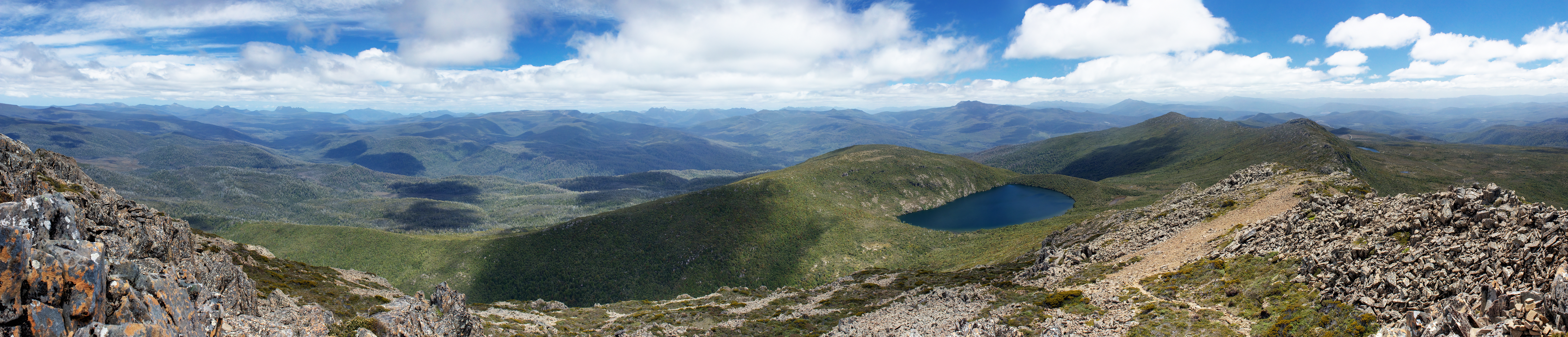
View from Hartz Mountain, Harz National Park

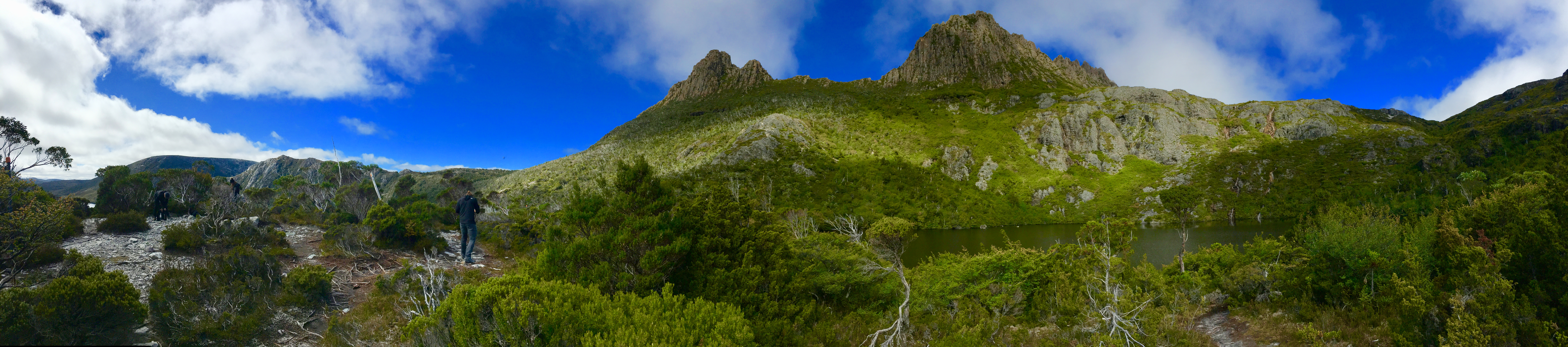
Cradle Mountain, Cradle Mountain-Lake St Clair National Park

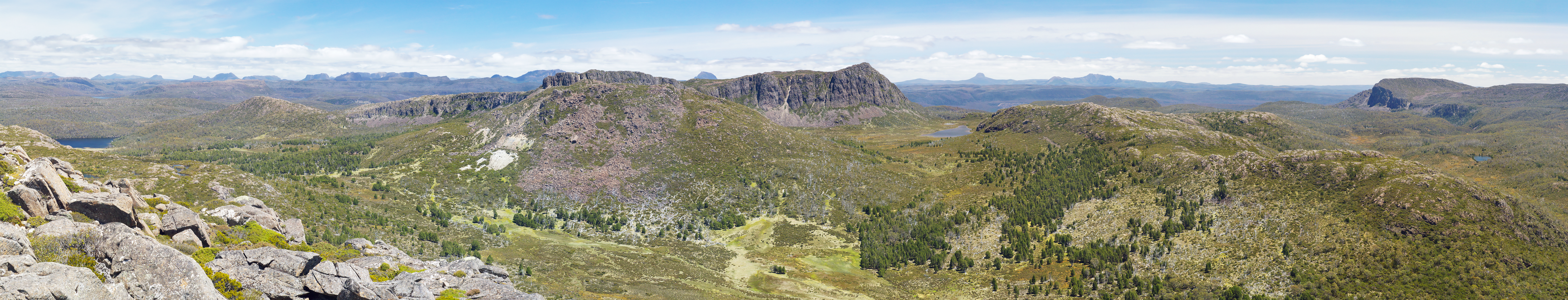
View from Mount Jerusalem, Walls of Jerusalem

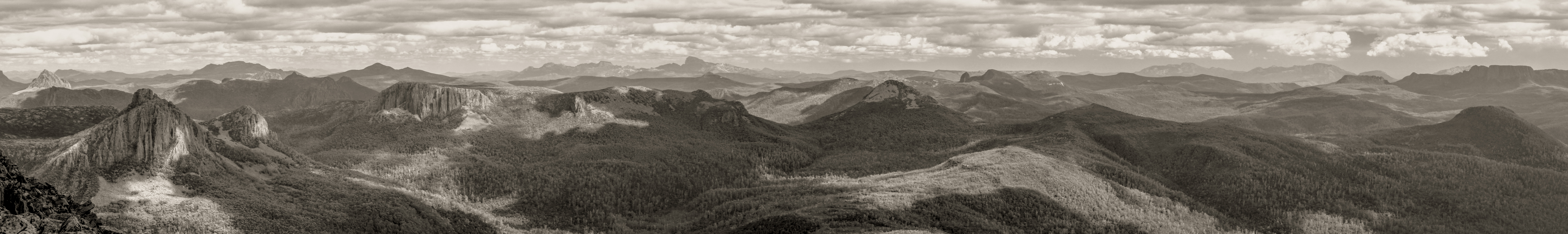
View from Mount Ossa, Cradle Mountain-Lake St Clair

== See also ==
- Protected areas of Tasmania
- Tasmanian Wilderness Society
- Savage River National Park
