= Port Davey =

Oceanic inlet of Tasmania, Australia

Port Davey (Poynduc)
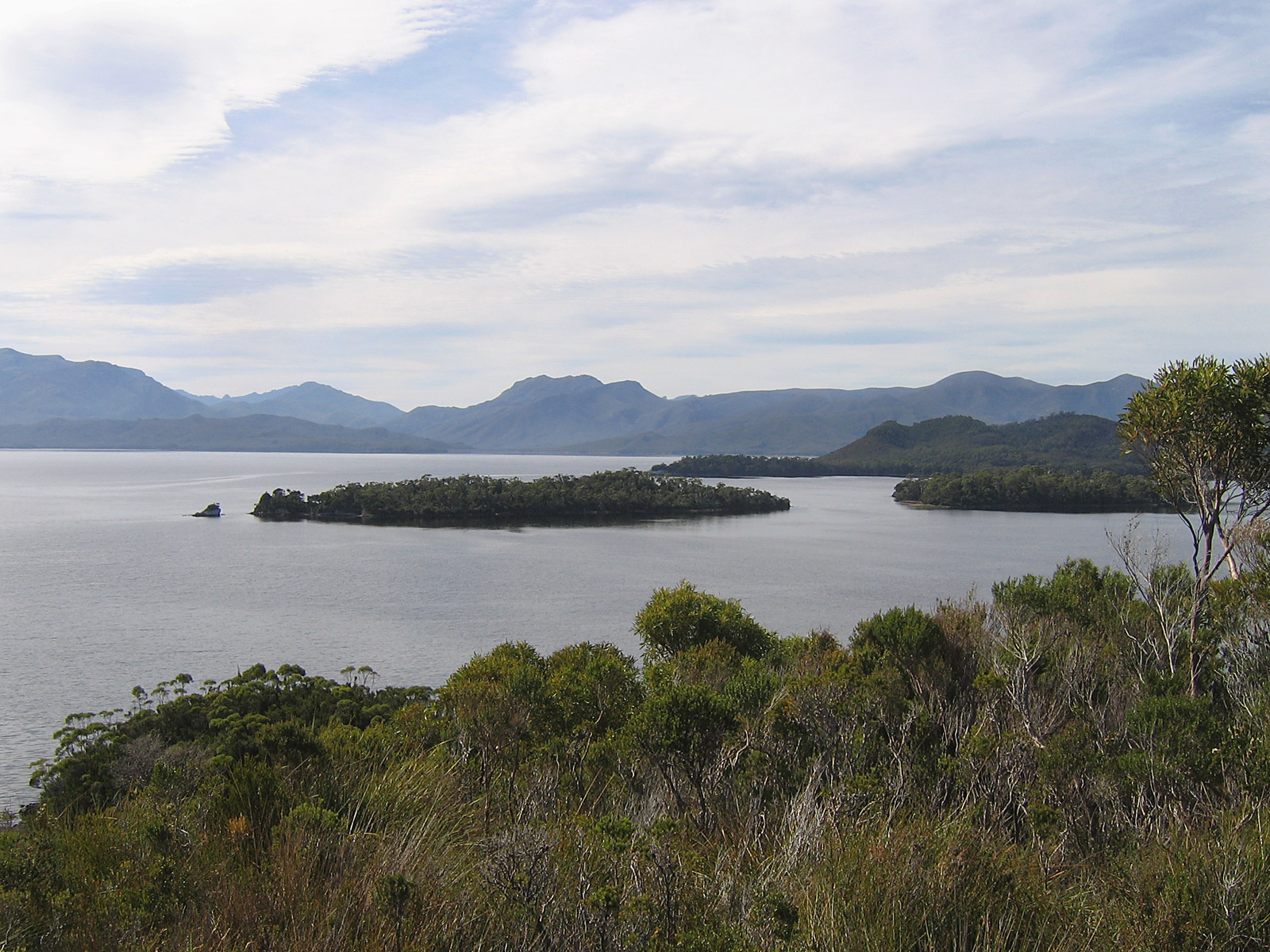
- Celery Top Islands

- Location on the south west coast of Tasmania
- Location: South Western Tasmania
- Coordinates: 43°19′48″S 145°54′36″E
- Etymology: Thomas Davey, a former Governor of Tasmania
- River sources: Davey River
- Ocean/sea sources: Southern Ocean
- Basin countries: Australia

Port Davey is an oceanic inlet located in the south west region of Tasmania, Australia.

Port Davey was named by explorer James Kelly in honour of Thomas Davey, a former Governor of Tasmania. Port Davey is contained within the Port Davey/Bathurst Harbour Marine Nature Reserve, the Melaleuca to Birchs Inlet Important Bird Area and the Southwest National Park, part of the Tasmanian Wilderness World Heritage Area. The Toogee name of the port is Poynduc.

With the support of the then Premier of Tasmania, Robert Cosgrove (in office from 1939), Australian journalist Critchley Parker proposed a Jewish settlement at Port Davey in 1941.

== History ==
=== Indigenous inhabitants ===
Aboriginal Tasmanians inhabited the Port Davey and surrounding areas for thousands of years before the onset of British invasion. In the early 1800s, the Ninene clan of the Toogee people resided in the Port Davey region. In 1830, many of these people died from diseases introduced by the British. All the surviving Ninene were then rounded-up in the following few years through the colonial government's policy of forcibly exiling the remaining Aboriginal Tasmanians to Flinders Island. There has been no permanent inhabitation of the Port Davey by humans since this removal of the Ninene.

=== European exploration ===
The French navigator Marion du Fresne was the first European to record the inlet now called Port Davey, in March 1772. On 13 December 1798, when Flinders was off the West Coast, he mentioned Marion's small chart of the area, and tried to take the Norfolk in closer to investigate the opening marked on Marion's chart. That opening was clearly marked on Flinders' first map of "Van Diemen's Land" Published in 1800. James Kelly has always been seen as the first European to enter Port Davey; however, Kelly would have seen Flinders' maps and may have had them with him.

The expeditions led George Augustus Robinson in the early 1830s to make contact and then forcibly remove the Aboriginal Tasmanians living in the region were the first overland explorations of the Port Davey region by Europeans.

Later in the 1800s, a small piners (Huon pine lumberjacks) settlement and boatyard was located on Payne Bay on Port Davey's north. The settlement remained until the 1900s when the Huon pine trade ceased. Another temporary settlement was located at Bramble Cove behind the Breaksea Islands to serve the whaling industry in the early 1800s. Whaling ships would enter Port Davey for wood, water and vegetables and to try-out captured whales in sheltered waters. There is also evidence shore-based whaling took place at Bramble Cove in the middle of the 19th century. Nothing remains of the site except for a few Huon pine headstones from an old cemetery.

The Bathurst Harbour/Port Davey area was marked on early 1800s maps as being the site for a settlement named Bathurst. The exact location of the proposed settlement varied depending on the map. Locations included Bramble Cove, Joe Page Bay below Mount Mackenzie and the Rowitta Plains. By the Victorian era, cartographers discontinued marking the settlement along with others such as Montgomery south of the Spero River, Cracroft on the Arthur Plains and Huntley in the Upper Florentine Forests west of Mount Field National Park.

The pioneer aviator Francis McClean organized and led an expedition to Port Davey to observe the May 9, 1910 solar eclipse. They suffered almost continual rain, yet a bush fire came within 1.2 metres (4 ft) of destroying their instruments and built a concrete platform for their instruments on Hixson's point. However the weather obscured the eclipse on 9 May.

Catalina PBY 5 flying boat, serial number 292, VH-BDP was the first recorded civilian aircraft to land in Port Davey on 8 July 1947, flown by John Fraser (ex RAAF pilot). It was one of 3 bought as war surplus from RAAF by J Botterill & Fraser, South Melbourne, Vic, intended to be used to carry freshly caught seafood from fishing boats in Port Davey to Adelaide, Melbourne and Sydney. Only VH-BDP commenced operations, but ceased in early 1948 and the aircraft were sold in May 1948.

Fishing boats Pacific Pride and Diane utilised Port Davey to catch seafood for sale in Hobart in 1947.

=== Jewish state proposal ===
In the late 1930s, the British Zionist League considered a number of other places where a Jewish homeland could be established. The Kimberley region (Kimberley Plan) in Australia was considered until the Curtin government (in office: 1941–1945) rejected the possibility as the Japanese threat to Darwin intensified.

In 1941, Australian journalist Critchley Parker surveyed the remote areas of southwest Tasmanian wilderness in search of a land that could eventually become a new home for Jewish refugees fleeing Nazi Europe. Although Critchley was not Jewish, he took the Jewish cause fervently. Some historians claim that his passion came from his love for a Jewish Australian journalist for The Age named Caroline Isaacson. Furthermore, even Tasmania's then premier Robert Cosgrove was open to the sentiment, after touring Port Davey in 1941, where he stated, "My Government accepts in principle the proposal that a settlement of Jewish migrants should be established in Tasmania".

Critchley and Isaac Steinberg, a Jewish Russian politician, planned a trip to Port Davey, before Critchley fell ill on the plane and the trip was cancelled. In early 1942, Critchley returned alone in an effort to study the area again. Critchley became positive that Tasmania was the best option for a Jewish settlement, in addition to writing many notes about it, describing the potential of industry and trade, and how it will become the "Paris of Australasia". But his death in 1942 put an end to the idea of a Jewish state in Tasmania.

According to Dr Hilary L. Rubinstein, a Jewish Australian writer, Parker "had all sorts of things in mind...gold, iron, tin, coal as well, and after those minerals had been exploited and revenue built up, the Jewish settlement could then go on to other industries...The next thing after mining would be fish canning and processing eels, crayfish, and extending even into whaling from Antarctic...Then they would go into whisky, textiles and carpet weaving...He also thought that the fashion industry could be built up with the help of French Jews."

== Geography ==
Common dolphins (Delphinus delphis) swimming in front of a displacement hull vessel in Port Davey.

Port Davey lies between the Southern Ocean and Bathurst Harbour, which is linked by the Bathurst Channel. The inlet leads north into Payne Bay, fed by the Davey River, with Payne Bay being defined by the features of Davey Head to the west, and Mount Berry to the east. The eastern aspect from Joe Page Bay to Bathurst Harbour is sheltered from the Roaring Forties that buffet the south and west coasts of Tasmania by a narrow part of the inlet that effectively makes the land to the south a peninsula.

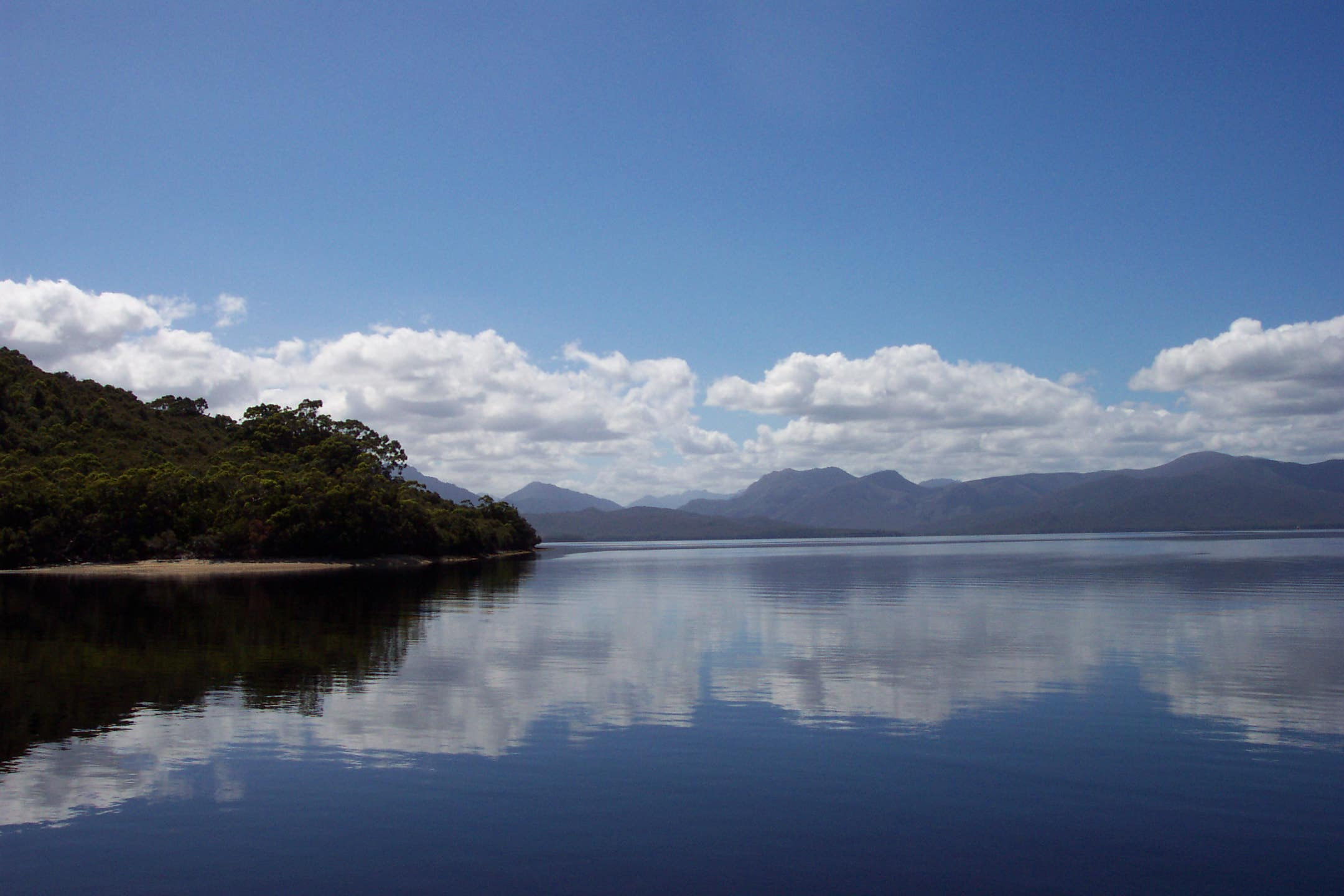
Bathurst Harbour, looking East

The north–south ranges on the peninsula's South West Cape Range and Melaleuca Range lie to the west of the Southwest Conservation Area which is a section of land excluded from the Southwest National Park that exists between Melaleuca Inlet on the south side of Bathurst Harbour and Cox Bight on the south coast.

It is the penultimate waypoint on the western part of the South Coast Walking Track that is also known as South Coast and Port Davey Tracks.

Port Davey is not populated, but for many years Deny King and family resided at Melaleuca, engaged in alluvial tin mining. Since the death of Deny King in 1991, the family retain a leasehold within the national park and is actively involved in conservation programs but is not permanently resident.

== Climate ==
Port Davey has a cool oceanic climate with mild summers and chilly winters, with moderate to high rainfall spread throughout the year.

Climate data for Melaleuca, Port Davey (6 m AMSL; BOM 1948-1969)
| Month | Jan | Feb | Mar | Apr | May | Jun | Jul | Aug | Sep | Oct | Nov | Dec | Year |
|---|---|---|---|---|---|---|---|---|---|---|---|---|---|
| Mean daily maximum °C (°F) | 19.2 (66.6) | 19.0 (66.2) | 17.8 (64.0) | 15.5 (59.9) | 13.1 (55.6) | 11.8 (53.2) | 11.7 (53.1) | 12.0 (53.6) | 13.9 (57.0) | 15.2 (59.4) | 16.3 (61.3) | 19.2 (66.6) | 15.4 (59.7) |
| Mean daily minimum °C (°F) | 9.6 (49.3) | 9.5 (49.1) | 8.7 (47.7) | 7.7 (45.9) | 6.1 (43.0) | 3.9 (39.0) | 3.9 (39.0) | 4.6 (40.3) | 5.7 (42.3) | 6.2 (43.2) | 7.3 (45.1) | 8.6 (47.5) | 6.8 (44.2) |
Source: Commonwealth of Australia, Bureau of Meteorology

Climate data for Melaleuca, Port Davey (6 m AMSL; BOM 1946-2011)
| Month | Jan | Feb | Mar | Apr | May | Jun | Jul | Aug | Sep | Oct | Nov | Dec | Year |
|---|---|---|---|---|---|---|---|---|---|---|---|---|---|
| Average rainfall mm (inches) | 135.2 (5.32) | 114.6 (4.51) | 151.5 (5.96) | 207.7 (8.18) | 234.2 (9.22) | 217.5 (8.56) | 238.8 (9.40) | 235.7 (9.28) | 200.2 (7.88) | 194.6 (7.66) | 154.9 (6.10) | 162.3 (6.39) | 2,142.5 (84.35) |
| Average rainy days (≥ 0.2 mm) | 17.1 | 14.1 | 17.3 | 20.4 | 21.9 | 20.4 | 22.2 | 23.0 | 21.4 | 22.2 | 19.6 | 18.2 | 237.8 |
Source: Commonwealth of Australia, Bureau of Meteorology

Solar exposure climate data for Melaleuca, Port Davey 1990–2023
| Month | Jan | Feb | Mar | Apr | May | Jun | Jul | Aug | Sep | Oct | Nov | Dec | Year |
|---|---|---|---|---|---|---|---|---|---|---|---|---|---|
| Mean daily solar exposure (MJ/m^{2}) | 21.3 | 17.7 | 11.5 | 7.5 | 4.6 | 3.8 | 4.6 | 6.9 | 10.5 | 15.0 | 18.6 | 20.8 | 11.9 |
Source: Commonwealth of Australia, Bureau of Meteorology

== See also ==
- Macquarie Harbour
- Proposals for a Jewish state
