= Southwest National Park =

National park in Tasmania, Australia

- IUCN category II (national park)
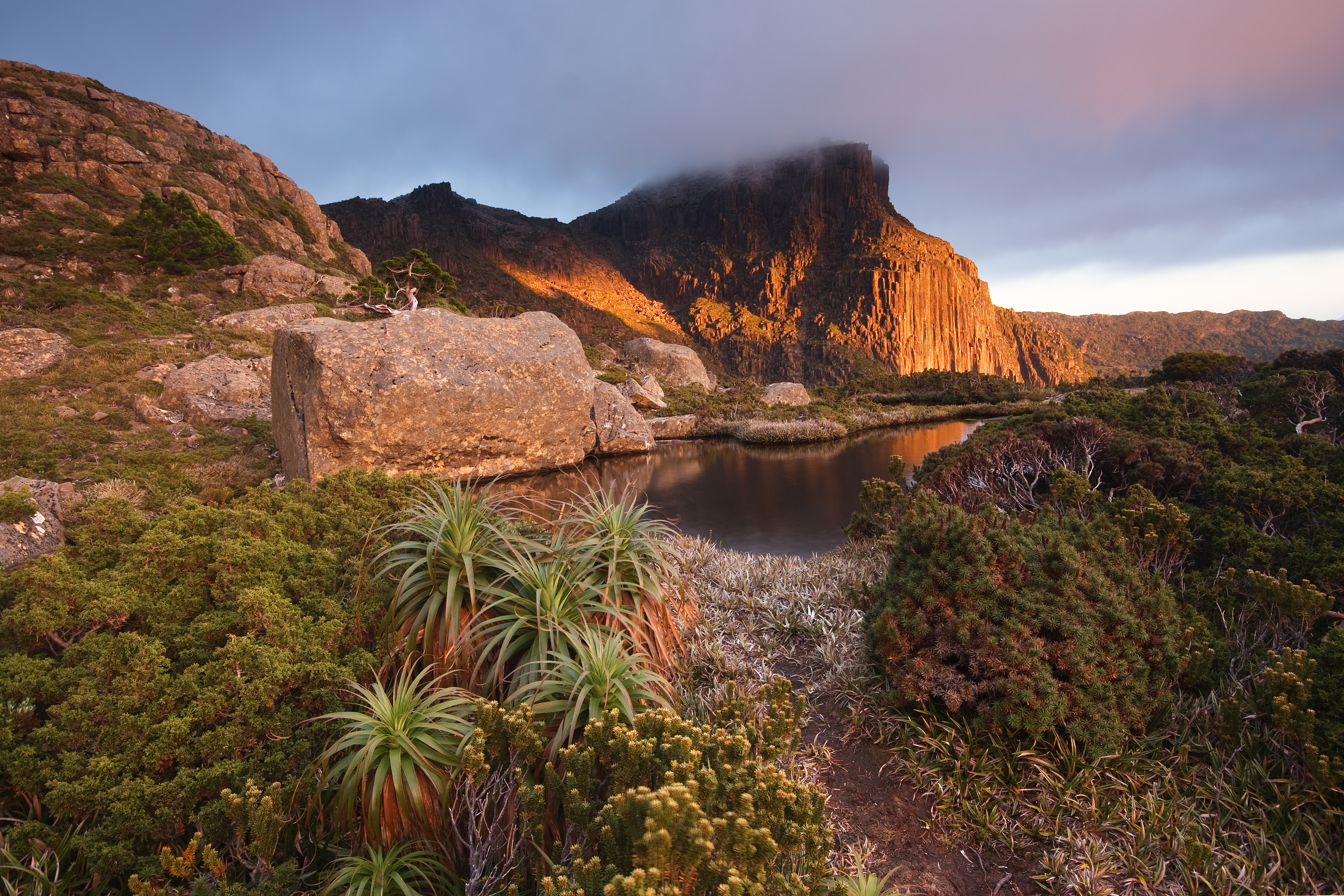
- Mt Anne from High Shelf Camp, Southwest National Park

- Location within Tasmania
- Interactive map of Southwest National Park
- Location: Tasmania
- Nearest city: Strathgordon
- Coordinates: 42°50′01″S 146°08′58″E
- Area: 6,182.67 km^{2} (2,387.14 sq mi)
- Established: 1968
- Governing body: Tasmania Parks and Wildlife Service
- Website: Official website

UNESCO World Heritage Site
- Criteria: Cultural: iii, iv, vi, vii; natural: viii, ix, x
- Reference: 181
- Inscription: 1982 (6th Session)

Southwest National Park is an Australian national park located in the south-west of Tasmania, bounded by the Franklin-Gordon Wild Rivers National Park to the north and the Hartz Mountains National Park to the east. It is a part of a chain of national parks and state reserves that make up the Tasmanian Wilderness World Heritage Area. Covering an area of 6,183 km^{2} (2,387 sq mi), it is Tasmania's largest national park.

The park is well known for its pristine wilderness, remoteness and unpredictable severe weather. The area is largely unaffected by humans. Although evidence shows Aboriginal Tasmanians have visited the area for at least 25,000 years, and European settlers have made occasional forays into the park area since the 19th century, there has been very little permanent habitation and only minimal impact on the natural environment. Within the area there is only one road, to the hydroelectricity township of Strathgordon. The southern and western reaches of the park are far removed from any vehicular access. The only access is by foot, boat, or light aircraft.

The tiny locality of Melaleuca in the extreme south-west provides an airstrip and some very basic facilities, mainly managed by the Parks and Wildlife Service.

== History ==
=== South West Tasmanian Aboriginal Nation and Black War ===
South West Tasmania has been inhabited for approximately 40,000 years, and isolated from mainland Australia since the Bassian Plain flooded 8,000 years ago.

Tools, bones and fireplaces found in caves in what is now the Franklin-Gordon Wild Rivers National Park date aboriginal occupation in south-west Tasmania back to at least 34,000 BP. The South West nation was one of nine across the state, and contained four known clans the Mimegin, Lowreenne, Ninene and Needwonne. They were nomadic hunter gatherers, with staple foods including shellfish, crayfish, seals, penguins along the coast, and wallabies, wombats and birds along the buttongrass plains.

There is some evidence to suggest that repeated burning of buttongrass moorlands by the South West Nation has caused it to propagate more widely than is natural. This was done to increase areas where wallabies and wombats can forage for hunting purposes.

European sealers hunted in Tasmania from 1798, shortly followed by settlements around the Derwent River, to the east. Conflict between the aboriginals and Europeans soon followed, cumulating in the Black War and the near-destruction of Aboriginal Tasmanians.

=== Early European exploration ===
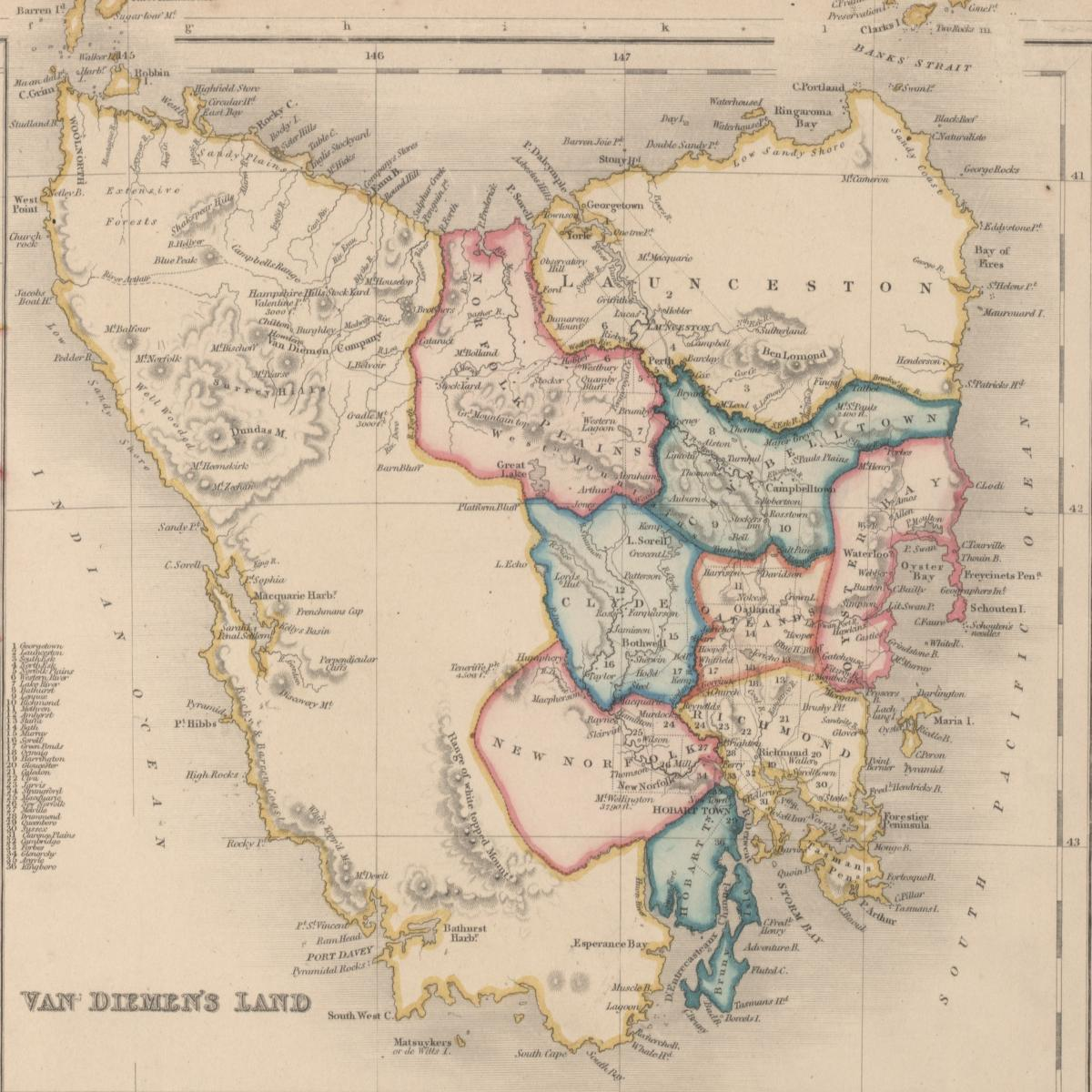
Van Diemen's Land 1852. South West Tasmania was one of the last areas to be explored.

The South West of Tasmania was first seen by Europeans in 1642 by Abel Tasman, but it was not known to be an island until Matthew Flinders and George Bass circumnavigated it 156 years later.

The first European overland expeditions into the region were conducted in the early 1830s by George Augustus Robinson, who was guided by Truganini, Woureddy and several other Indigenous people. Many landmarks in the region were named by him. During these expeditions, Robinson, acting under the policies of the local British colonial government, removed all the Indigenous residents from the area.

The far south west was first surveyed from land by James Sprent in 1854 when he reached Port Davey, becoming the first European to notice Federation Peak which he dubbed "the Obelisk". He later published this work as 'Map of Tasmania and Adjacent Islands'.

=== National Park Status ===
The core of the national park, an area of 239 km^{2} (92 sq mi) surrounding Lake Pedder was first created in 1955, and called the Lake Pedder National Park. It was a glacial outwash lake, which hosted numerous endemic species including the Lake Pedder earthworm and Pedder galaxias. Lake Pedder was famous among bushwalkers for its majesty and unique pink quartz sand. Dr Peter Hay reflected, "Had it still existed, it would have the same sort of status in Australian mythology as other landscape icons like Uluru and Kakadu and the Great Barrier Reef."

In 1968 the Tasmanian Government expanded the area to 1,916 km^{2} (740 sq mi), renaming it the Southwest National Park. However, it was actually as scenic reserve, with protections removed so that the area could form a catchment of the Tasmanian Hydro Electric Commissions (HEC) Upper Gordon River hydro-electric generation scheme. The aim was to increase Tasmania's capacity to generate hydro-electricity, and attract secondary industry with the incentive of cheap renewable energy. The original Lake Pedder was controversially flooded in 1972, with the issue attracting attention of environmentalist groups around the state as they unsuccessfully opposed the dam. They later reformed, and successfully halted the Franklin River Dam, the first success of the greens movement in Australia.

In 1976 the national park was extended towards southwest and incorporated most of the Port Davey State Reserve, and continued to expand until it reached its present size in 2000.

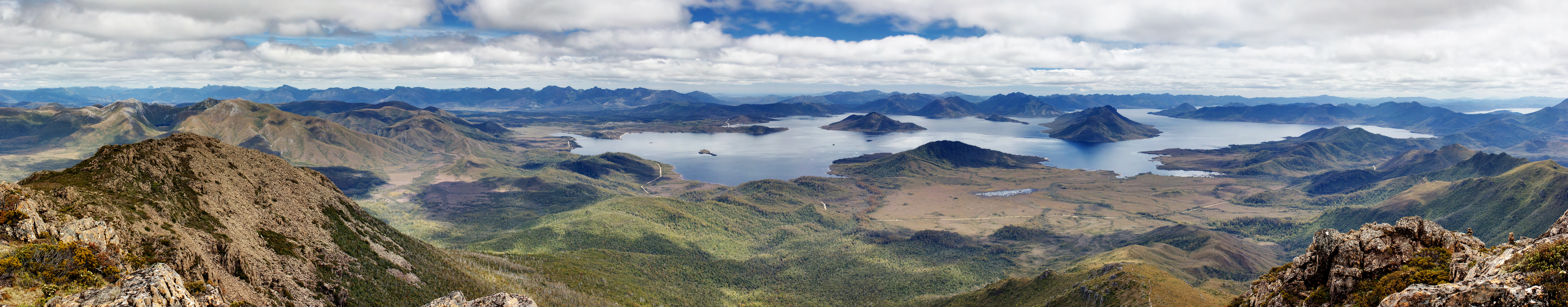
The new Lake Pedder from Mount Eliza, Southwest National Park, Australia

The Southwest National Park was a biosphere reserve under the United Nations Biosphere Program from 1977 until its withdrawal from the program in 2002. Its designation as a biosphere reserve was due to the important world heritage values and human use values it contained. Some of these values included being a key breeding zone for the critically endangered Orange-bellied parrot, remnants of Aboriginal occupation and other historic heritage sites such as the Melaleuca – Port Davey Area Plan (Tasmania Parks and Wildlife 2003, p 2). This was followed by a World Heritage listing in 1982 which was then expanded to its current size.

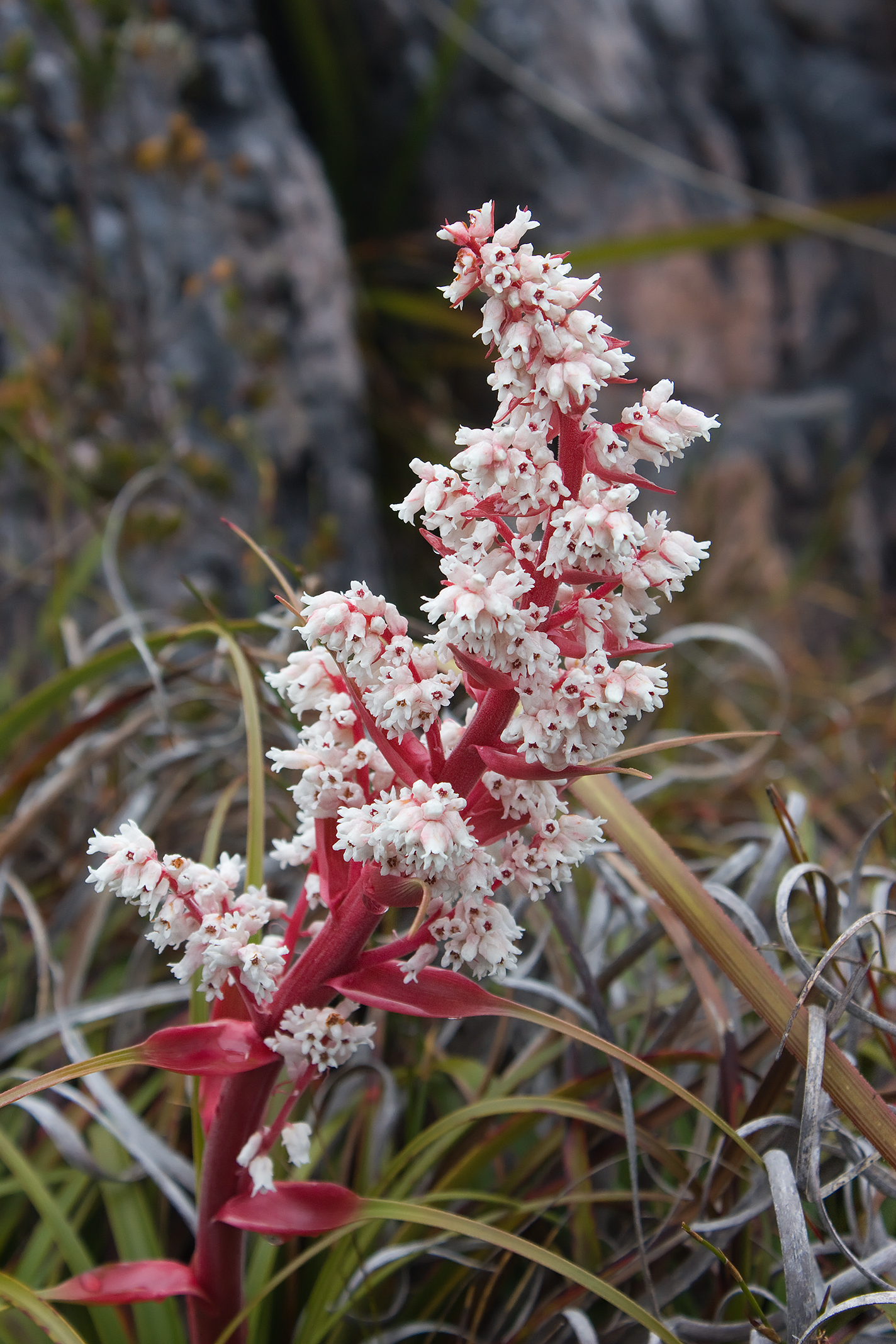
Dracophyllum milliganii

== Climate ==
The climate of the Southwest National Park is renowned for its adverse, often inhospitable conditions across all seasons of the year. As noted by the Melaleuca- Port Davey Area Plan the climate is characterised by high annual rainfall of over 2000mm (as per the Bureau of Meteorology Port Davey station records from 1946 to 2000), often very strong to cyclonic westerly or south-westerly winds, low temperatures, frosts and high incidence of cloud cover.

== Flora ==
Although the climatic conditions of South-West National Park have been considered as rather inhospitable, or too unpredictable or capricious for humans to inhabit, as indicated by only the relatively small township on Strathgordon near the northern boundary of the park, it paradoxically is a major centre of biodiversity, with a number of species endemic to the park itself. This is not so more evident than with the flora that inhabits the national park.

In a rugged landscape dominated by buttongrass moorland, wet Eucalypt forest, coastal and scrub vegetation, the national park is home to 375 species of vascular flora from 84 families which represents up to 20 percent of Tasmania's flora. Of these, as noted by Tasmania Parks and Wildlife Service (2003, p 19), approximately 118 are endemic to Tasmania alone, with six of them listed as rare or endangered. This includes the King's lomatia (Lomatia tasmanica) which has been listed as endangered while others such as the blown grass (Agrostis aequata), Spring peppercress (Lepidium flexicaule) and dune buttercup (Ranunculus acaulis) are rare.

The park is also home to several vascular species of plant that are endemic and/or endangered, yet even with the research undertaken, very little is known about the non-vascular or bryophyte species such as mosses, hornworts etcetera. To date up to 128 species have been recorded which again represents 20 percent of the total bryophyte population in Tasmania. Of these six are endemic to the national park, and as noted by Parks and Wildlife Tasmania, eight have also been listed for conservation assessment (that is, whether they are vulnerable, endangered etcetera).

With such a significant number of vascular and non-vascular plant species and communities inhabiting the park, the main concerns to the vegetation within the park, based on carbon content in soils, written records and both current and past pollen spectra records, appears to be fire, which the area has been shown to have a significant record of, and more recently, the threat caused by the root rot fungus Phytophthora cinnamomi, particularly to the Buttongrass moorlands. To assist in protecting the national park from such threats, the Parks and Wildlife Service of Tasmania, in conjunction with the Department of Primary Industries, Parks, Water and Environment, developed the Melaleuca – Port Davey Area Plan and Strategic Regional Plan for Phytophthora cinnamomi to ensure that inter alia regular monitoring and regular hygiene checks of visitors occurred. The hygiene checks were designed to prevent root rot from becoming a significant threat to these flora species and or communities of the park.

== Wildlife ==
In an area that is rich in terms of ecological flora communities, the Southwest National Park is also a wilderness area that is uniquely rich in biodiversity in terms of the variety of fauna species that either have all of their Tasmanian population or a majority of their population inhabiting the park. Within this national park alone there are, as noted by Driessen and Mallick 2003, three species of terrestrial mammals, 10 terrestrial bird species, seven reptile species, three frog species, four freshwater fish and or marine fish that are endemic to this 600-thousand-hectare national park.

However, more pertinently the park is an important habitat to several species, including the orange-bellied parrot (Neophema Chrysogaster) and freshwater fish Pedder galaxias (Galaxias pedderensis), that are listed as critically endangered and extinct in the wild respectively under both Australian Commonwealth and Tasmanian legislation.

=== Birds ===
Of the threatened, endangered and the eight species that are simply endemic to the park, such as the fairy tern, wedge-tail eagle, green rosella and dusky robin respectively, the species that adds to the park's cultural and conservation uniqueness is the Neophema Chrysogaster, or more simply the Orange-bellied Parrot.

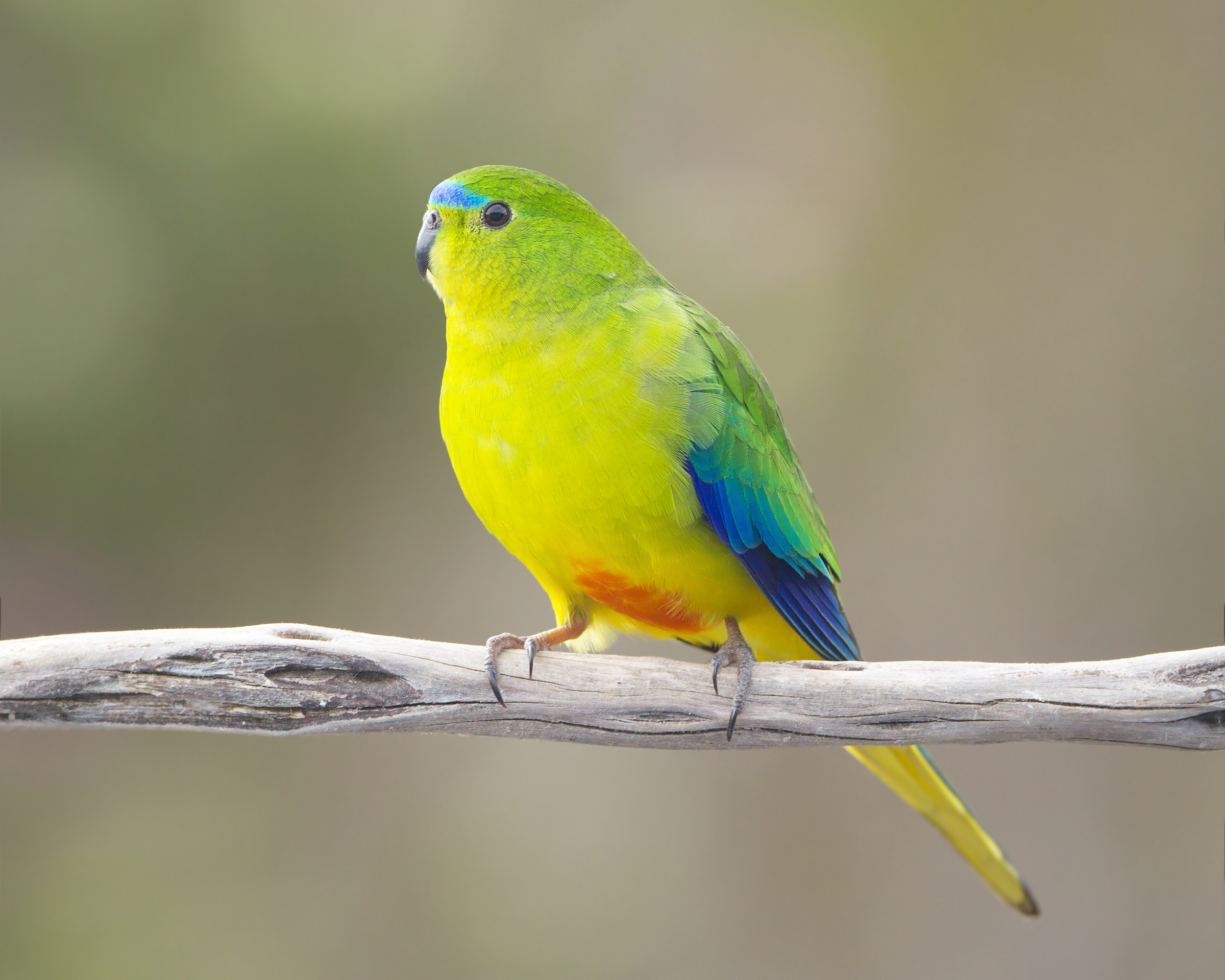
Orange-bellied parrot, Melaleuca Lagoon

As noted under the Commonwealth's National Recovery Plan 2016 listed as Critically Endangered under Commonwealth Environment Protection and Biodiversity Conservation Act 1999, Endangered under New South Wales Threatened Species Conservation Act 1995, South Australia's National Parks and Wildlife Act 1972, Tasmania's Threatened Species Protection Act 1995 and Threatened under Victoria's Flora and Fauna Guarantee Act 1988. At an international level the species has also been listed as Critically Endangered under International Union for Conservation of Nature and Natural Resources Red List (IUCN).

What makes the area unique is that this National Park, or more specifically within 10 kilometres of Melaleuca Lagoon, remains the only known significant breeding ground of this parrot. This occurs primarily between November and March with the birds migrating back to the coast of South-East Australia over winter following a route along the west coast of Tasmania and King Island. This breeding ground remains significant as there are currently only 50 Orange-bellied Parrots remaining in the wild with another 320 in captivity.

Additionally, although the numbers in captivity appear to suggest the program is working, despite efforts made in undertaking the captive breeding program, the breeding success, in particular, the egg fertility and genetic diversity, as noted in the National Recovery Plan, is lower in the captive population than the wild population. As such it has been seen as critically imperative to ensure that the remaining numbers in the wild and quality habitat is retained, particularly in regards to the breeding program. Fortunately, through regular monitoring, supplementary feeding, artificial nest boxes and protection of their nesting and foraging habitat in the park, this appears to be occurring despite the existing potential threats posed by fire, climate change and damage to habitat.

=== Mammals ===
With the number of mammal species that inhabit the park, the only one that appears threatened is the New Zealand fur seal, which as noted by the Melaleuca-Port Davey Plan, only regularly visits the offshore Maatsuyker Island during the breeding season.

=== Fish ===
Another unique aspect to this park is the freshwater community, particularly the fish. As noted by Tasmania Parks and Wildlife, the aquatic system in the park has had no introduced fish species recorded, which gives it high conservation value as there are few systems in Australia where this has occurred.

Although fish are relatively well studied within the park, that is, 37 percent of species have been discovered once, the numbers and research undertaken suggests that there is potentially a relatively large number of undescribed or undiscovered fish species that are endemic to the park. With such potential for discovery of new species, that alone would indicate that it remains a significant area for increased biodiversity amongst the marine life and warrants conservation.

However, of those fish species discovered such as the cusk-eel (Microbrotula sp.) and maugean skate (Zearaja maugeana) which are endemic to the park, there is one species of fish, known as the freshwater fish Pedder galaxias (Galaxias pedderensis) that has been listed both at a Tasmanian and Commonwealth level as endangered in 1995 and extinct in the wild in 2009 respectively. Once endemic to Lake Pedder within the national park, the Pedder galaxias is unfortunately no longer found within the park with the population only found at two translocations which were part of conservation management program undertaken in the 1980s to protect the species. Alongside the now extinct Thylacine in Tasmania, this case is indicative of ensuring that conservation measures are taken to protect species that are endemic to a particular area and have high conservation value, such as the Southwest National Park.

=== Reptiles and amphibians ===
Alongside a number of bird and mammal species, there are several reptile and frog species that are uniquely endemic to the park alone. These include three reptiles, the Tasmanian tree skink, ocellated skink and she-oak skink, and amongst the frogs, the Tasmanian tree frog, Tasmanian froglet and recently discovered moss froglet.

== Environmental problems and threats ==
Even with such unique biodiversity amongst both the flora and fauna, there still exists environmental problems that threatened the conservation of that biodiversity within the park.

Of primary concern, like many conservation areas, is climate change. Changing temperature and rainfall patterns has caused drought, an increase in dry lightning induced fires, decreased vegetation growth and subsequent food supply for endangered species such as the Orange-bellied Parrot. Consequently, as a result of a decrease in food supply, particularly amongst the Buttongrass moorlands, the volunteers under the state program provide supplementary feeds for the endangered Orange-bellied Parrots.

The other major environmental threat is the root rot fungus Phytophthora cinnamomi, which has been found at Scotts Peak and Melaleuca. This disease particularly threatens the Buttongrass moorlands that cover a significant part of the park and provide both habitat and feeding grounds for a number of endemic species including birds and amphibians. To assist in preventing the spread of this disease, the Tasmanian Department of Primary Industries, Parks, Water and Environment are working closely with Tasmanian Parks and Wildlife to ensure that no soil with the disease enters the park. This involves measures such as hygiene checks of people's boots and clothing, and planes and boats that enter the park. This is done at established stations along the Port Davey Track and the South Coast Track.

== Human impacts ==
In addition to the environmental threats posed by climate change and root rot fungus, there are several other impacts, posed mainly by humans, that threatened the park. Of most concern from humans are the impacts posed from fishing, tourism and introduced pests such as feral cats and starlings into in the park.

=== Fishing ===
Due to the uniqueness of the freshwater and estuarine systems within the park, and wanting to prevent the introduction of pests such as the brown trout, fishing has been banned from the known estuarine and freshwater systems of the park such as Bathurst Harbour, Port Davey and Melaleuca.

=== Eco-tourism ===
To coincide with the threat of fire posed by increased lightning strikes from storms through climate change, the park has alongside all other national parks in Tasmania, introduced through the World Heritage Wilderness Plan 1999 the banning of camp fires and declaring the parks Fuel Stove Only Areas, to minimise the impact caused through walkers using the tracks and other eco-tourist ventures that utilise the park, particularly during the warmer months of October through to March.

=== Introduced species ===
Alongside the threat posed by humans through fishing, walking and other eco-tourist ventures, particularly in terms of threats from fire and litter, these ventures also posed a threat in terms of introduced species or pests such as feral cats, brown trout, and starlings into the park which threaten particularly the herbivore mammals, birds, fish and reptiles that are endemic to the park.

Tasmania Parks and Wildlife Services have attempted to address this threat through the Tasmania World Heritage Wilderness Plan, the Strategic Regional Plan for the root rot fungus and Port-Davey and Melaleuca Area Plan. The management strategies that have been enforced include inter alia, development and enforcement of a weed management plan, undertake regular checks of boats and aircraft entering the park, cleaning stations located at several spots along the walking tracks of Port Davey and South Coast and regular inspections and reviews of the houses and walker's huts within the park.

It is with these strategies that will hopefully ensure that the unique biodiversity of this World Heritage National Park is maintained.

== Access and recreation ==
There are two ways to access the park by land: the Gordon River Road to the hydroelectricity township of Strathgordon and the Cockle Creek route via the Huon Highway. The southern and western reaches of the park are far removed from any vehicular access. The only access is by foot, boat, or light aircraft. Two main walking tracks cross the park: the Port Davey Track, south from Lake Pedder and the South Coast Track, east from Cockle Creek, the other west from Cockle Creek along Tasmania's south-coast to Melaleuca. The walks are generally for more experienced walkers, taking approximately ten to fourteen days to complete the full route. Alternatively, a flight to or from Melaleuca may be arranged to split the walk, or for tourist access for day trips. Several more difficult walks also exist, encompassing the Eastern and Western Arthur Ranges, Precipitous Bluff, Mount Anne the South West Cape, and Federation Peak. Many of these latter routes are not recommended for inexperienced walkers, or for people traveling alone. Sea access to the region is best gained via Port Davey and Bathurst Harbour.

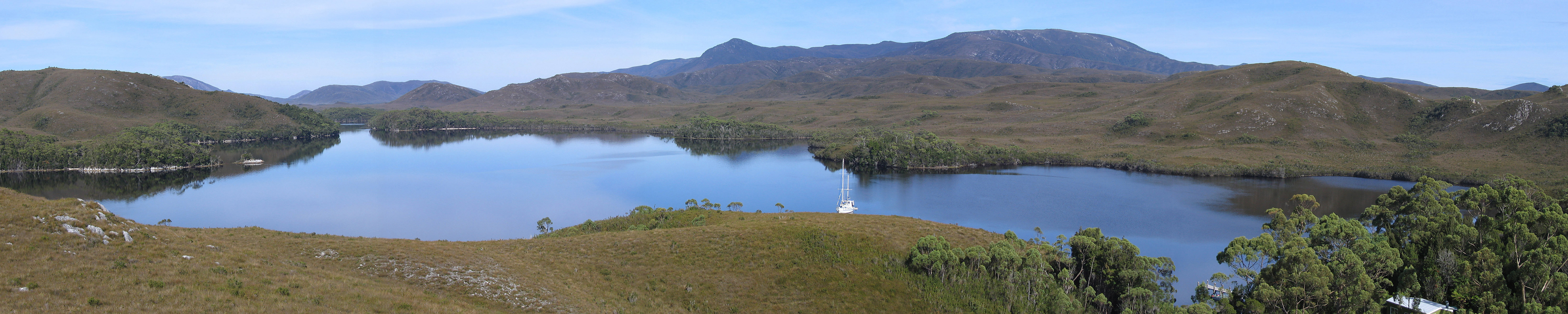
The spectacular and isolated Bathurst Harbour, South West Wilderness, Tasmania, Australia

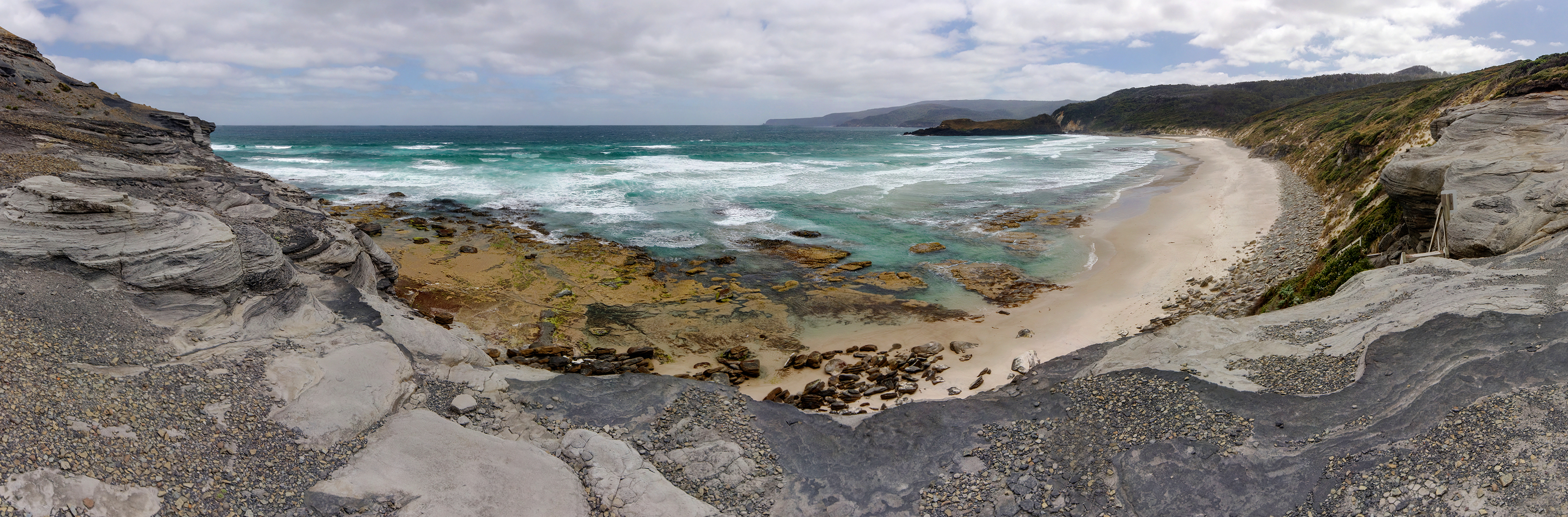
South Cape Bay, Southwest National Park, Tasmania

== See also ==
- Protected areas of Tasmania
- South West Wilderness
- South East Mutton Bird Islet
- Melaleuca
