= Bathurst Harbour, Tasmania =

Natural harbour on coast of South West Tasmania

Bathurst Harbour
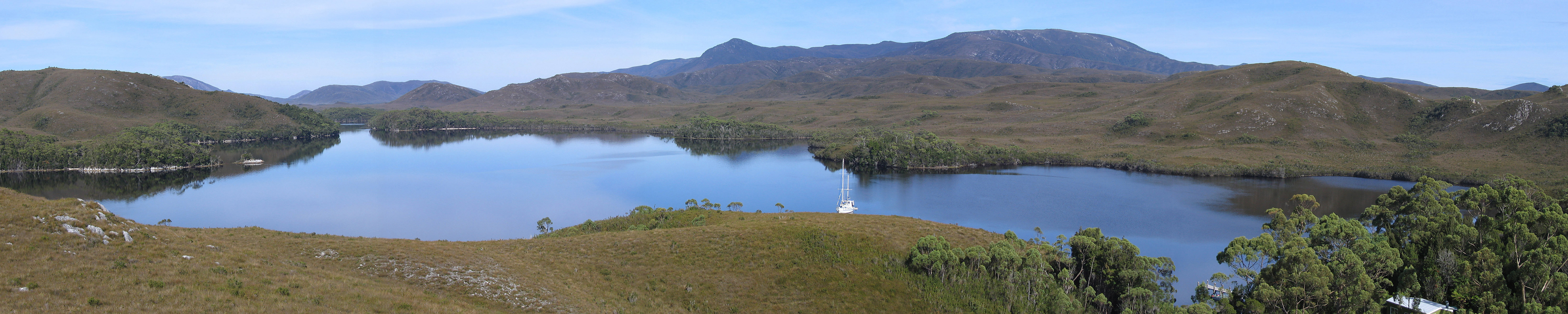
- Forest Lagoon, an offshoot of Bathurst Harbour, looking south with "Claytons Corner" in lower right

- Location in Tasmania
- Location: South West Tasmania
- Coordinates: 43°20′33.68″S 146°10′32.38″E
- River sources: North River, Old River, Ray River and Melaleuca Creek
- Primary outflows: Bathurst Channel to Port Davey and then the Southern Ocean
- Basin countries: Australia
- Average depth: 3 to 7 metres (9.8 to 23.0 ft)
- Max. depth: 29 metres (95 ft)
- Settlements: Melaleuca

Bathurst Harbour is a shallow bay located in the south west region of Tasmania, Australia. Bathurst Harbour is contained within the Port Davey/Bathurst Harbour Marine Nature Reserve, and the Southwest National Park, part of the Tasmanian Wilderness World Heritage Area.

The harbour is an expansive, almost landlocked, shallow bay of relatively uniform depth ranging from 3 to 7 metres (9.8 to 23.0 ft), which provides safe anchorage from the Roaring Forties that buffet the western and southern coasts of Tasmania. The harbour is connected by the narrow 12-kilometre (7.5 mi)-long Bathurst Channel to Port Davey, and then water flows into the Southern Ocean. Like most estuarine systems in southwest Tasmania, the water is stained a deep red-brown due to tannin leached from buttongrass and adjacent heathland.

== Features and location ==
Bathurst Harbour is a large, rectangular, almost landlocked body of water located in the southwest corner of Tasmania. The harbour is surrounded by low-lying alluvial plains with mountain ranges running along the western and eastern shores. The North River, Old River, Ray River and Melaleuca Creek all drain into the harbour either directly or into one of the many offshoot bays and inlets connected to the harbour.

Almost all of the harbour is navigable by sailing vessels with no submerged rocks or navigational hazards except for a small area around Black Swan Island at Old Bay in the harbours north. Of the four main inflows only Melaleuca Creek is truly navigable and maintains a depth in excess of 2–3 metres (6 ft 7 in – 9 ft 10 in) for more than 6.5 kilometres (4.0 mi) upstream of "Claytons Corner" which provides marine access to Melaleuca. With the exception of the waters around the harbour entrance, most of the harbour has a relatively flat seabed with an average depth of 7 metres (23 ft). As with almost all of the estuarine system including the Bathurst Channel, the seabed falls sharply from the shore before hitting the level floor of the harbour which forms a gently sloping basin of mud and gravel with a maximum depth of 9.1 metres (30 ft) near Dixon Island. Waters within a 2–3-kilometre (1.2–1.9 mi) radius of the harbour entrance vary greatly in depth with three deep channels branching out from the entrance leaving deep shoals in between at a depth of 5 metres (16 ft). The true deepest point in the harbour is where the three channels meet between Platypus Point and Nixon Point which reaches 29 metres (95 ft) due to the dredging action of the tide.

Bathurst Harbour, like the rest of the Bathurst Channel, is a ria formation caused by the inundation of a large valley and its associated alluvial plains. The glacially carved landscape of the region has resulted in the shape of the estuarine system being greatly different to other ria formations around Tasmania such as the Derwent Estuary, instead bearing close resemblance to artificial impoundments like Lake Pedder, 30 kilometres (19 mi) to the north.

Bathurst Harbour is one of only two places in the world where the Maugean Skate, endemic to Tasmania, has been reported from. The main population is found in similar habitats in Macquarie Harbour to the north.

== Settlement ==
The land around the harbour is unpopulated with little infrastructure. Most buildings and structures in the vicinity of the harbour are located at Melaleuca which supports an airstrip, several light structures, boat moorings and remains from the tin mines in the early 1900s. A mining department camp was formerly located at Woureddy Bay on Melaleuca Creek and the homestead "Claytons Corner" is located at the mouth of Melaleuca Creek on Forest Lagoon which includes a timber jetty. At present the region has no permanent population, but has in time had a number reclusive inhabitants.

== Access ==
Bathurst Harbour has no vehicular access of any kind. Access is instead provided by either boat, air or walking. The only marine access to the harbour is via the Bathurst Channel from Port Davey. Two walking tracks, South Coast Track and the Port Davey Track, provide land access via either Cockle Creek or Scotts Peak Dam. An airstrip at Melaleuca gives the only aerial access to the region and is in turn connected to the main walking tracks.

== See also ==
- Macquarie Harbour
- Port Davey
