= Ida Bay =

- Town
- Coordinates: 43°26′55″S 146°55′57″E
- Country: Australia
- State: Tasmania
- Region: South-east
- LGA: Huon Valley
- Location: 68 km (42 mi) S of Huonville

Government
  - State electorate: Franklin
  - Federal division: Franklin

Population
  - Total: 9 (2016 census)
- Postcode: 7109
Localities around Ida Bay
Lune River	Lune River estuary, Lune River	Southport (Bay)
Lune River	Ida Bay	Southport Lagoon
Lune River	Southport Lagoon, Lune River	Southport Lagoon

Ida Bay is a rural locality in the local government area (LGA) of Huon Valley in the South-east LGA region of Tasmania. The locality is about 68 kilometres (42 mi) south of the town of Huonville. The 2016 census recorded a population of 9 for the state suburb of Ida Bay.

== History ==
Ida Bay is a confirmed locality.

== Geography ==
Much of the northern boundary follows the shoreline of the waters of the Lune River estuary, known as Ida Bay, Hastings Bay and Southport.

== Road infrastructure ==
Route C636 (Line River Road) runs through from north-west to south-west.

== See also ==
- Ida Bay Railway
