= List of bushwalking tracks of Tasmania =

Tasmania is well known for its bush walking tracks. Even though Tasmania is a small island, more than forty percent of its land area is protected. Therefore, there are plenty of places to go bush walking in Tasmania.

== Bush-walking tracks ==
Cradle Mountain
Name	Length	Time	Difficulty
Dove Lake	-	2 hours	Easy
Cradle Mountain	-	-	-

Great Western Tiers Region
Name	Length	Time	Difficulty
Liffey Falls	7.2 km return	2.5 hours	Easy
Meander Falls	7.8 km return	6 hours	Medium-Hard
Mother Cummings Peak	-	3 hours	Medium
Quamby Bluff	5.8 km return	3 hours	Medium

Mersey Valley
Name	Length	Time	Difficulty
Lees Paddocks	14.2 km return	6 hours	Easy-Medium
Walls of Jerusalem	23.8 km return	9.5 hours	Hard

North East
Name	Length	Time	Difficulty
Cataract Gorge	13.6 km return	4.5 hours	Medium
Legges Tor	7.6 km return	3 hours	Easy
Mount Arthur	9 km return	4.5 hours	Medium

North Coast
Name	Length	Time	Difficulty
Archers Knob	-	-	-
Mount Roland	-	-	Medium-Hard

Overland Track
Name	Length	Time	Difficulty				
Mount Pelion East	-	-	-	Mount Pelion West	-	-	-
Mount Oakleigh	-	-	-				
Mount Ossa	-	-	-				
Arm River Track |22.2 km ret -	7.0 hours	Medium -					
Pine Valley	-	-	-				
The Acropolis	-	-	-				
The Labyrinth	-	-	-				
Barn Bluff	-	-	-				
Cradle Mountain	-	-	-				

The South West
Name	Length	Time	Difficulty
Frenchmans Cap	-	-	-
Western Arthurs- descending at Kappa Moraine		5–6 days	Difficult- with icy weather
South Coast Track	-	-	-
Port Davey Track	-	-	-
Federation Peak	-	5 hours	-
