= Hastings Caves State Reserve =

State reserve in Tasmania, Australia

Hastings Cave
- Hastings Cave State Reserve
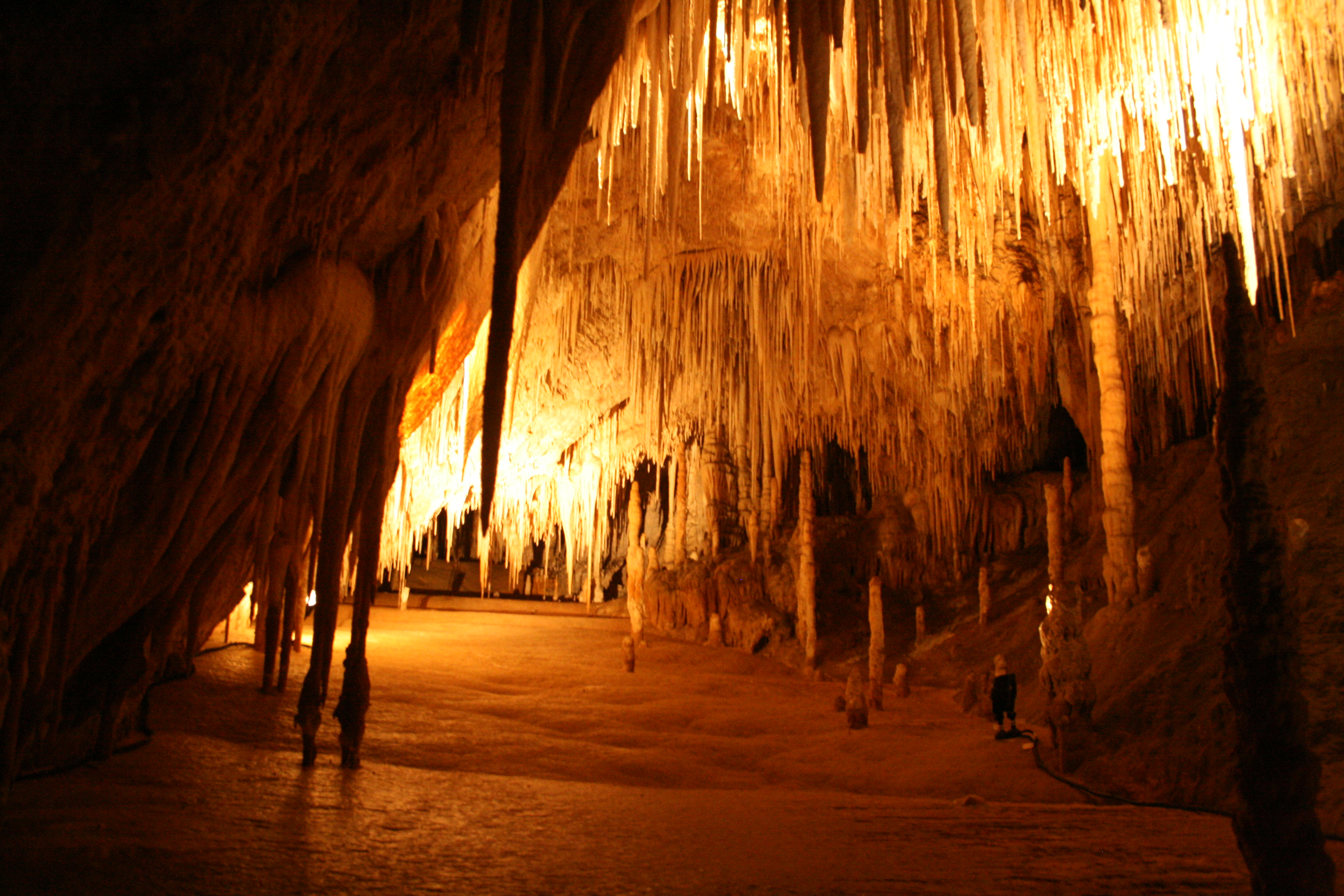
- Newdegate cave, Tasmania.

- Location within Tasmania
- Location: Southern Tasmania, Australia
- Coordinates: 43°22′48″S 146°51′00″E
- Discovery: 1917 (European)
- Geology: dolomite
- Show cave opened: Newdegate Cave
- Lighting: Yes
- Website: https://parks.tas.gov.au/explore-our-parks/hastings-caves-state-reserve

The Hastings Caves State Reserve is the setting of a complex of caves and a natural warm springs located 102 km (63 mi) south of Hobart, Tasmania, Australia. Newdegate Cave, the largest dolomite cave in Australia open to tourists, is a part of the complex. They are located 5 kilometres (3.1 mi) from the nearby Lune River fossil/gem centre and the Ida Bay Railway.

The complex features natural warm springs, which cause many of the local streams to be at a year-round temperature of 28 °C (82 °F). This feeds a swimming pool at the Hastings Visitor Centre, which is available to visitors to swim in.

The Hastings Visitor Centre was built in 2001 by Tasmanian Parks and Wildlife. Offering information, ticket sales, food and drink, souvenirs and free public WiFi. The centre is a hub for the growing number of tourists that visit the Far South of Tasmania.

== History ==
The caves were discovered in 1917 by timber workers cutting trees near the entrance of the cave. The caves were initially opened up to tourists in the 1920s, and later the state government stepped in and took control during the Great Depression. Steps and a road to the cave were completed as part of depression era construction work to spur the economy, and the cave was officially opened by Albert Ogilvie, Premier of Tasmania, in 1939.

Newdegate Cave was named after Francis Newdegate, the Governor of Tasmania between 1917 and 1920.

== Gallery ==
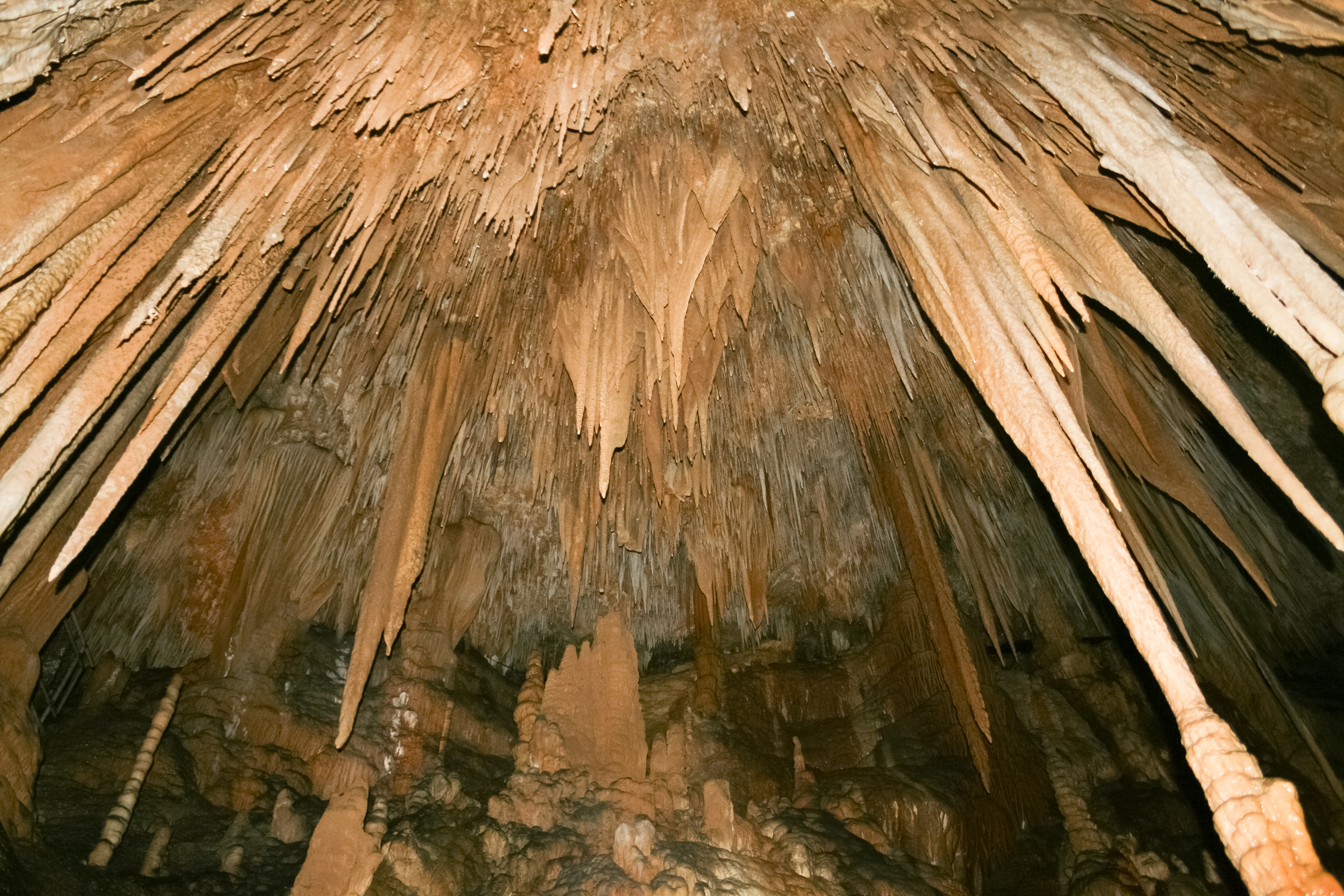

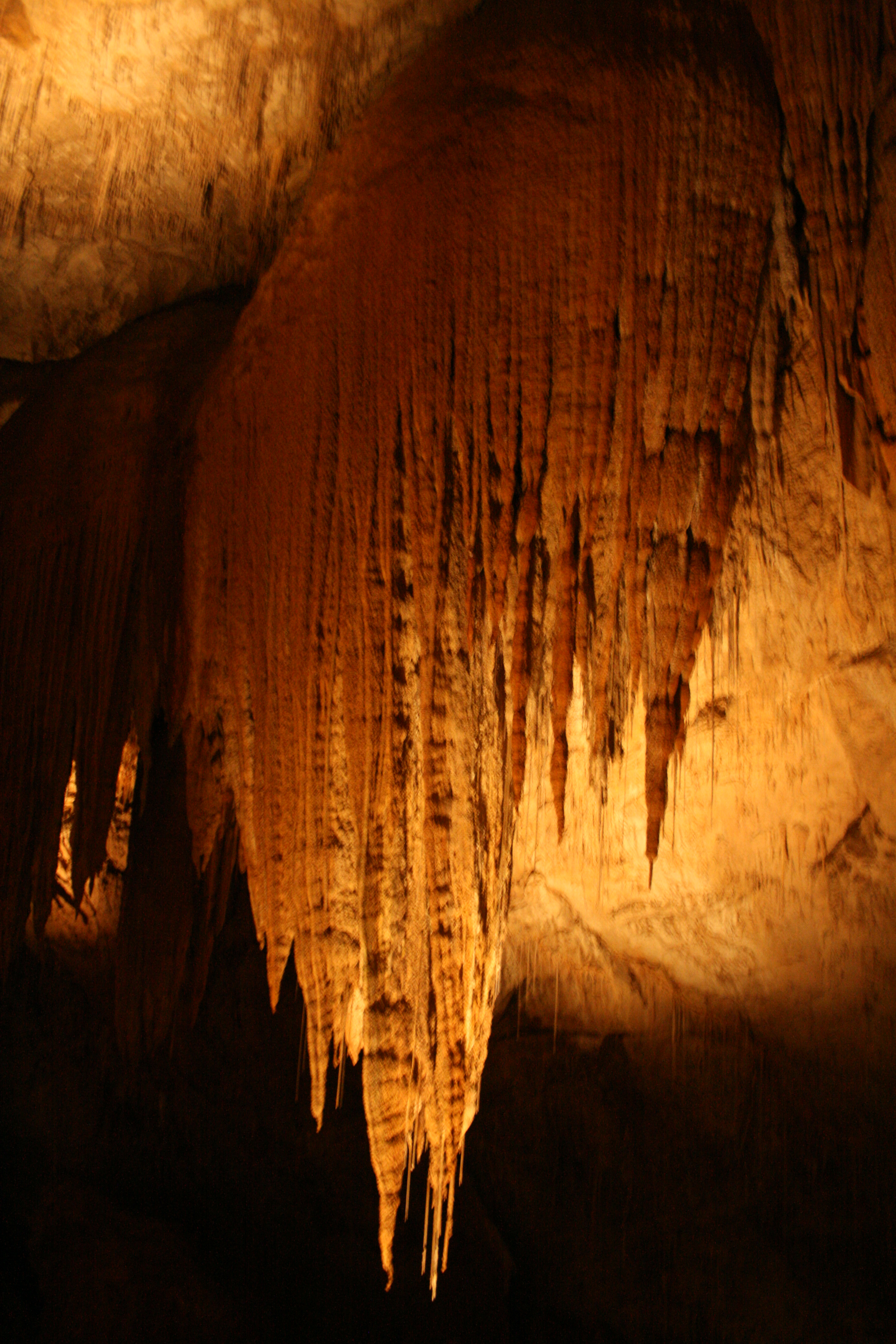

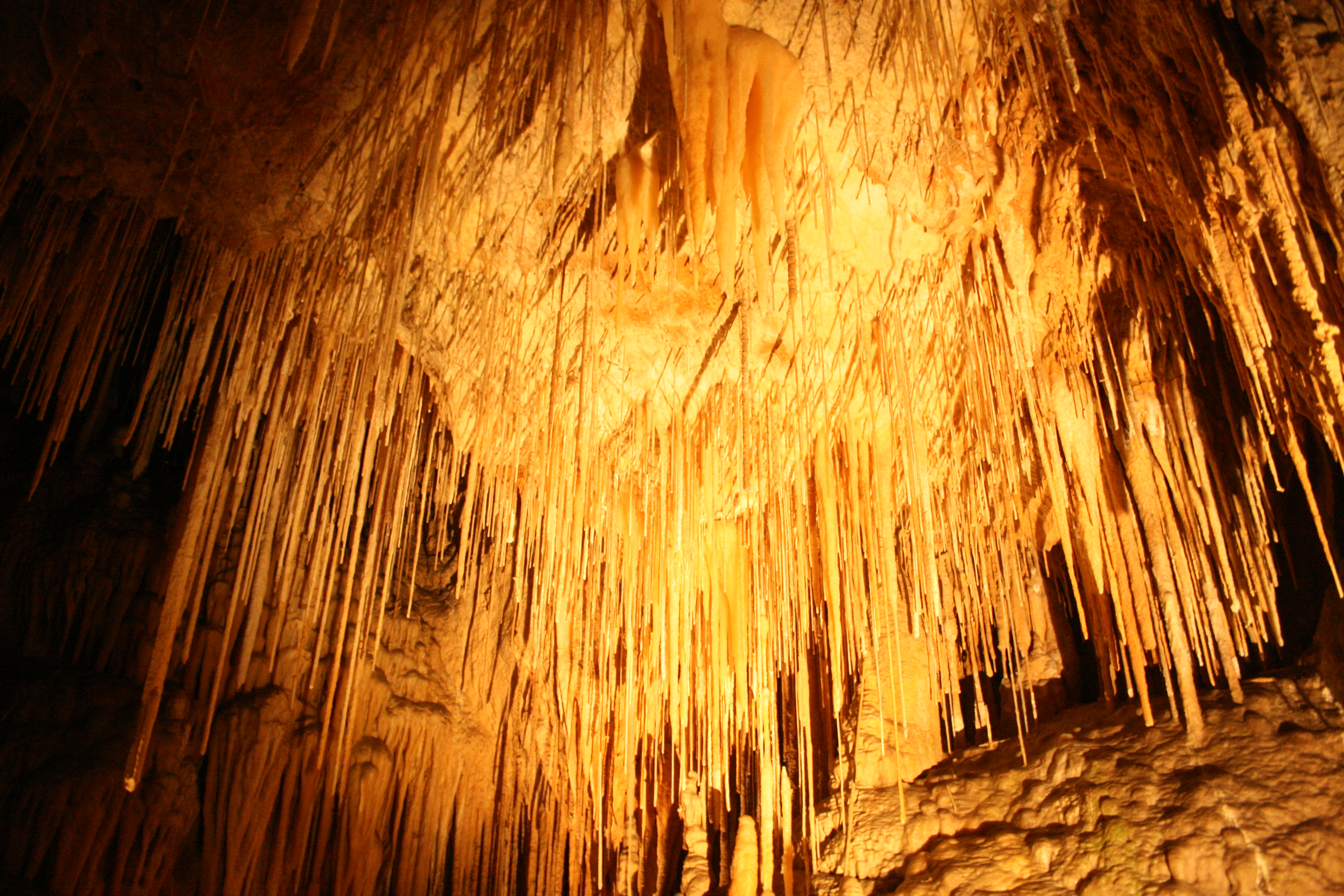

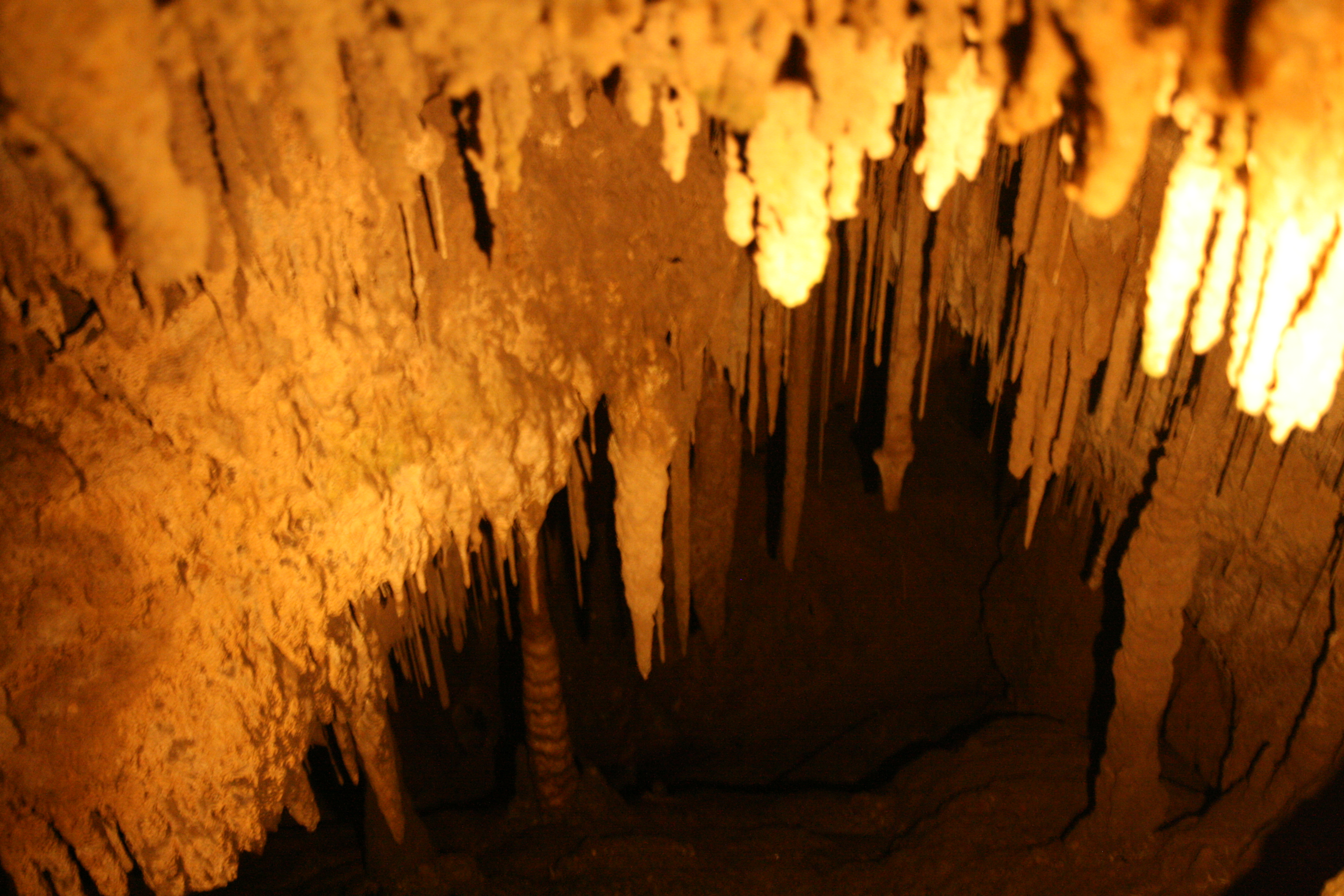

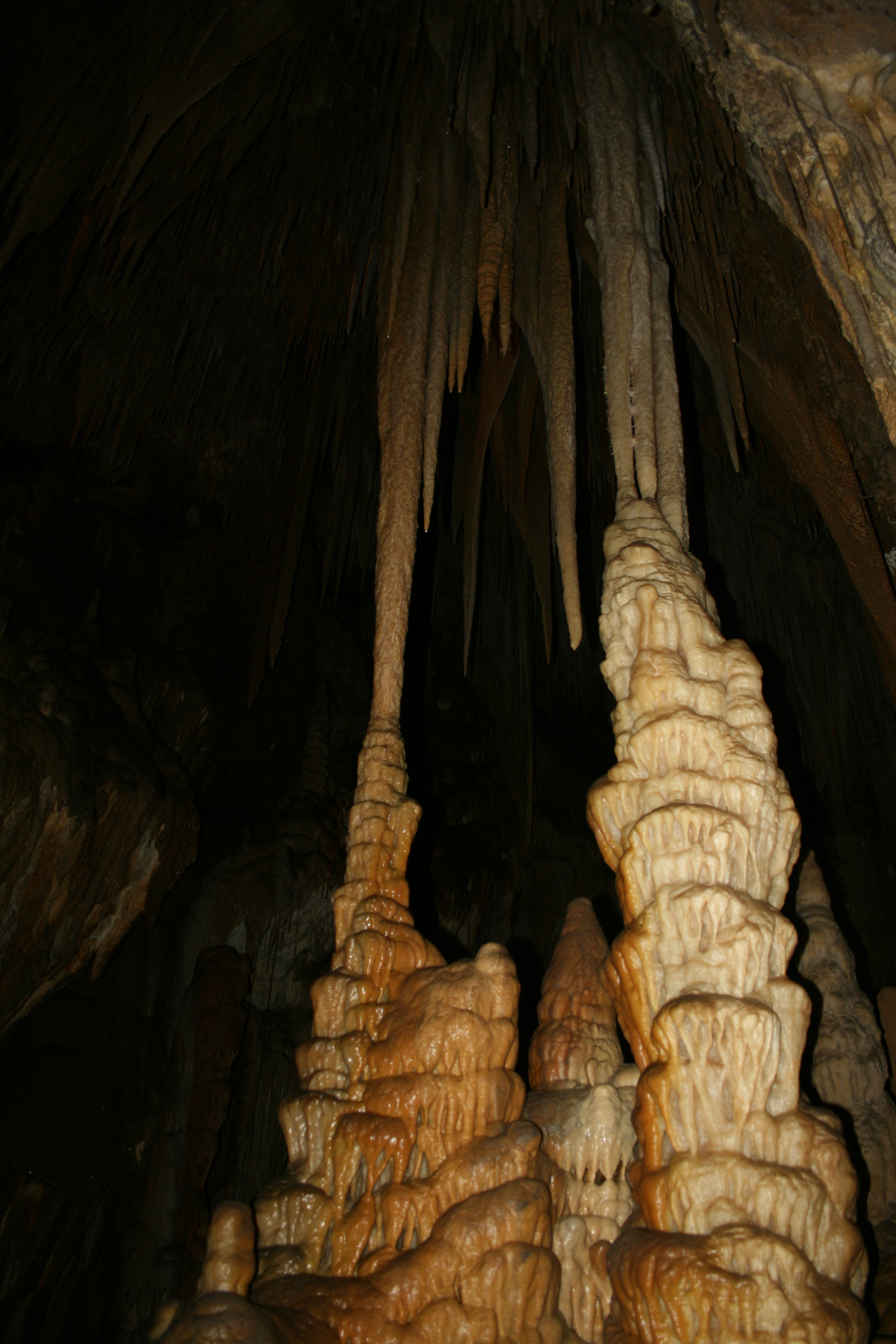

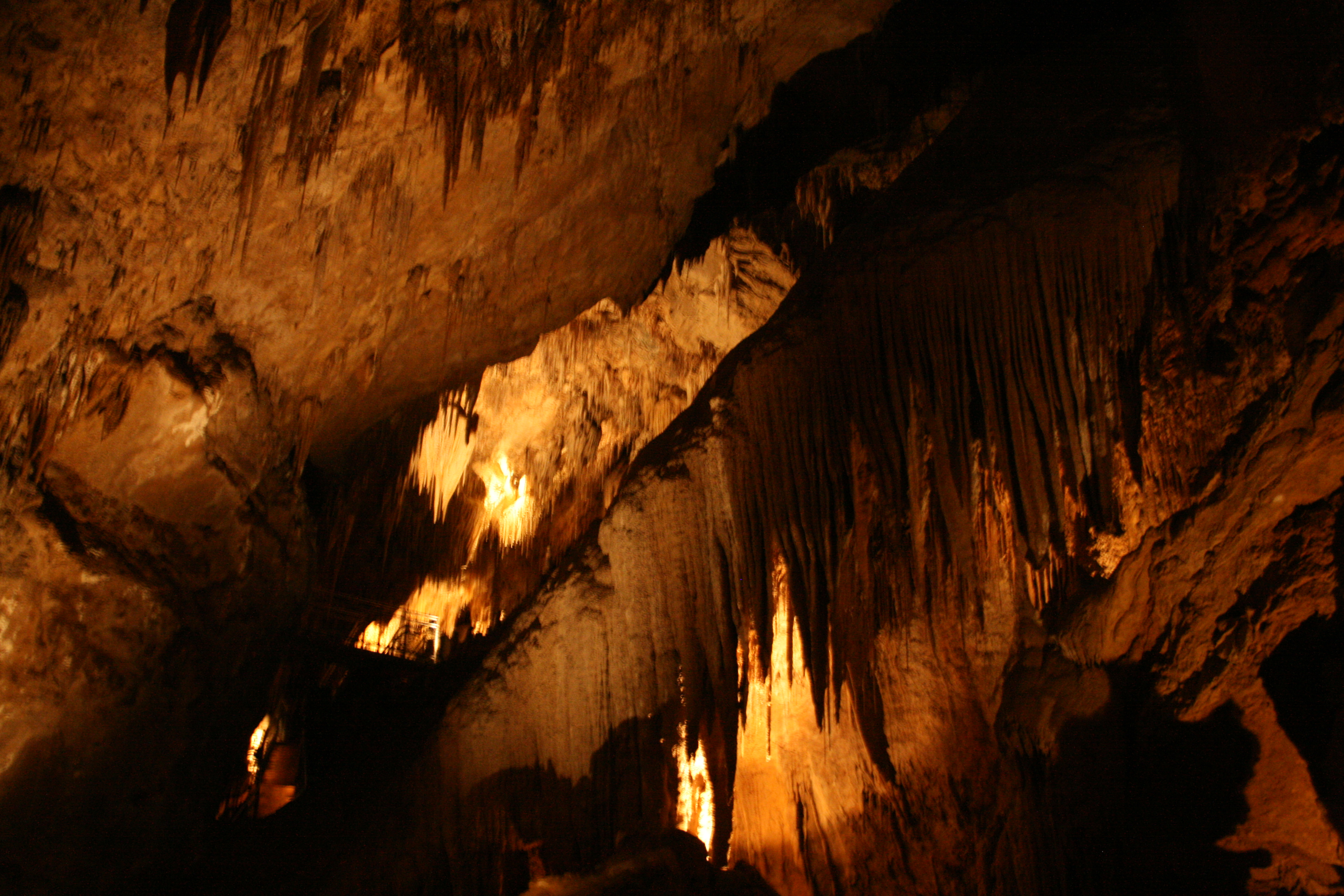

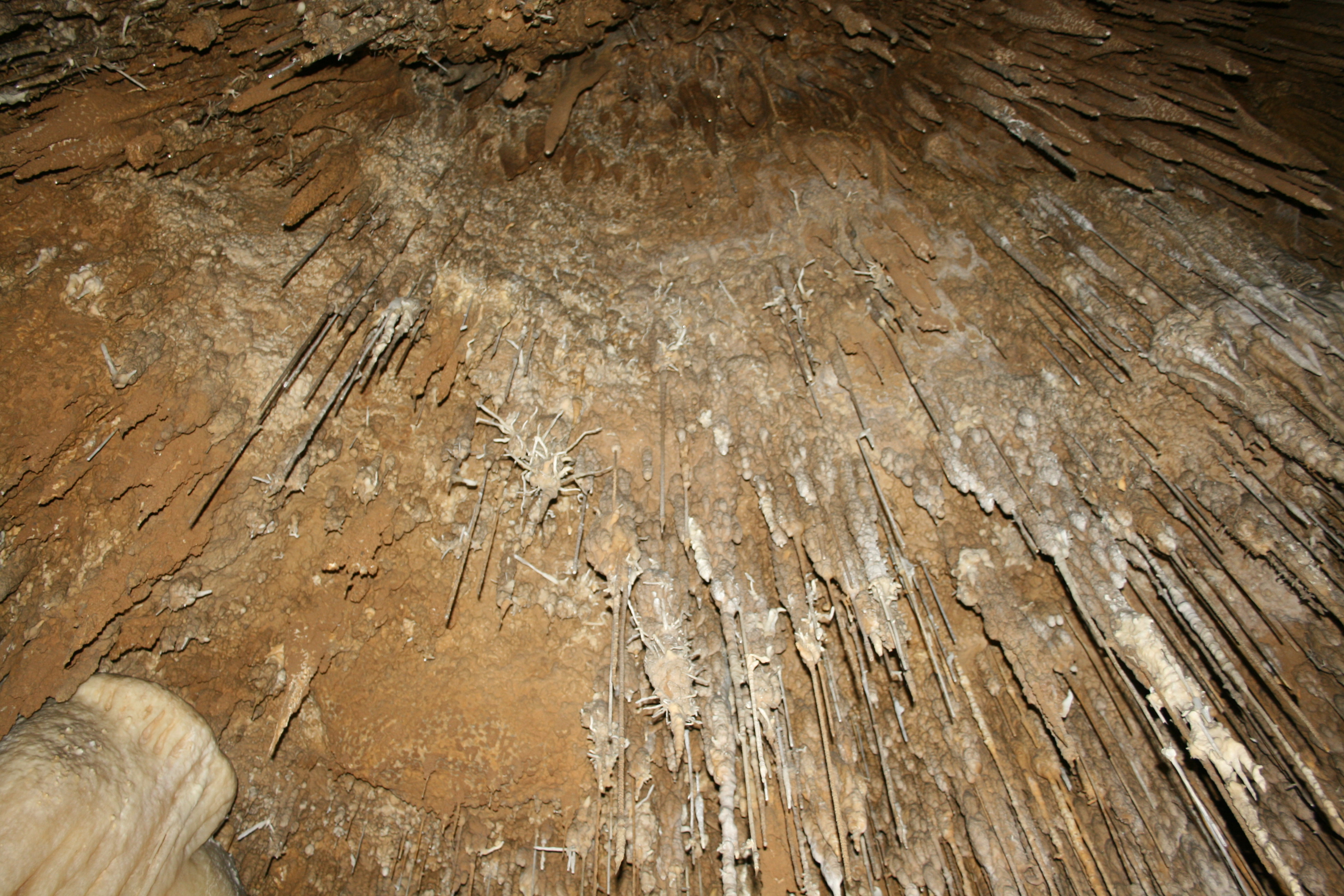

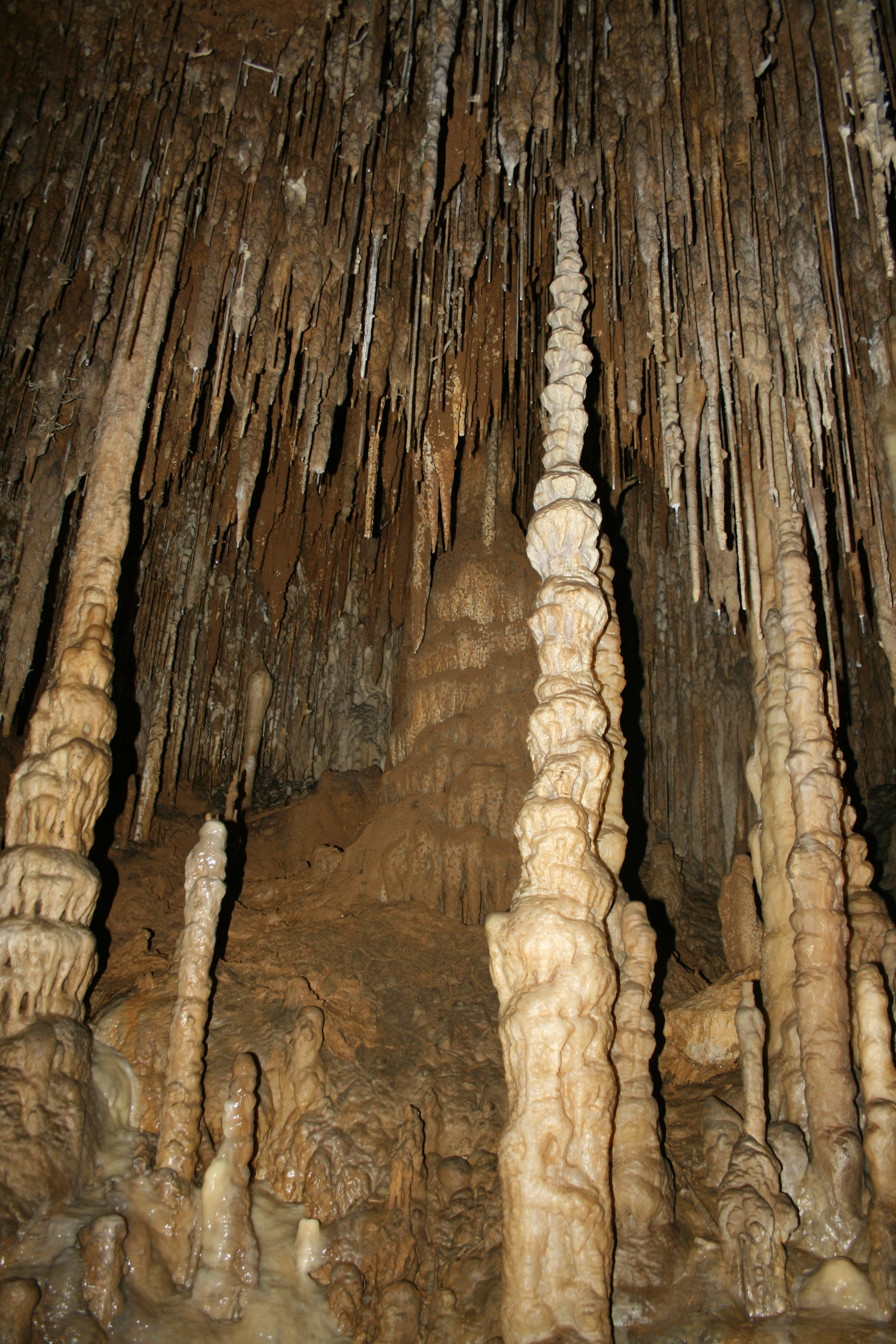

== See also ==
- List of caves in Tasmania
