= Munday Island =

Island in Tasmania, Australia

- Location within Tasmania

Geography
- Location: Between Port Davey and Bathurst Channel
- Coordinates: 43°19′48″S 146°00′36″E
- Archipelago: Breaksea Islands Group
- Adjacent to: Southern Ocean

Administration
- Australia
- State: Tasmania
- Region: South West

Demographics
- Population: 0

Munday Island is a small island that lies between Port Davey, an oceanic inlet, and Bathurst Channel, located in the south west region of Tasmania, Australia. The island is contained with the Southwest National Park, part of the Tasmanian Wilderness World Heritage Site and the Port Davey/Bathurst Harbour Marine Nature Reserve.

== Features and location ==
Part of the Breaksea Islands Group, Munday Island is also part of the Port Davey Islands Important Bird Area, so identified by BirdLife International because of its importance for breeding seabirds. The island's vegetation is dominated by thick Melaleuca scrub. Forest ravens have been recorded as breeding on the island.

== See also ==
- List of islands of Tasmania
