= Recherche, Tasmania =

Recherche
- Town
- Coordinates: 43°32′15″S 146°53′19″E
- Country: Australia
- State: Tasmania
- Region: South-east
- LGA: Huon Valley
- Location: 78 km (48 mi) SW of Huonville

Government
  - State electorate: Franklin
  - Federal division: Franklin

Population
  - Total: 8 (2016 census)
- Postcode: 7109
Localities around Recherche
Southwest	Southwest, Lune River	Southport Lagoon, Lune River
Southwest	Recherche	Tasman Sea, Southport Lagoon
Southwest	Southwest	Southwest

Recherche is a rural locality on the shore of Recherche Bay in the local government area of Huon Valley in the South-east region of Tasmania. It is located about 78 kilometres (48 mi) south-west of the town of Huonville. The 2016 census recorded a population of 8 for the state suburb of Recherche.

== History ==
Recherche is a confirmed suburb/locality.

== Geography ==
The Tasman Sea forms much of the eastern boundary.

== Road infrastructure ==
The C636 route (South Cape Road / Cockle Creek Road) enters from the north-east and runs generally south until it reaches the south-eastern corner, where it ends.
