= Port Davey Track =

Bushwalking track in Tasmania, Australia

Port Davey Track Old Port Davey Track
- Length: 70 kilometres (43 mi)
- Location: South West Tasmania, Australia
- Established: 1898
- Designation: Tasmanian Wilderness World Heritage Site
- Trailheads: Scotts Peak Dam Road (north); Melaleuca (south)
- Use: Hiking
- Sights: Bathurst Channel
- Website: http://www.parks.tas.gov.au/index.aspx?base=2265

The Port Davey Track, officially the Old Port Davey Track, is a bushwalking track located in the south western region of Tasmania, Australia. The 70-kilometre (43 mi) track traverses remote wilderness within the Southwest National Park, part of the Tasmanian Wilderness World Heritage Site, and is managed as a wilderness walk. The Tasmanian Parks & Wildlife Service recommend that experienced bushwalkers can take four-to-five days to cover the track in one direction.

The track may be combined with the South Coast Track as a long continuous trek requiring around eight to fourteen days.

The track draws its name from Port Davey, an oceanic inlet named in honour of Thomas Davey, a former Governor of Tasmania.

== Features and location ==
From the Scotts Peak Dam Road in the north, the track trailhead is located adjacent to the Huon Campground (43°02′24″S 146°17′24″E), the southern terminus of the Scotts Peak Dam Road. The track heads south towards the Arthur Range and then west to the Crossing Plains. Further south, the track runs adjacent to the Crossing River, moving through the Lost World Plateau, following the Erskine Range to the west and the Rugby Range to the east. The track crosses the Spring River before it reaches the eastern side of Jo Page Bay, and to the point of crossing the Bathurst Channel, west of Bathurst Harbour. The track's southern terminus is at Melaleuca where the track converges with the South Coast Track at the Melaleuca Visitor Services Site of the Parks & Wildlife Service (43°25′08″S 146°09′25″E).

The Tasmanian Parks & Wildlife Service recommend trek time as follows:

- Scotts Peak to Junction Creek - 3 hours
- Junction Creek to Watershed Camp - 8 hours
- Watershed Camp to Spring River - 5 hours
- Spring River to Melaleuca - 10 hours

Approximately 200 people walk the Port Davey track annually.

== See also ==
- List of bushwalking tracks of Tasmania
