= Fitzroy Islands (Tasmania) =

Islands in Tasmania, Australia

- Location within Tasmania

Geography
- Location: Payne Bay, Port Davey
- Coordinates: 43°13′48″S 145°56′24″E
- Archipelago: Breaksea Islands Group
- Adjacent to: Southern Ocean
- Total islands: 4
- Area: 0.18 ha (0.44 acres)

Administration
- Australia
- State: Tasmania
- Region: South West

Demographics
- Population: 0

The Fitzroy Islands comprise a group of four rocky islets that lie within the upper reaches of Payne Bay in Port Davey, an oceanic inlet, located in the south west region of Tasmania, Australia. The islands have a combined area of approximately 0.18 hectares (0.44 acres) and are contained with the Southwest National Park, part of the Tasmanian Wilderness World Heritage Site and the Port Davey/Bathurst Harbour Marine Nature Reserve.

== Features and location ==
Part of the Breaksea Islands Group, the Fitzroy Islands are part of the Port Davey Islands Important Bird Area, so identified by BirdLife International because of its importance for breeding seabirds. Recorded breeding seabird species are the silver gull, sooty oystercatcher and Caspian tern.

== See also ==
- List of islands of Tasmania
