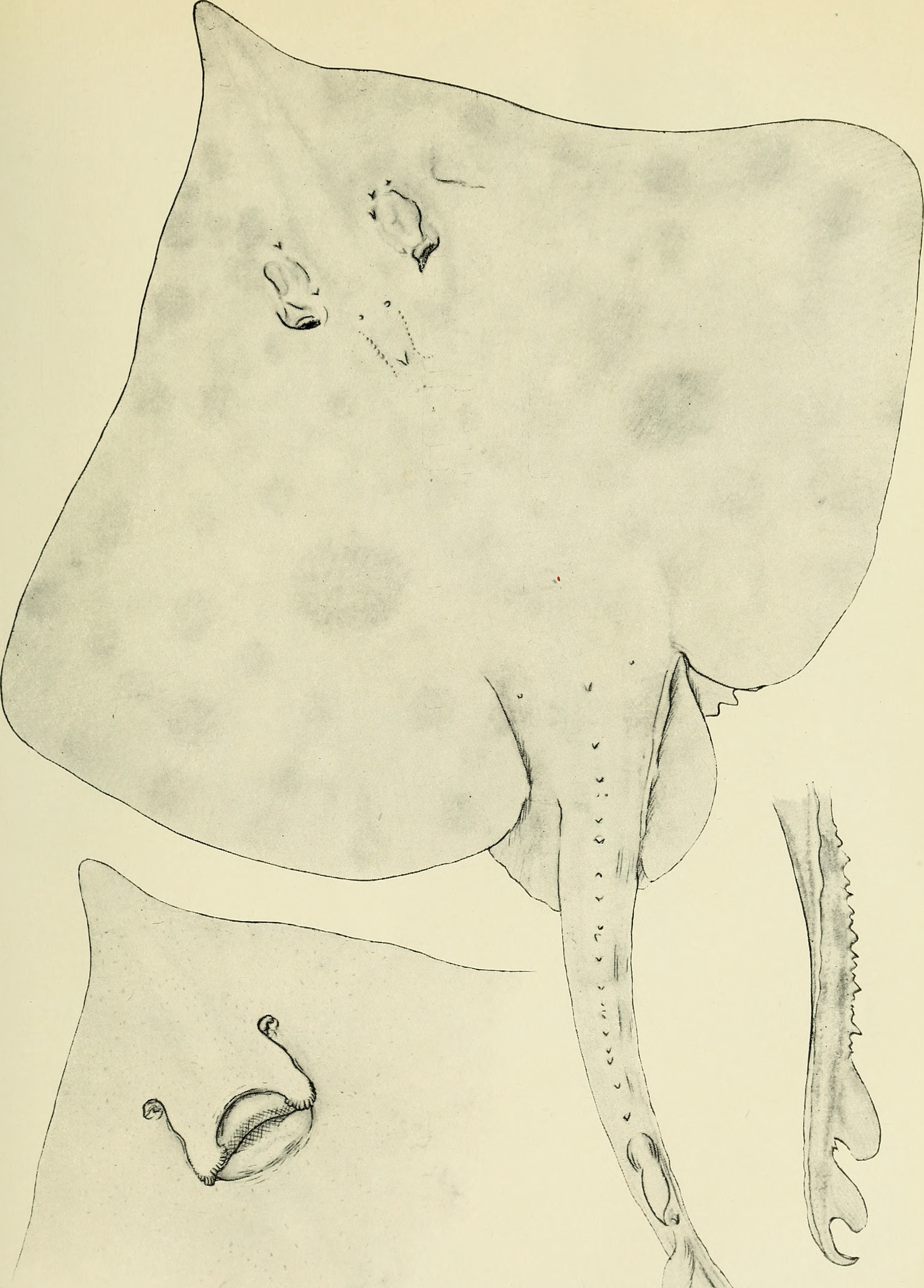
- Zearaja nasuta by Joyce Allan

Scientific classification
- Kingdom: Animalia
- Phylum: Chordata
- Class: Chondrichthyes
- Subclass: Elasmobranchii
- Order: Rajiformes
- Family: Rajidae
- Genus: Zearaja; Whitley, 1939

Type species
- Raja nasuta J. P. Müller & Henle, 1841

= Zearaja =

Genus of cartilaginous fishes

Zearaja is a small genus of skates in the family Rajidae. It currently consists of four described species found in oceans off New Zealand, Tasmania and southern South America.

== Species ==
There are four species in the genus:

- Zearaja brevicaudata (Marini, 1933) (Short tail yellownose skate)
- Zearaja chilensis (Guichenot, 1848) (Yellownose skate)
- Zearaja maugeana (Last & Gledhill, 2007) (Maugean skate)
- Zearaja nasuta (J. P. Müller & Henle, 1841) (New Zealand rough skate)
