= Southport Lagoon =

- Town
- Coordinates: 43°28′43″S 146°55′26″E
- Country: Australia
- State: Tasmania
- Region: South-east
- LGA: Huon Valley
- Location: 71 km (44 mi) S of Huonville

Government
  - State electorate: Franklin
  - Federal division: Franklin

Population
  - Total: nil (2016 census)
- Postcode: 7109
Localities around Southport Lagoon
Ida Bay	Ida Bay	Tasman Sea
Recherche	Southport Lagoon	Tasman Sea
Tasman Sea	Tasman Sea	Tasman Sea

Southport Lagoon is a rural locality in the local government area (LGA) of Huon Valley in the South-east LGA region of Tasmania. The locality is about 71 kilometres (44 mi) south of the town of Huonville. The 2016 census recorded a population of nil for the state suburb of Southport Lagoon.

== History ==
Southport Lagoon is a confirmed locality.

== Geography ==
The waters of the Tasman Sea form the eastern and southern boundaries. Southport Lagoon, the body of water, is contained within the locality.

== Road infrastructure ==
Route C636 (South Cape Road) passes to the west.
