= Maugean skate =

Conservation status
- Endangered (IUCN 3.1)

Scientific classification
- Kingdom: Animalia
- Phylum: Chordata
- Class: Chondrichthyes
- Subclass: Elasmobranchii
- Order: Rajiformes
- Family: Rajidae
- Genus: Dipturus
- Species: D. maugeanus

Binomial name
- Dipturus maugeanus Last & Gledhill, 2007

Synonyms
- Dipturus maugeana (Last & Gledhill 2007) [orth. error]; Raja sp. L; Zearaja maugeana Last & Gledhill, 2007

Species of fish endemic to Tasmania

The Maugean skate or Port Davey skate (Dipturus maugeanus, alternatively Zearaja maugeana) is an endangered species of fish in the family Rajidae. Also known as the 'thylacine of the sea', it is endemic to Tasmania, only found in the brackish estuarine waters of Macquarie Harbour and Bathurst Harbour. The species was discovered in 1988 by Dr Graham Edgar. It was named in honour of René Maugé, a zoologist on the Baudin expedition to Australia, who died in Tasmania in 1802 and was buried on Maria Island.

The skate is recognised as one of the Gondwana-era natural values of Tasmania's Wilderness World Heritage Area (TWWHA). Its potential extinction carries global significance.

== Description ==
The Maugean skate is a medium-sized skate with a maximum total length of approximately 74 cm in males and 87 cm in females. It has a quadrangular disc-shaped body, a narrowly pointed, elongated snout and dark-edged ventral pores. The dorsal surface of the skate is almost uniformly dark grey to brown with small and faint white spots. The tail is moderately broad at the base and tapers towards large dorsal fins. Males have three rows of thorns along the tail, whereas females have five.

The Maugean skate is distinguishable from other, closely related Zearaja species by its smaller adult size, longer snout and smoother dorsal surface. The only other skate species known within its distribution is the thornback skate (Dentiraja lemprieri) which can be distinguished by its smaller size, brown to grey-black dorsal surface with fine spots and reticulations, short, rounded snout and long, narrow claspers.

== Distribution and habitat ==
The Maugean skate is restricted to brackish, estuarine waters in two isolated estuaries on the west coast of Tasmania; Macquarie Harbour and Bathurst Harbour. No individuals have been found in marine waters outside of these harbours. Its preferred habitat is benthic, in shallow channels between 5 and 15 metres in depth with poor light penetration, high tannin loads in the water and silty substrate.

There have been only four confirmed observations of the species in Bathurst Harbour, the last in 1992. Multiple surveys between 1992 and 2022 have failed to verify the presence of the species there, and recent eDNA samples collected in 2022 have detected minimal levels of Maugean skate DNA. This suggests it may be either locally extinct, vagrant, or occurring in very small numbers.

== Diet ==
The Maugean skate holds a high trophic position (3.7) in the food web. Their diet consists of benthic prey species, with crustaceans as their dominant prey type.

== Conservation status ==
The Maugean skate is listed as Endangered on the IUCN Red List of Threatened Species, as well as under the Australian Government Environment Protection and Biodiversity Conservation Act 1999 on the national level and under the Tasmanian Government Threatened Species Protection Act 1995 on the state level, as the synonym Zearaja maugeana.

Research by The Australia Institute indicates that 58 percent of Australians are in favour of stopping the farming of salmon in Macquarie Harbour, which, if it continues, could cause the extinction of the Maugean skate. Australian national environment law requires that the federal Environment Minister reconsider,"as soon as practicable, the decision that originally permitted large-scale salmon farming in Macquarie Harbour.

The Australia Institute has written an open letter to UNESCO and the IUCN encouraging appropriate action to protect the Maugean skate and ensure the heritage values of the TWWHA are preserved.

In previous submissions, the Australia Institute recommended a significant increase in fully protected areas, greater state government accountability, and full implementation of the proposed Macquarie Island Marine Park expansion. More than 80 organisations worldwide have called for an end to greenwashing practices linked to farmed salmon certifications, citing the role of the industry in the potential extinction of the critically endangered Maugean skate.
