= Lune River (Tasmania) =

River in Tasmania, Australia

Lune
- Location of the Lune River mouth in Tasmania

Location
- Country: Australia
- State: Tasmania
- Region: South East

Physical characteristics
- Source: Moonlight Ridge
  - location: Southwest National Park
  - coordinates: 43°28′15″S 146°44′56″E
  - elevation: 852 m (2,795 ft)
- Mouth: Hastings Bay, Tasman Sea
  - location: near Lune River
  - coordinates: 43°26′21″S 146°55′18″E
  - elevation: 0 m (0 ft)
- Length: 21 km (13 mi)

Basin features
- National park: Southwest National Park

The Lune River is a perennial river in south-eastern Tasmania, Australia.

== Course and features ==
The river rises below Moonlight Ridge in the Southwest National Park and flows generally east, joined by four minor tributaries and past the town of the same name before reaching its mouth and emptying into Hastings Bay, eventually flowing into the Tasman Sea. The river descends 855 metres (2,805 ft) over its 21-kilometre (13 mi) course.

== See also ==
- List of rivers of Australia § Tasmania
