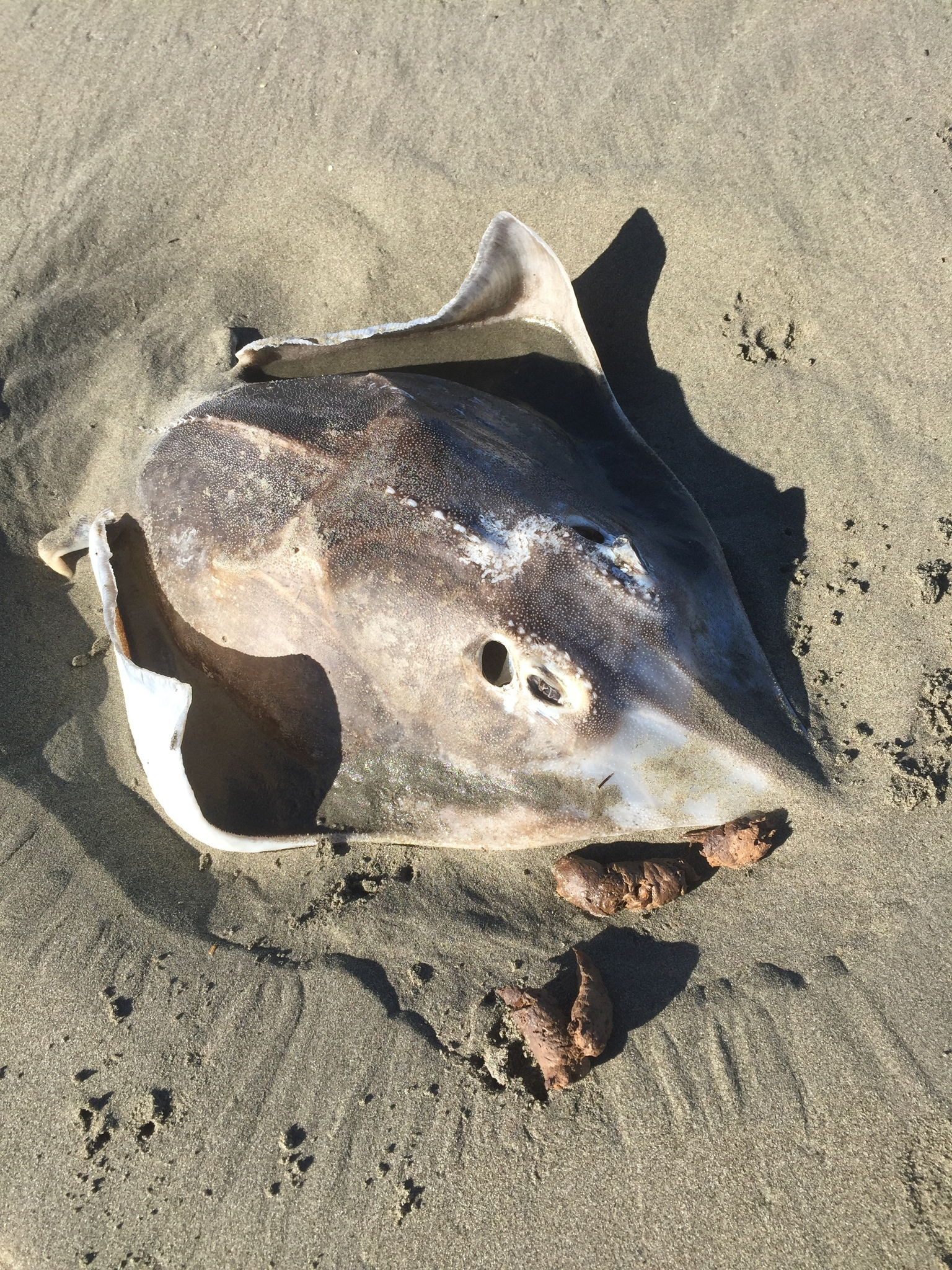

Conservation status
- Least Concern (IUCN 3.1)

Scientific classification
- Kingdom: Animalia
- Phylum: Chordata
- Class: Chondrichthyes
- Subclass: Elasmobranchii
- Order: Rajiformes
- Family: Rajidae
- Genus: Zearaja
- Species: Z. nasuta

Binomial name
- Zearaja nasuta (Banks ex Müller & Henle, 1841)

= New Zealand rough skate =

Species of cartilaginous fish

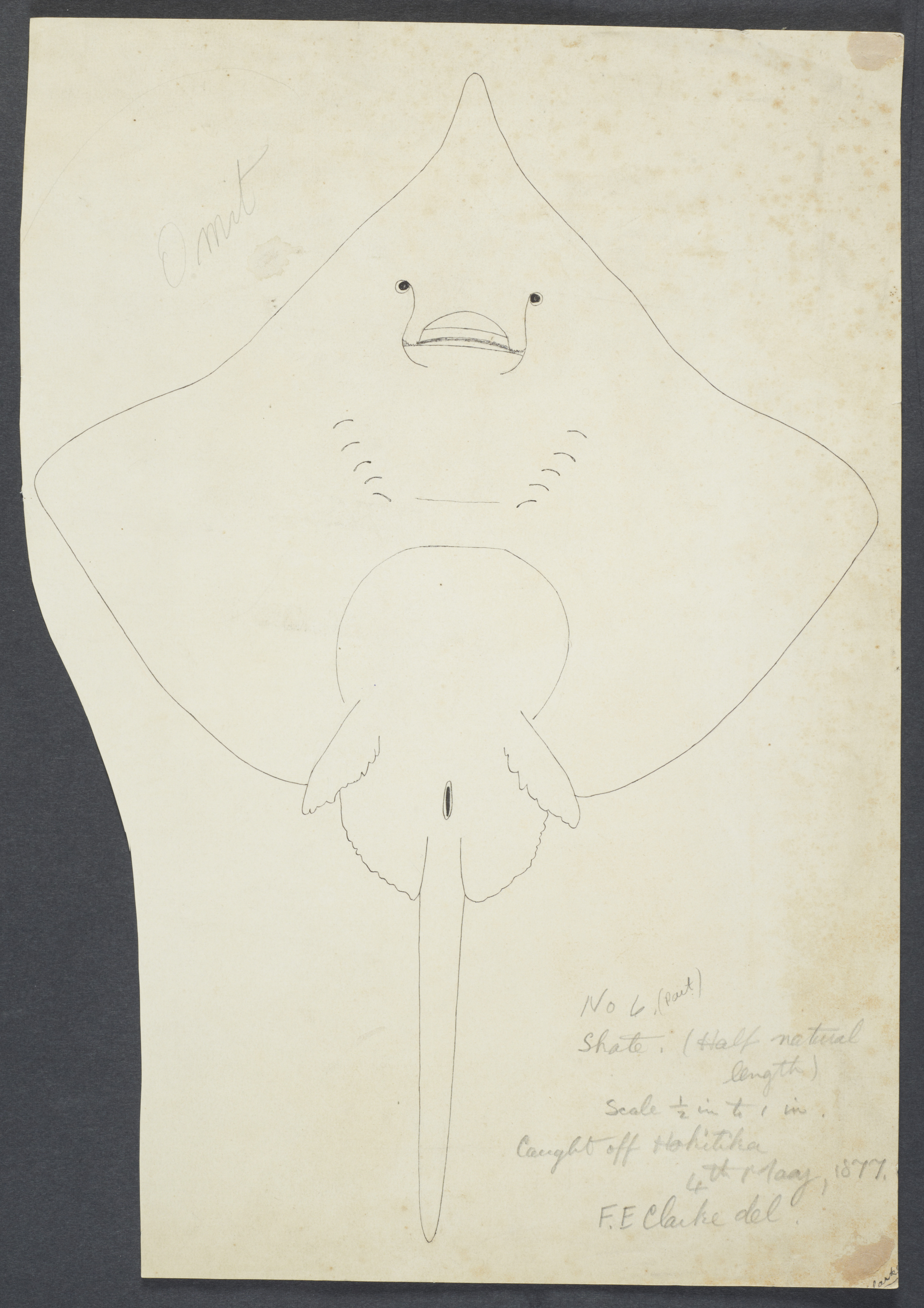
1877 sketch of Zearaja nasuta by Frank Edward Clarke

The New Zealand rough skate (Zearaja nasuta) is a skate of the genus Zearaja, found around New Zealand at depths between 10 and 1,500 m. Its length is up to 1 m. This species has been assessed by the IUCN as of Least Concern. In June 2018 the New Zealand Department of Conservation classified the New Zealand rough skate as "Not Threatened" with the qualifier "Conservation Dependant" under the New Zealand Threat Classification System.

== Names ==
In English, Zearaja nasuta is known as the rough skate (or more specifically the New Zealand rough skate). In the indigenous Māori language, it is known by several names: pākaurua, uku, waewae and whai.
