= Ida Bay Railway =

Railway line in Australia

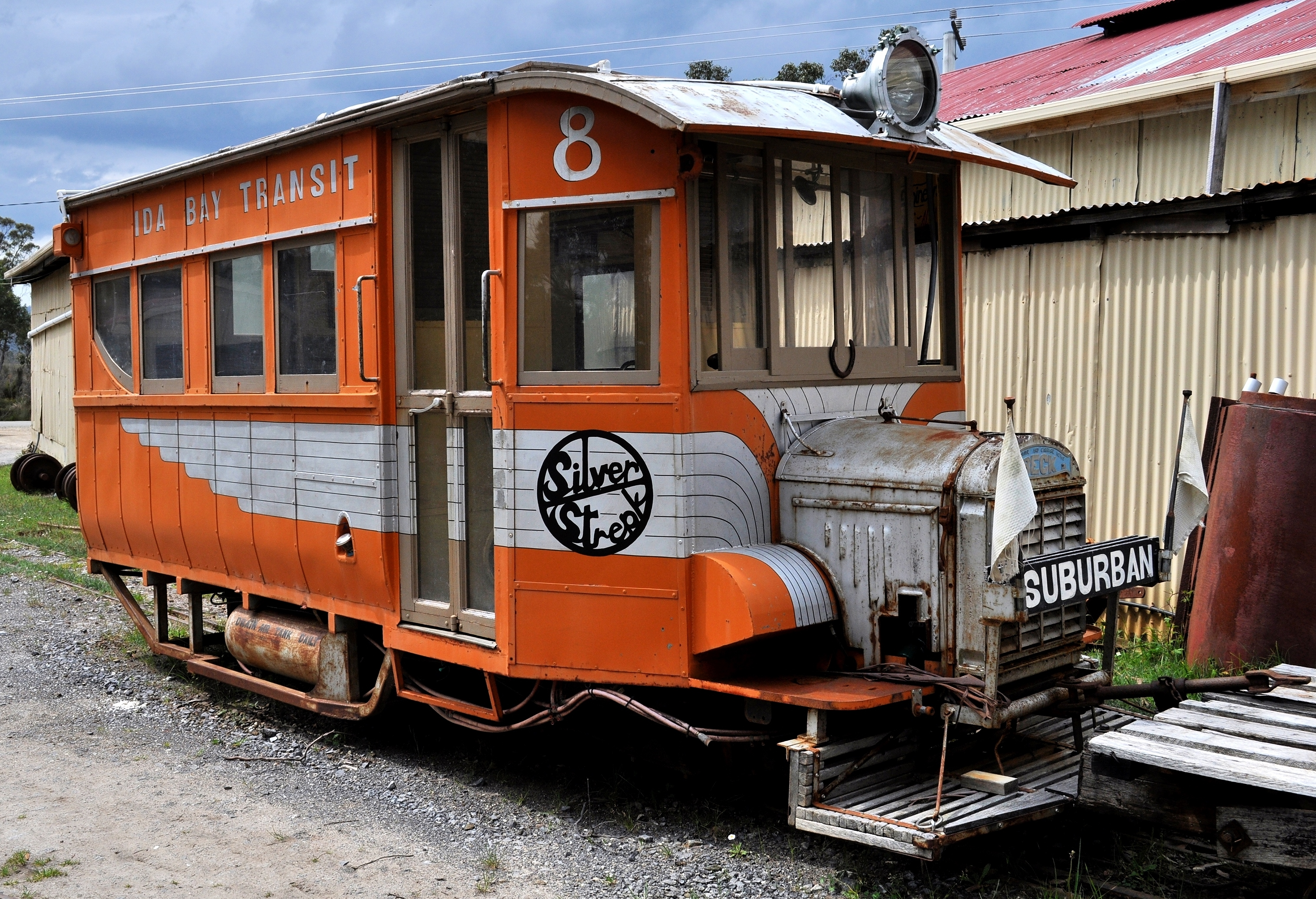

Overview
- Status: Operations suspended
- Owner: Government of Tasmania
- Termini: Lune River; Deep Hole Bay
- Website: www.idabaytrain.org

Service
- Type: Tramway

History
- Opened: ~ 1919
- Closed: June 1975
- Reopened as heritage railway: 20 December 1977

Technical
- Line length: 7 kilometres
- Track gauge: 610 mm (2 ft)

Ida Bay Railway (Tasmania)

The Ida Bay Railway is a 7-kilometre (4.3 mi), 2 ft (610 mm) narrow gauge heritage railway. Located 105 kilometres (65 mi) south of Hobart, Tasmania, it is the most southerly railway in Australia.

== Early history of the area ==
Aboriginal Tasmanians have occupied the island for a time still not precisely measured but confirmed as tens of thousands of years. The traditional owners of the land through which the railway runs were the Lyluequonny people. This clan of the South East nation occupied an area centred on what is now called Recherche Bay. In 1793 French scientists on the d’Entrecasteaux expedition encountered the Lyluequonny. For a period in January 1793, with apparent goodwill and mutual respect, the two groups interacted and bemused each other. Because of the French journals kept at the time more is known about the Lyluequonny clan than any other in pre-European Tasmania.

Following on from the arrival of the British in Tasmania in 1803, whalers, sealers and convicts were the first non-aboriginal inhabitants of the Far South. By 1822 the first land grant was made at Hythe. The area south of Dover was reserved for timber. Convict probation stations were established at Dover and Hythe in the 1840s.

By the early 1850s timber leases were made available and mill towns emerged, including at Lune River, Ramsgate, Hastings and Leprena. This was the start of tramways in the area initially with timber rails and horse power.

== Ida Bay Railway ==
Around 1919 an abandoned timber tramway built to serve the Huon Timber Co's Lune River mill was upgraded and extended by the Hydro Electric Power and Metallurgic Company. The purpose was to transport limestone from a quarry at Marble Hill just south of Hastings Cave to a jetty at Brick Point, Ida Bay. The limestone was then loaded onto river ships, taken to Electrona in North-West Bay south of Hobart and used in the preparation of calcium carbide. This was mainly used for the production of acetylene gas.

== Heritage railway ==
In June 1975, freight operations ceased. Following strong community action in support of keeping the railway operating it was purchased by the Tasmanian Government in 1977 and leased to private operators as a tourist attraction. Various lease holders ran the railway for years struggling to make a profit. After a two-year closure, the line re-opened in December 2005.

In September 2018 a train derailment highlighted the poor state of repair of the track, and the Ida Bay train has not run since. The lease held by the operator was terminated with Tasmania Parks and Wildlife Service appointed caretaker owner.

Little has been done to prevent further deterioration of the line, rolling stock and buildings and urgent maintenance and restoration of this heritage listed railway is needed. The Ida Bay Railway Preservation Society Inc was formed and in December 2020 reached an agreement with the government to restore the line.
