= John Béchervaise =

Australian writer, artist, and explorer

John Mayston Béchervaise (11 May 1910 – 13 July 1998) was an Australian writer, photographer, artist, historian and explorer. He is especially notable for his work and achievements in Antarctica.

== Career ==
Béchervaise was educated in Melbourne. He joined Geelong College in 1935 in order to establish a program of outdoor activities for the boys. During the years of the Second World War he studied art history at the Courtauld Institute of Art in London, but returned to Geelong College after the war.

In 1947 he led the first party to land Tasmania's Rodondo Island in Bass Strait, 10 km off the coast of Victoria. In January 1949 he led a mountaineering expedition of the Geelong College Exploration Society to climb the hitherto unclimbed 1224 m Federation Peak in Tasmania.

As well as contributing to the development of outdoor education in Victoria, he was for many years the assistant editor of the Australian magazine Walkabout.

=== Antarctic ===
In the 1950s Béchervaise joined the Australian National Antarctic Research Expeditions (ANARE). He served as field leader on Heard Island in 1953, leading an unsuccessful expedition to climb the 2745 m Mawson Peak of the Big Ben massif, the highest peak on Australian territory.

He also served as station leader at Mawson Station, Antarctica in 1955 and 1959. From there he led field trips of up to 600 km inland, exploring MacRobertson Land and the Prince Charles Mountains region. He was awarded the Polar Medal for this exploration work.

Béchervaise visited American Antarctic bases in 1966 as an Australian observer with Operation Deep Freeze.

John Béchervaise returned to the Antarctic on MV Nanok S on her first trip south with ANARE in the summer of 1979–80 which also carried a large contingent of naval personnel. Béchervaise provided his knowledge to the Naval contingent.

Béchervaise was a highly respected teacher at Geelong Grammar School during the 1960s and early 1970s. He gave many lectures detailing adventures in Antarctica as well as similar escapades in Europe, an altogether inspirational teacher for those lucky enough to be his students. For three weeks in Lent 1963 when he went to the Antarctic islands on the Magga Dan, his lessons were taken by a British student Peter Bottomley, now Sir Peter Bottomley MP.

== Family ==
Béchervaise was married to Lorna Maude Elaine Fearn née Wannan; the couple had one son and three daughters. His family had come from Jersey in the 19th century where there is still a Béchervaise Line.

His paternal great-great-grandfather John Béchervaise (b. 1790, d. 1867) was born in Jersey, but migrated early to Gosport, Hampshire, England married twice and raised his children there, while spending many years as a sailor. As a sailor of many years in Arctic waters, he was one of many awarded the first British Arctic Medal of 1818–1855. He published an anonymous memoir Thirty-Six Years of a Seafaring life by An old Quartermaster in 1839 which was widely distributed and well received. Some sources misspell his name Berchervaise.

His paternal great-grandfather William Philip Béchervaise (b. 1831, d. 1907) was born in Hampshire and was amongst the tens of thousands who travelled to Victoria in the 1850s in search of gold, but then decided to remain. He was the first of that surname to arrive in Australia. He was nearby to the Eureka Stockade and professed to having been "bunted" by a trooper. Appointed to the Victorian Posts and Telegraphs Department in 1856, he was soon promoted as Telegraph Master at Ballarat in 1858, later combining the role as Postmaster. He remained with the Department in Ballarat till retirement in 1892, excepting for two years when he was transferred to Melbourne to reorganise that office. One of Australia's earliest telephone and telephony experimenters in 1878. As a member of the Telegraph Electrical Society of Victoria from inception in 1874, he was a contemporary of Samuel Walker McGowan, Peter Robert Challen and Henry Sutton. Famously exposed, in parliamentary enquiry, the nepotism within Victorian Posts and Telegraphs in the 1880s.

== Honours and legacy ==
Béchervaise was first awarded the MBE and then in the New Year's Day 1993 honours list further awarded the Order of Australia Medal OAM for service to Australian Antarctic exploration.

Béchervaise Island (or 'Bech' to locals), was named on 1 January 2000 in his honour. It is the largest, central island of the Flat Islands, about 2 km WNW of Mawson Station.

Mount Béchervaise is a great massif of brown rock in the Athos Range, Prince Charles Mountains which was first visited in November 1955 by an ANARE party led by Bechervaise and named in his honour.

Béchervaise Plateau is the plateau surrounding Federation Peak which he was the first to climb with a party of schoolboys in 1949.

Many mountain climbers and bushwalkers got inspired either by his classes or by participating in his adventures to go on to their own adventures.

== Bibliography ==
Béchervaise wrote numerous articles in Walkabout, the Victorian Naturalist and elsewhere. Some of his published books are:

- 1947 – Barwon and Barrabools – Poems with Pictures. Henry Thacker: Geelong.
- 1957 – ANARE: Australia's Antarctic Outposts. OUP: Melbourne. (With Philip Law).
- 1959 – Antarctica: Australian Explorers. OUP: Melbourne.
- 1961 – The Far South. Angus & Robertson: Sydney.
- 1963 – Blizzard and Fire. A year at Mawson, Antarctica. Angus & Robertson: Sydney.
- 1967 – Australia: World of Difference. The Australian Transition. Rigby: Adelaide.
- 1967 – Australia and Antarctica. Nelson Doubleday: Sydney.
- 1968 – Australian Mountains and Rivers. Nelson Doubleday:
- 1970 – Ballarat and Western Goldfields Sketchbook. Rigby.
- 1970 – Bendigo and Eastern Goldfields Sketchbook. Rigby.
- 1971 – Blue Mountain Sketchbook. Rigby.
- 1973 – Old Melbourne Hotels Sketchbook. Rigby.
- 1975 – Grampians Sketchbook. Rigby.
- 1976 – Old Victorian Country Pubs Sketchbook. Rigby: Adelaide.
- 1976 – Wilsons Promontory. Rigby: Adelaide.
- 1977 – Ballarat sketchbook. Rigby.
- 1977 – Historic Melbourne Sketchbook. Rigby.
- 1977 – University of Melbourne Sketchbook. Rigby: Adelaide.
- 1978 – Science: Men on Ice in Antarctica. Lothian Publishing: Melbourne.
- 1979 – Antarctica. The Last Horizon. Cassell: Stanmore. (Revised and expanded edition of The Far South).
- 1979 – Castlemaine Sketchbook. Rigby.
- 1980 – Rediscovering Victoria's Goldfields. Pitman: Carlton.
- 1982 – The Bendigo Book. Bendigo Ampersand Publishing.
- 1985 – The University of Melbourne – an Illustrated Perspective. MUP: Carlton.
- 1995 – Arctic and Antarctic – the Will and the Way of John Riddoch Rymill. Bluntisham Books: UK.
