= Breaksea Islands (Tasmania) =

Island group in Tasmania, Australia

Breaksea Islands Group
- Location within Tasmania

Geography
- Location: Port Davey
- Coordinates: 43°19′12″S 145°57′36″E
- Adjacent to: Southern Ocean
- Total islands: 6
- Area: 16 ha (40 acres)

Administration
- Australia
- State: Tasmania
- Region: South West

Demographics
- Population: 0

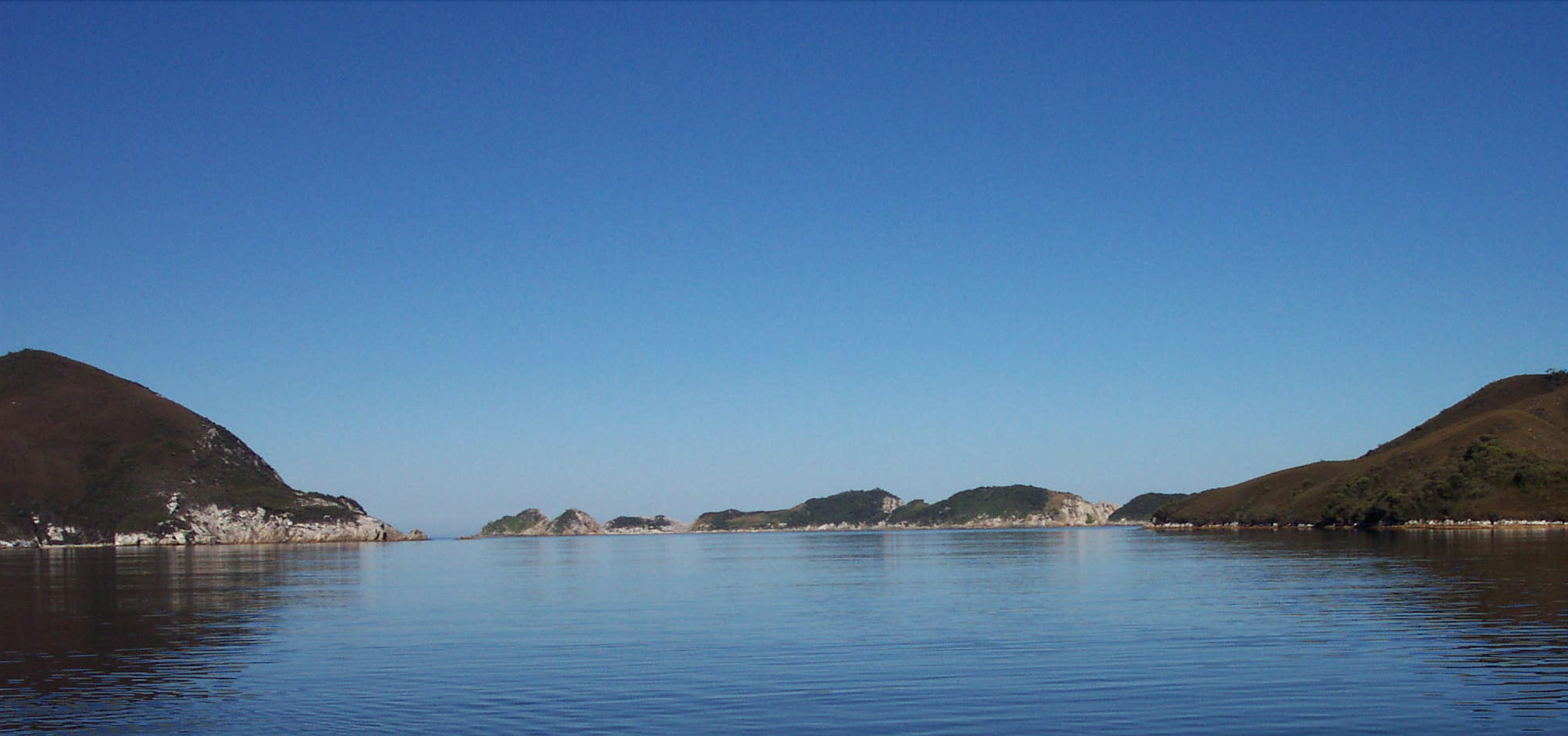
Breaksea Islands at the entrance to Bathurst Channel

The Breaksea Islands Group is a group of six islands, in the Southern Ocean, off the southwestern coast of Tasmania, Australia.

Located near the mouth of Port Davey, the group comprise the North Breaksea and Main Breaksea Islands, the Fitzroy, Kathleen, and Munday islands, and the Mavourneen Rocks. The group have a total area of approximately 16 hectares (40 acres) and are contained within the Southwest National Park, part of the Tasmanian Wilderness World Heritage Site and the Port Davey/Bathurst Harbour Marine Nature Reserve.

== Fauna ==
The islands are noted as a breeding site for many seabird species, including little penguin (400 pairs), short-tailed shearwater (3000-5000 pairs), fairy prion (20 pairs) and silver gull. The Tasmanian tree skink is present. Rabbits were introduced in the 19th century by whalers. and have caused some damage to vegetation and soil.

The islands are part of the Port Davey Islands Important Bird Area, so identified by BirdLife International because of its importance for breeding seabirds.

== See also ==
- List of islands of Tasmania
