= Arthur Range =

Mountain range in Tasmania, Australia

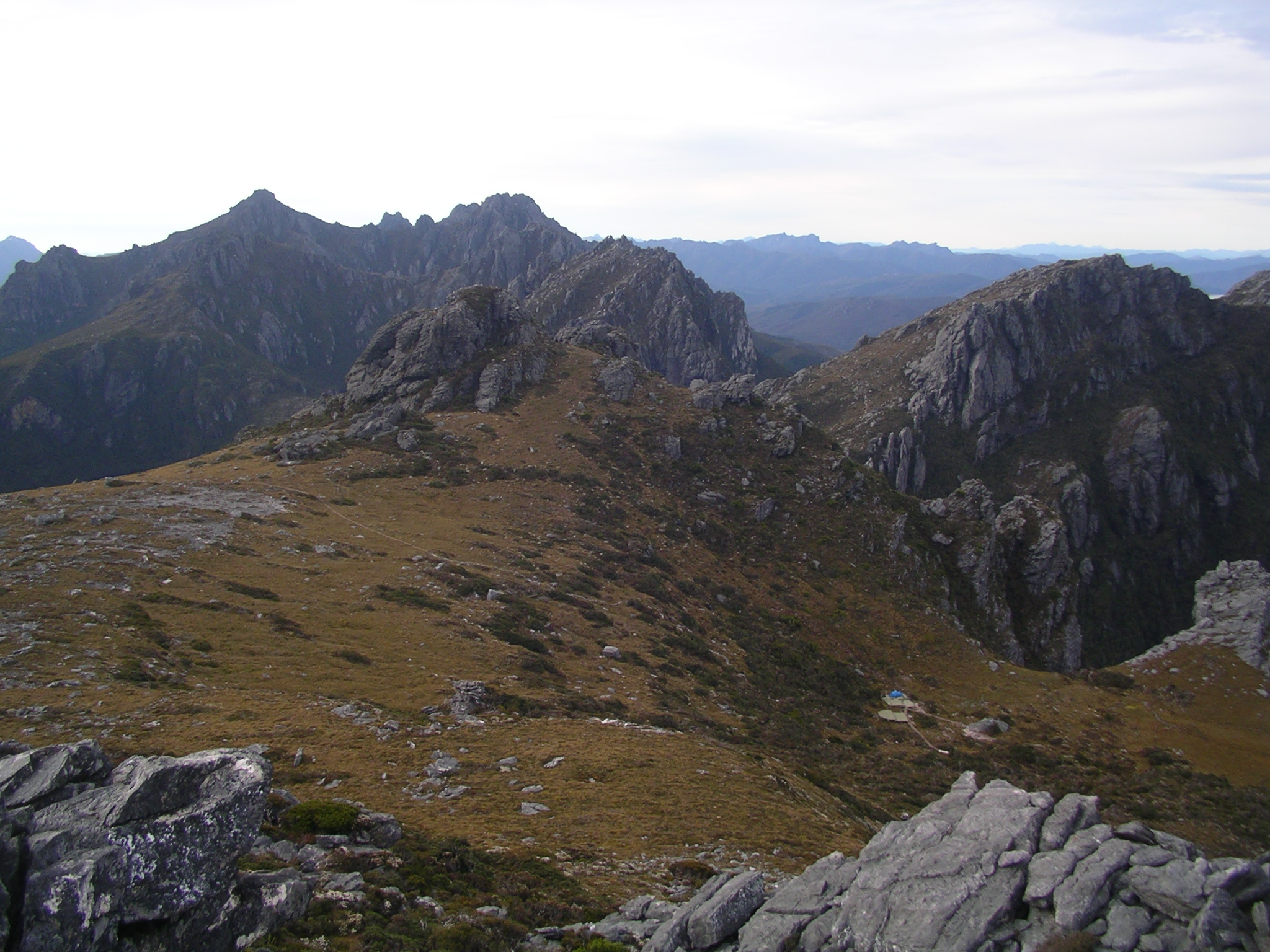
- Looking across High Moor from Mount Columba towards Mount Capricorn and Mount Pegasus

Highest point
- Elevation: 1,224 m (4,016 ft)AHD
- Parent peak: Federation Peak
- Coordinates: 43°16′17″S 146°28′32″E

Geography
- Location within Tasmania
- Country: Australia
- State: Tasmania
- Region: South West
- Range coordinates: 43°12′S 146°25′E

The Arthur Range is a mountain range in the South West Wilderness, in south-west Tasmania, Australia. The range is broken into two main sections, the Western Arthurs and the Eastern Arthurs. Both sections of the range are popular overnight bushwalking destinations, generally in summer.

== History ==
The Arthur Range lies in the traditional country of the South-West Nation of the Aboriginal Tasmanian people and the traditional name is Loinnekumme (LOINNE.KUM.ME). The range was renamed by George Augustus Robinson for Governor George Arthur after Robinson climbed Mount Frederick (now Mount Hayes) in March 1830.

In December 2018, a Par Avion plane being piloted by Nikita Williams crashed into the ranges. There was poor visibility at the time.

== Geology ==
It is mainly composed of Quartzite and features evidence of past glaciation such as moraines and hanging valleys.

== Flora and fauna ==
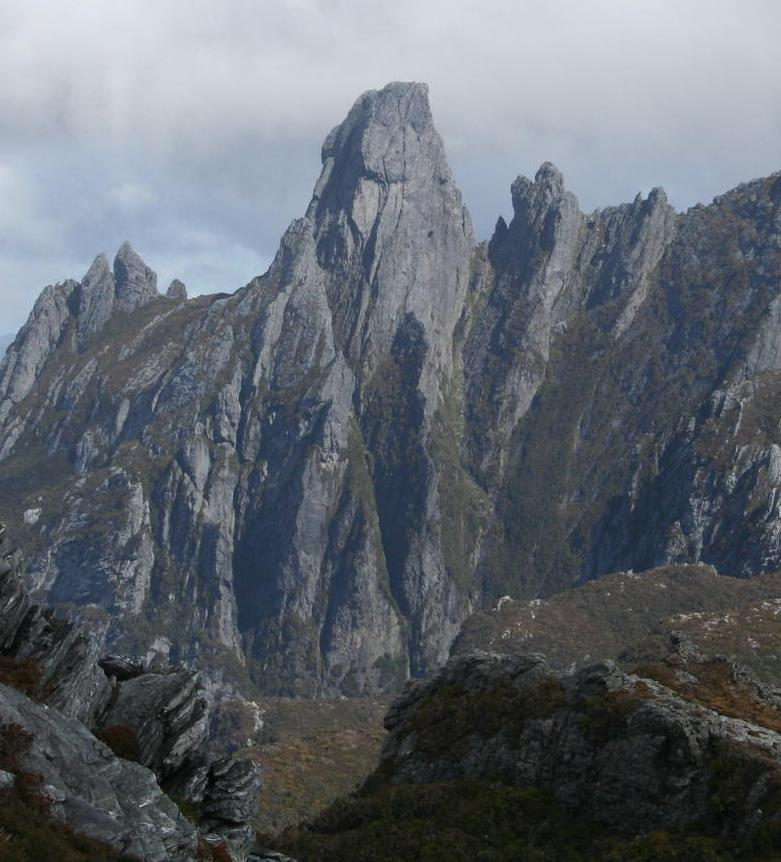
Federation Peak within the Eastern Arthur Range

Much of the Arthur Range and the area surrounding land is covered by button grass wet sedgelands. Most of the remainder of the land is covered by eucalypt.

Birds are the most common animals (e.g. yellow-tailed black cockatoos). In dryer areas, Pademelons may also be seen.

== Climate ==
The climate in the Arthur Range is extremely unstable – weather predictions are virtually useless here, as it is very common to have sun, heavy rain, cloud, strong winds, even snow all in the same day. The top of the range is classed as Sub-Alpine or Alpine. During winter these mountains are snow-capped. Snow has been experienced every season, with regular snowfalls during summer, though many of these snowfalls don't settle. The climate is mostly decided by the wind. The temperature can change very quickly with warm air from Northern Tasmania, or very cold air from the Southern Ocean and Antarctica.

== Walking ==
As with other parts of Tasmania's south-west, the trails are extremely muddy – very frequently it is more than ankle deep. The mud does not dissipate with altitude up the mountain range either, except where there is bare rock.

Like many other parts of Tasmania, this area is susceptible to Phytophthora (root rot). To avoid spreading it, walkers are encouraged to stay to the main trail. In order to reduce mechanical damage to plants, walkers are also encouraged to wade through the middle of muddy track sections.

Hikers should ensure they are well prepared for any weather conditions, and have enough food for one or two extra days.

== Western Arthurs ==
The Western Arthurs extends generally East-West from Mount Hesperus to West Portal. This section of the range was first traversed by Europeans in the early 1960s.

Access to the Western Arthurs is usually from the Scotts peak dam camp site (43°02′15″S 146°17′52″E) via part of the Port Davey Track.

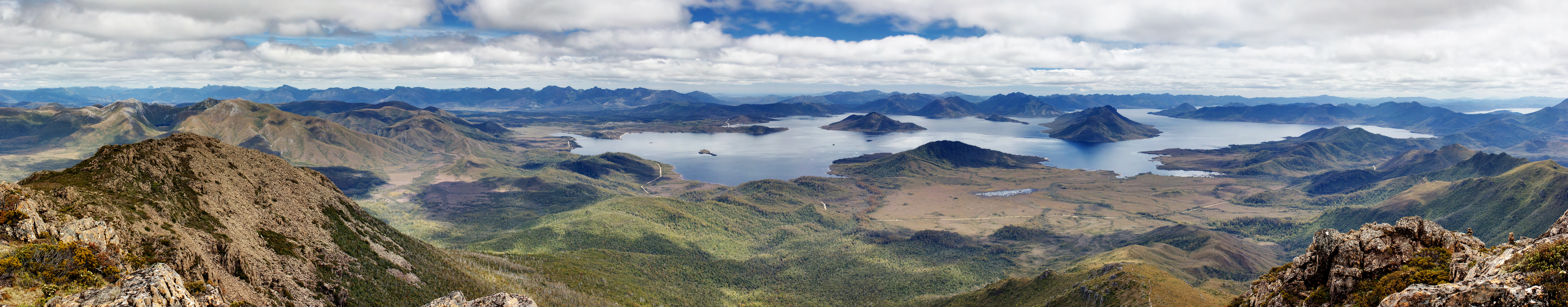
The Western Arthur range can be seen on the left hand side

=== Lakes ===
The Western Arthurs are studded with many lakes formed from ice-age glaciers. Among these are:

- Lake Oberon (43°08′55″S 146°16′20″E): The subject of a well known photograph by Peter Dombrovskis, and where there are camping platforms
- Lake Cygnus (43°07′49″S 146°14′16″E): Also has an established camp site
- Lake Ceres (43°08′29″S 146°15′11″E)
- Square Lake (43°08′29″S 146°15′46″E)
- Lake Fortuna (43°07′31″S 146°13′39″E)

=== Mountains ===
From the north western end, closest to the Port Davey Track:

- Mount Hesperus (1099m)
- Mount Hayes (1119m)
- Procyon Peak (1136m)
- Mount Sirius (1151m)
- Mount Pegasus (1063m)
- Pegasus South (1053m)
- Mount Capricorn (1037m)
- Dorado Peak (1068m)
- Mount Comumba (1042m)
- The Dragon (1006m)
- Mount Shaula (914m)
- Mount Taurus (1011m)

== Eastern Arthurs ==
The Eastern Arthurs runs North-South from the end of the Western Arthurs and includes the highest peak of the range, the striking Federation Peak. This section of the range was first traversed in December 1947 by a group from the Hobart Walking Club.

=== Lakes ===
From the north include:

- Lake Leo
- Lake Ron Smith
- Lake Shaw
- Earl Lake
- Lake Cracroft
- Lake Brewsher
- Dragonfly Lake
- Lake Payens
- Lake Gaston
- Hanging Lake

=== Mountains ===
From the north:

- Cerberus Hill (541m)
- East Portal (1008m)
- The Dial (1083m)
- The Gables (1058m)
- Four Peaks (1062m)
- Federation Peak (1225m)
- Geeves Bluff (1152m)

=== Named features ===
- Luckmans lead
- Boiler Plates
- Stuart Saddle
- The Needles
- Goon Moor
- Thwaites Plateau
- Devils Thumb
- Bechervaise plateau

== See also ==
- List of mountains in Australia § Tasmania
