= South Coast Tasmania =

Coastal area in Tasmania, Australia

South Coast Tasmania runs from the South East Cape to the South West Cape of Tasmania. South Coast Tasmania is sometimes conflated with the South West Tasmania wilderness region.

The significant features between South West Cape and South East Cape include:-

Cox Bight

Louisa Bay

New River Lagoon

South Cape

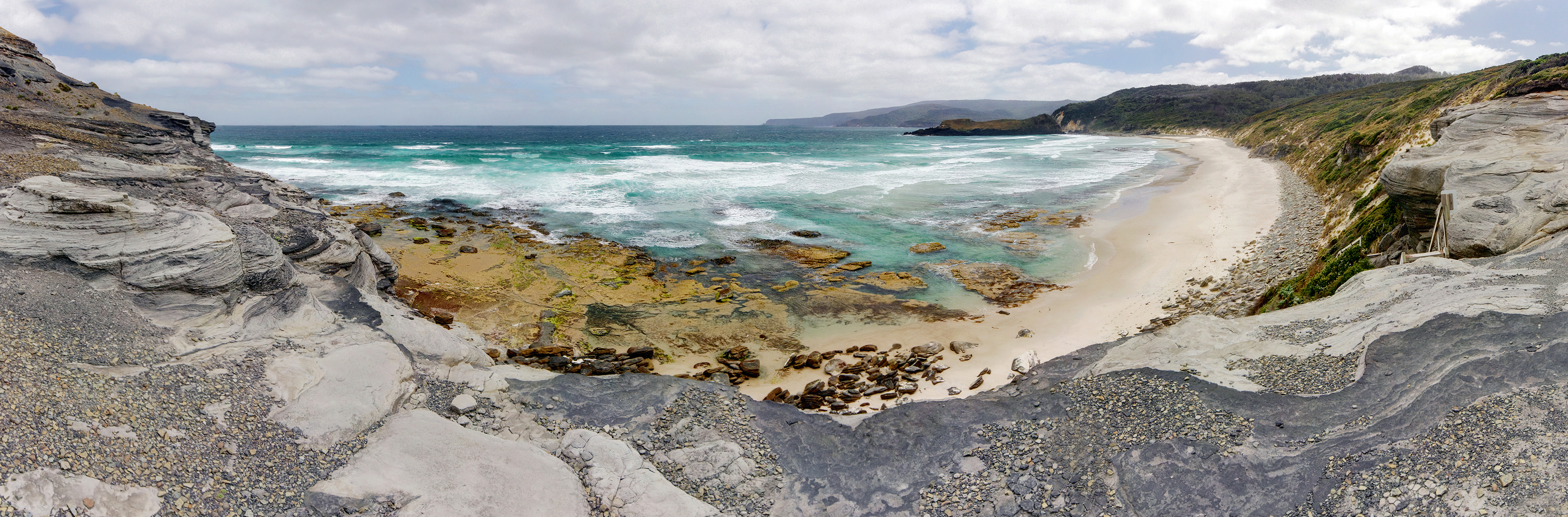
South Cape Bay, Tasmania, South Cape on the right.

== See also ==
- South Coast Track

== Map ==
- (1997) South coast walks [cartographic material] : track coverage Moonlight Ridge Wilson Bight, Scotts Peak - Melaleuca - Cockle Creek [Tasmania] Land Information Services, Department of Environment and Land Management, in co-operation with Parks and Wildlife Service Hobart : The department. (Maps show walking tracks in Southwest National Park, and environs. Relief shown by contours, hill shading and spot heights. Includes track descriptions and tourist information. Panel title. Includes locality map indexing 1:100 000 and 1:25 000 topographic map sheets).
