= South Coast Track =

Hiking trail in Southwest National Park, Tasmania, Australia

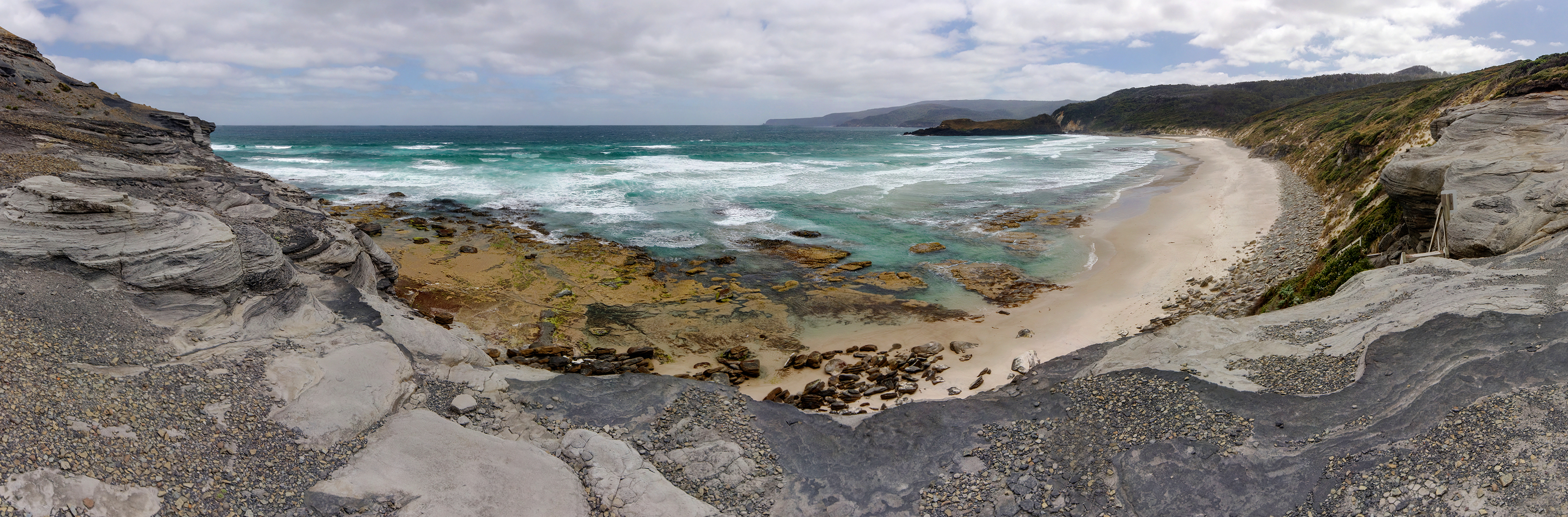
- The footprints in the sand and the cliff in the foreground mark a small section of the South Coast track at South Cape Bay.
- Length: 85 kilometres (53 mi)
- Location: South Coast Tasmania, Australia
- Designation: Tasmanian Wilderness World Heritage Site
- Trailheads: Cockle Creek (east); Melaleuca (west)
- Use: Hiking
- Website: https://parks.tas.gov.au/explore-our-parks/southwest-national-park/south-coast-track

The South Coast Track is a bushwalking track located in the South Coast region of Tasmania, Australia. The 85-kilometre (53 mi) track traverses remote wilderness within the Southwest National Park, part of the Tasmanian Wilderness World Heritage Site, and is managed as a wilderness walk. The Tasmanian Parks & Wildlife Service recommend that experienced bushwalkers can take six-to-eight days to cover the track in one direction.

The track follows the wild southern coastline of Tasmania. It crosses two mountain ranges to avoid sections of impassable coastline and also crosses long sections of open plains behind the coastline. It only follows the coast itself where there are beaches. The track may be combined with the Port Davey Track as a long continuous trek requiring around eight to fourteen days.

== Features and location ==
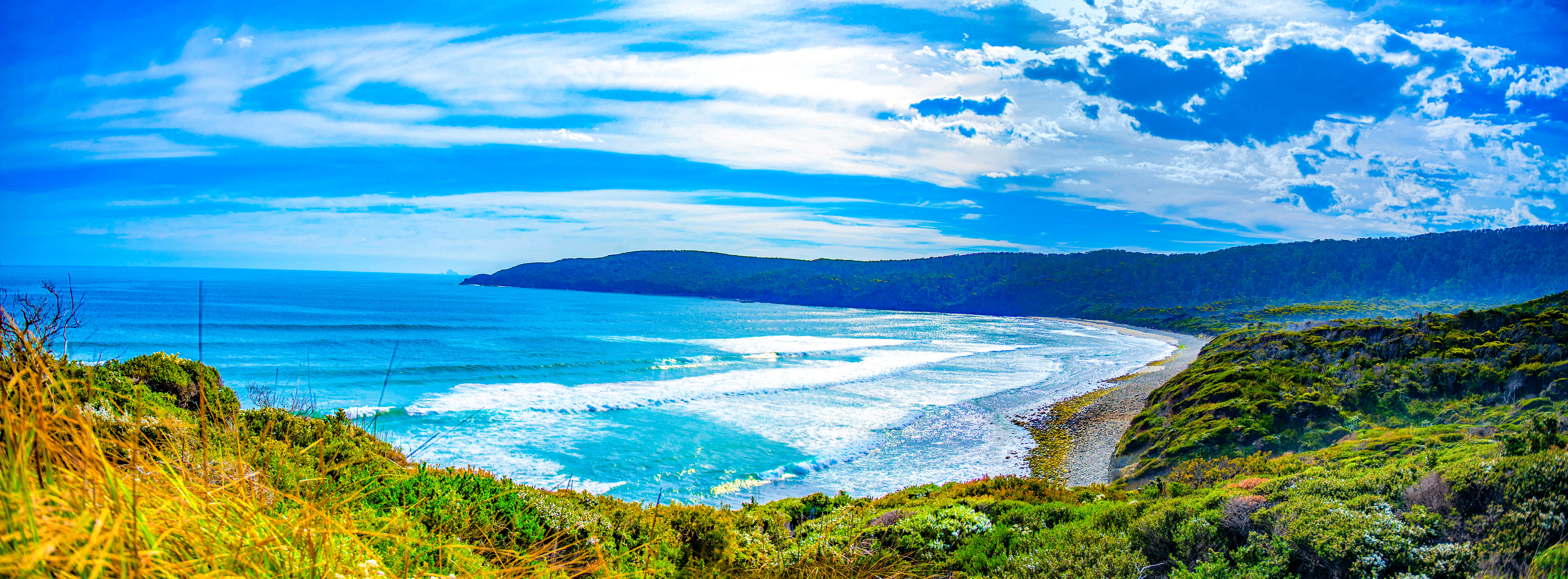
Granite Beach, South Coast Track

From the isolated locality of Melaleuca in the west, the track trailhead is located where the track adjoins the southern terminus of the South Coast Track at the Melaleuca Visitor Services Site of the Parks & Wildlife Service (43°25′08″S 146°09′25″E). From this point the track heads south towards Cox Bight, and then east to the Louisa River. Continuing east and after crossing the Ironbound Range, the track reaches Deadmans Bay and then to Prion Beach, requiring a boat crossing of a narrow ocean inlet. Continuing further east by south, the track reaches Granite Beach and then South Cape Rivulet within South Cape Bay. From this point, the track heads east by north to Cockle Creek where it reaches its eastern terminus (42°43′S 147°56′E).

Most walkers fly into Melaleuca and walk out to avoid being trapped there without food in poor weather.

== See also ==
- List of bushwalking tracks of Tasmania
