= Federation Peak =

Mountain in Tasmania, Australia

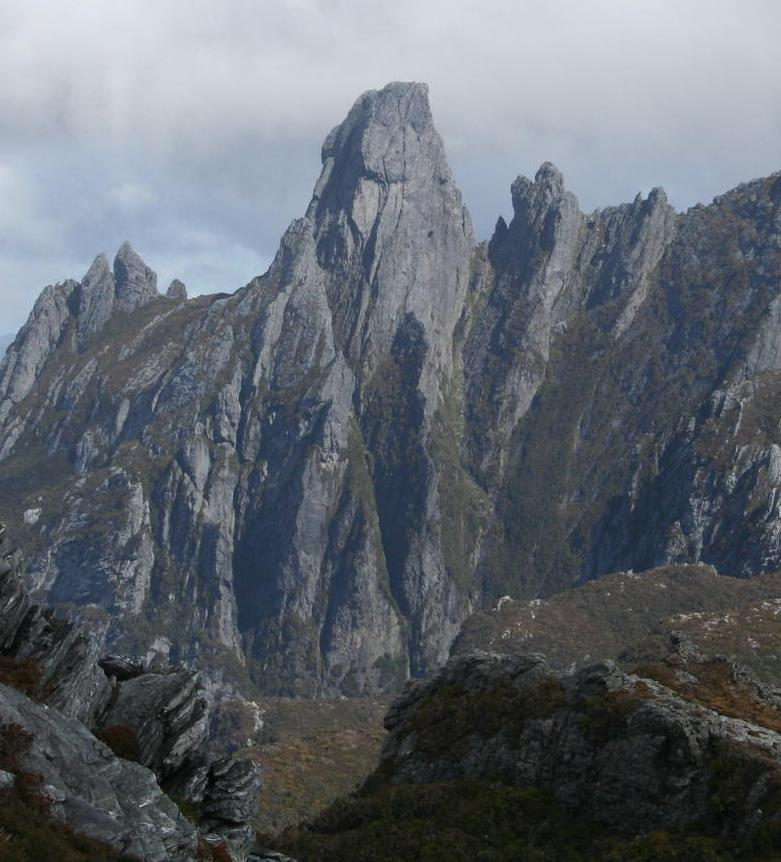
- Federation Peak from the Eastern Arthur Range

Highest point
- Elevation: 1,224 m (4,016 ft)
- Prominence: 600 m (2,000 ft)
- Coordinates: 43°16′17″S 146°28′32″E

Geography
- Location within Tasmania
- Location: Tasmania, Australia
- Parent range: Arthur Range

Climbing
- First ascent: John Béchervaise, William ( Bill ) Elliott, Frederick ( Fred ) Elliott and Allan Rogers - 27 January 1949

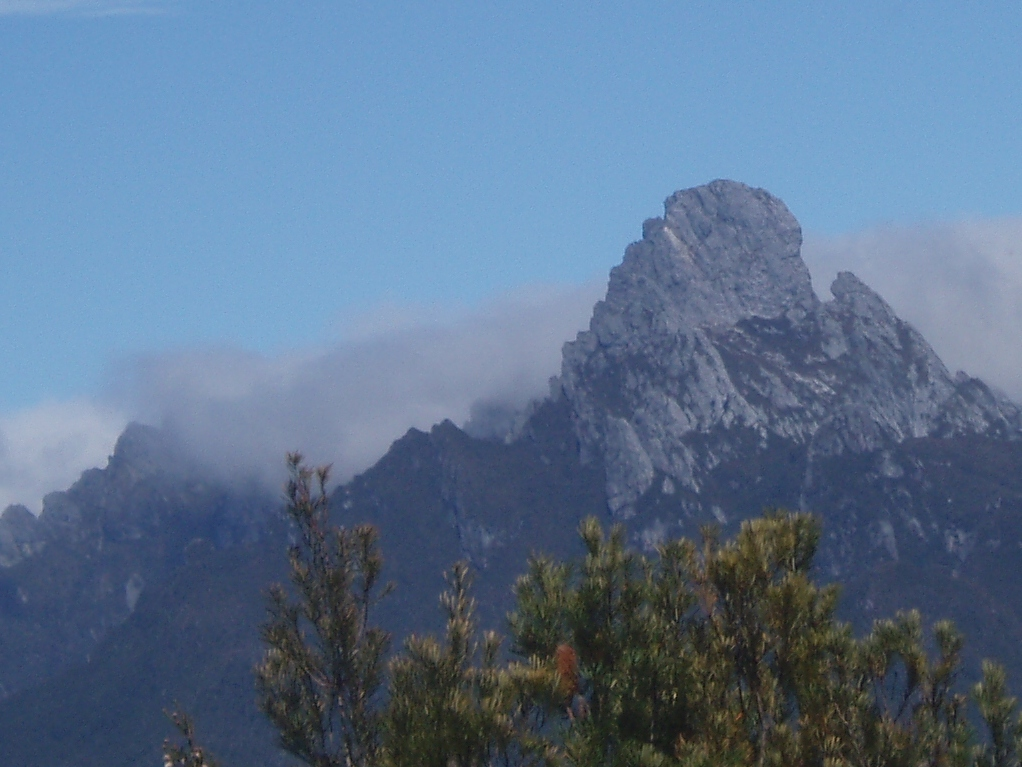
Federation Peak from a distance on the Farmhouse Creek route

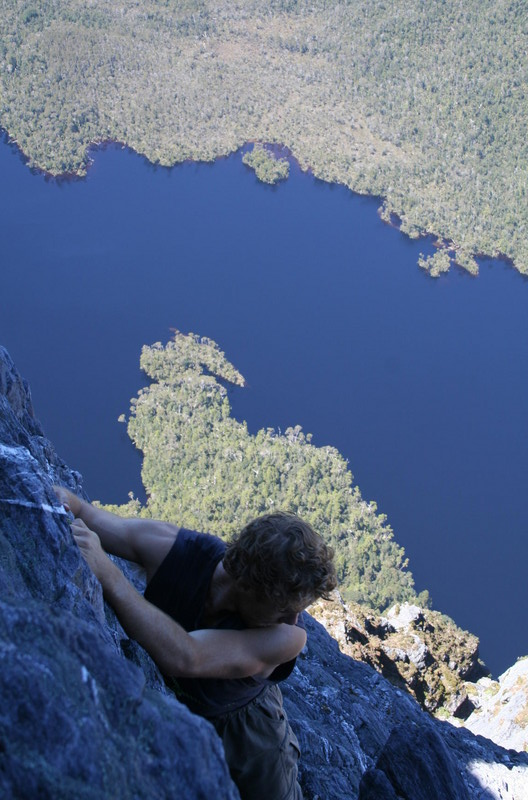
The Direct Ascent of Federation Peak, Lake Geeves is in the background

Federation Peak is a Tasmanian mountain with a sharp spire-like shape, which marks the southern end of the Eastern Arthur Range in the Southwest National Park. The peak, approximately 90 kilometres (56 mi) south-west from Hobart, was named after the Federation of Australia.

With an elevation of 1,224 metres (4,016 ft) above sea level the last stretch of the route up is extremely steep and exposed, involving rock climbing moves 600 metres (2,000 ft) above Lake Geeves. Its reputation is such that Sir Edmund Hillary declared it "Australia's only real mountain".

== History ==
The first westerner to sight the peak was the surveyor James Sprent who was carrying out a trigonometrical survey of Tasmania. He described it as "the Obelisk". It became known as Sprent's Obelisk, however in 1901 it was officially named Federation Peak in honour of the Federation of Australia by Thomas Bather Moore while cutting a track from Hastings to Port Davey via Old River.

It took almost 50 years after the first western sighting for the summit to be reached, a testament to the harshness of southwest Tasmania. Challenges include thick horizontal scrub, ancient cool temperate rainforest, exceptionally steep and harsh terrain on the surrounding ridges and highly unpredictable weather generated by the roaring forties.

After several unsuccessful attempts by various groups in the late 1940s, a party from the Geelong College Exploration Society led by John Béchervaise reached the summit on the 27 January 1949.

The exposed and technical nature of the usual route that is usually climbed unroped has resulted in a number of fatalities; most recently in November 2025.

=== Notable accidents ===
2007
Tasmanian Michael Skirka, 38, fell to his death in April 2007.

2016
Tasmanian Melissa Fisher, 32, fell to her death in March 2016.
Statement from Inspector Riley: "It appears over the last 10 years we've done approximately 20 recoveries around Federation Peak and there have been six deaths."

2024
A 27 year man from New Zealand, living in Victoria, fell to his death in July 2024.
A Victorian man in his 30s fell to his death in December 2024.

2025
A 39 year old man fell to his death in November 2025.

== Climate ==
The highest elevations of the mountain experience alpine conditions with most of the weather patterns determined by the wind. The mountain receives large amounts of snow in autumn, winter and early spring, with the summit area frequently layered in ice. Unseasonal snowfalls can be seen in summer though many of them don't settle.

== Climbing routes ==
There are a number of graded rockclimbing routes to the summit, most notably Blade Ridge (grade 18), which is a steep knife edge ridge rising out of the cool temperate forest at the foot of the mountain. The ridge joins the main face of the peak a few hundred metres beneath the summit. The climb from the end of the ridge is then up an exposed but well-protected face to the summit, some 600 metres (2,000 ft) above the valley floor. Blade Ridge was first successfully used as a route up Federation Peak in February 1968, by Peter Heddles, Rod Harris, David Neilson and Jack Woods

Most bushwalkers with minimal or no climbing gear take the exposed 'Direct Ascent' scramble from the Southern Traverse of the peak above a drop of 600 metres (2,000 ft) into Lake Geeves (approximately Australian climbing grade 5).

Access to the base of the peak is generally from Geeveston via Farmhouse Creek and Moss Ridge or Scotts Peak via the Eastern Arthurs. The first route is the shorter of two - generally three days to the peak. The Eastern Arthurs via Scotts Peak Dam takes at least 7 days finishing at Farmhouse Creek; up to 10 days with bad weather.

== Winter ascents ==
The first ascent under true winter conditions was made by Faye Kerr and Max Cutcliffe in September 1954, while a Tasmanian group led by Kevin Doran climbed the Mountain in severe weather over two weeks in August 1978, a trip which cost Doran a toe from cold injuries.

The first, and only, winter ascent of Blade Ridge (a steep sharp ridge on the northern face) was made in 2016 by Mick Wright and Mark Savage, on an expedition led by Andy Szollosi. Their journey is featured in the documentary Winter on the Blade.

== See also ==
- List of highest mountains of Tasmania
