= Bathurst Channel =

Channel in south west Tasmania

- Location on the south west coast of Tasmania
- Location: South Western Tasmania
- Coordinates: 43°20′24″S 146°01′12″E
- Type: Channel
- Etymology: 3rd Earl Bathurst, Secretary of State for War and the Colonies
- Part of: Port Davey/Bathurst Harbour Marine Nature Reserve
- Primary inflows: Bathurst Harbour
- Primary outflows: Port Davey
- Basin countries: Australia

The Bathurst Channel is a narrow offshore stretch of water that links Port Davey with Bathurst Harbour in the South West region of Tasmania, Australia. The Bathurst Channel is contained within the Port Davey/Bathurst Harbour Marine Nature Reserve, and the Southwest National Park, part of the Tasmanian Wilderness World Heritage Area.

== Features and location ==
The channel has been studied for estuarine and introduced marine species.

The channel's water is stained red and provides a low light; this allows deeper-water creatures to live in the shallow water. The water is pitch black 6 metres (20 ft) below the surface. The channel attracts researchers and divers because they can observe deep underwater life without travelling thousands of feet with expensive equipment.
