= Melaleuca, Tasmania =

Former settlement in Tasmania, Australia

Melaleuca Tasmania
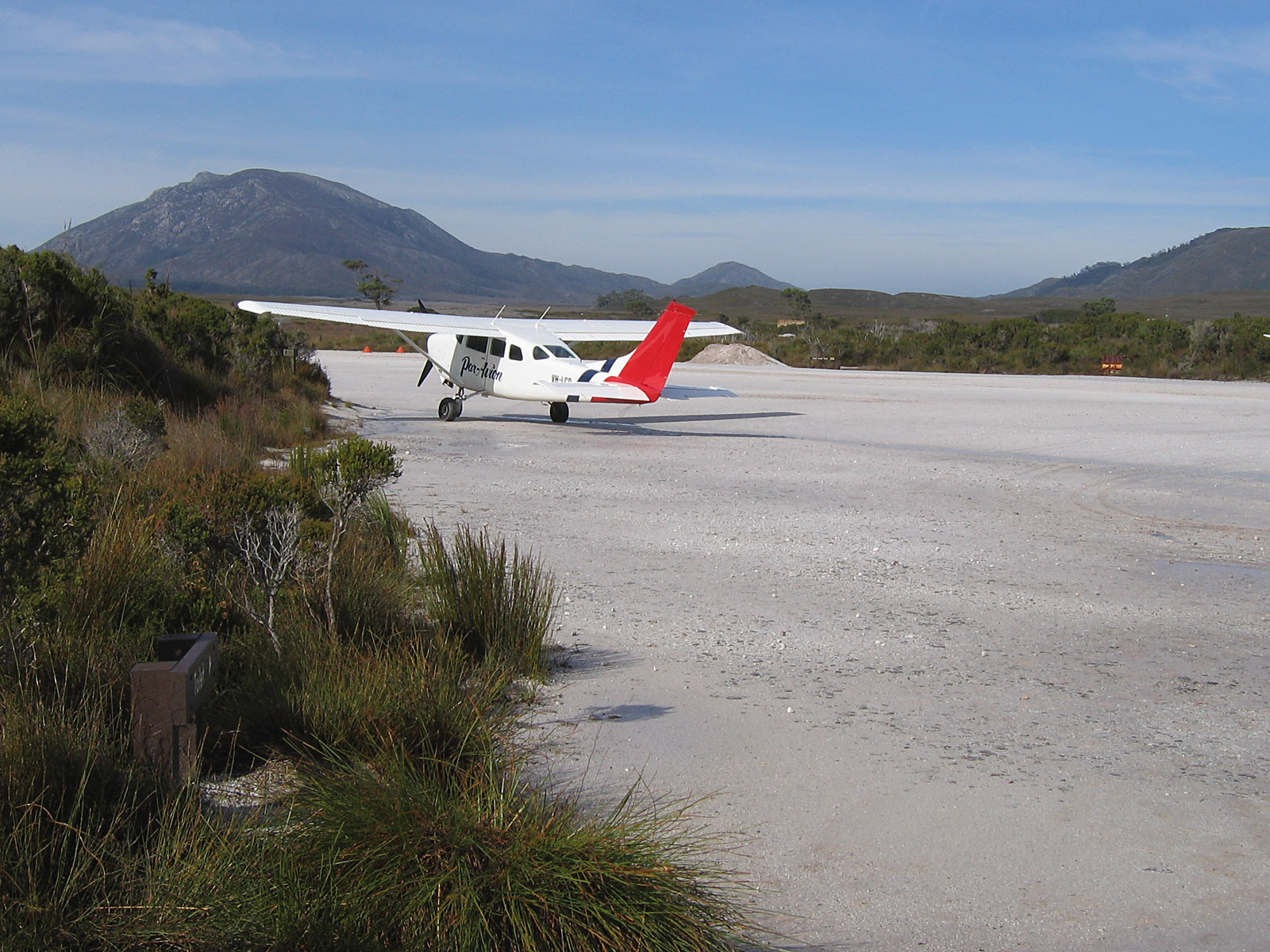
- A tourist plane prepares for take-off from Melaleuca.

- Coordinates: 43°25′19.2″S 146°9′46.8″E
- Population: 0 (?)
- Postcode(s): none
- LGA(s): Huon Valley Council
- State electorate(s): Franklin
- Federal division(s): Franklin

Melaleuca is a remote locality (former settlement) in the south-west area of Tasmania, Australia.

Access is only by sea via Port Davey, by air or by foot.

The locality now consists of a couple of buildings and a bird hide where the orange-bellied parrot can be viewed, and is a tourist attraction. Melaleuca has a gravel airstrip, which is used by small aircraft, which service hiking needs and which bring tourists to the remote South West Wilderness region of the state. Two hiking trails meet at Melaleuca: the Port Davey Track and the South Coast Track.

From the 1930s until the area gained World Heritage status, Melaleuca had been the location leased for mining ventures.

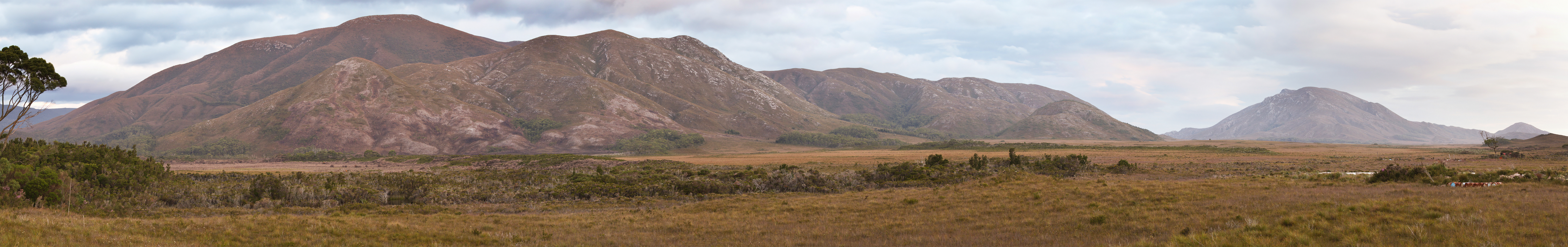
Looking west from Melaleuca to the Bathurst Range

== Deny King ==
From 1936 until his death in 1991, Melaleuca was home to tin miner Deny King who discovered the extinct shrub, Banksia kingii as well as a species of eyebright, Euphrasia kingii and the endangered King's lomatia or King's holly, Lomatia tasmanica. King also built the walkers' accommodation and airstrip and in 1975 was made a Member of the Order of Australia for his services to the community.

== Climate ==
Climate data for Melaleuca, Port Davey (6 m AMSL; BOM 1946-1999)
Month	Jan	Feb	Mar	Apr	May	Jun	Jul	Aug	Sep	Oct	Nov	Dec	Year
Mean daily maximum °C (°F)	19.2 (66.6)	19.0 (66.2)	17.8 (64.0)	15.5 (59.9)	13.1 (55.6)	11.8 (53.2)	11.7 (53.1)	12.0 (53.6)	13.9 (57.0)	15.2 (59.4)	16.3 (61.3)	19.2 (66.6)	15.4 (59.7)
Mean daily minimum °C (°F)	9.6 (49.3)	9.5 (49.1)	8.7 (47.7)	7.7 (45.9)	6.1 (43.0)	3.9 (39.0)	3.9 (39.0)	4.6 (40.3)	5.7 (42.3)	6.2 (43.2)	7.3 (45.1)	8.6 (47.5)	6.8 (44.2)
Average rainfall mm (inches)	135.2 (5.32)	114.6 (4.51)	151.5 (5.96)	207.7 (8.18)	234.2 (9.22)	217.5 (8.56)	238.8 (9.40)	235.7 (9.28)	200.2 (7.88)	194.6 (7.66)	154.9 (6.10)	162.3 (6.39)	2,142.5 (84.35)
Average rainy days (≥ 0.2 mm)	17.1	14.1	17.3	20.4	21.9	20.4	22.2	23.0	21.4	22.2	19.6	18.2	237.8
