= Lune River, Tasmania =

Lune River
- Town
- Coordinates: 43°25′26″S 146°54′28″E
- Country: Australia
- State: Tasmania
- LGA: Huon Valley Council

Government
  - State electorate: Franklin
  - Federal division: Franklin

Population
  - Total: 38 (SAL 2021)
- Time zone: UTC+10 (AEST)
  - Summer (DST): UTC+11 (AEDT)
- Postcode: 7109

Lune River is a town in south-eastern Tasmania, Australia located near the mouth of a river of the same name. It is home to some 24 people.

In the 1850s, much of the town's economic activity was based on timber mills, fishing and small-scale farming.

The Lune River area is noted for its fossils and semi-precious stones, particularly those from the Jurassic period. According to Mineral Resources Tasmania, these fossils include petrified fern, agate, petrified wood and jasper. They report that it is one of the only sources of petrified fern in Tasmania.

The Lune River township is the departure point for the Ida Bay Railway.

== Geology ==
A Jurassic forest was buried in an andesitic volcanic eruption at Lune River. Here, beneath the lava flow, is mudstone with fossil wood and leaves. This example of nature's artwork is best displayed by cutting and polishing the fossil. T It is also the only known locality where the Jurassic magmas reached the surface to form volcanoes; elsewhere, they crystallised at depth to form the large masses of dolerite that can be seen throughout much of Tasmania.
