= Cockle Creek (Tasmania) =

Location in Tasmania, Australia

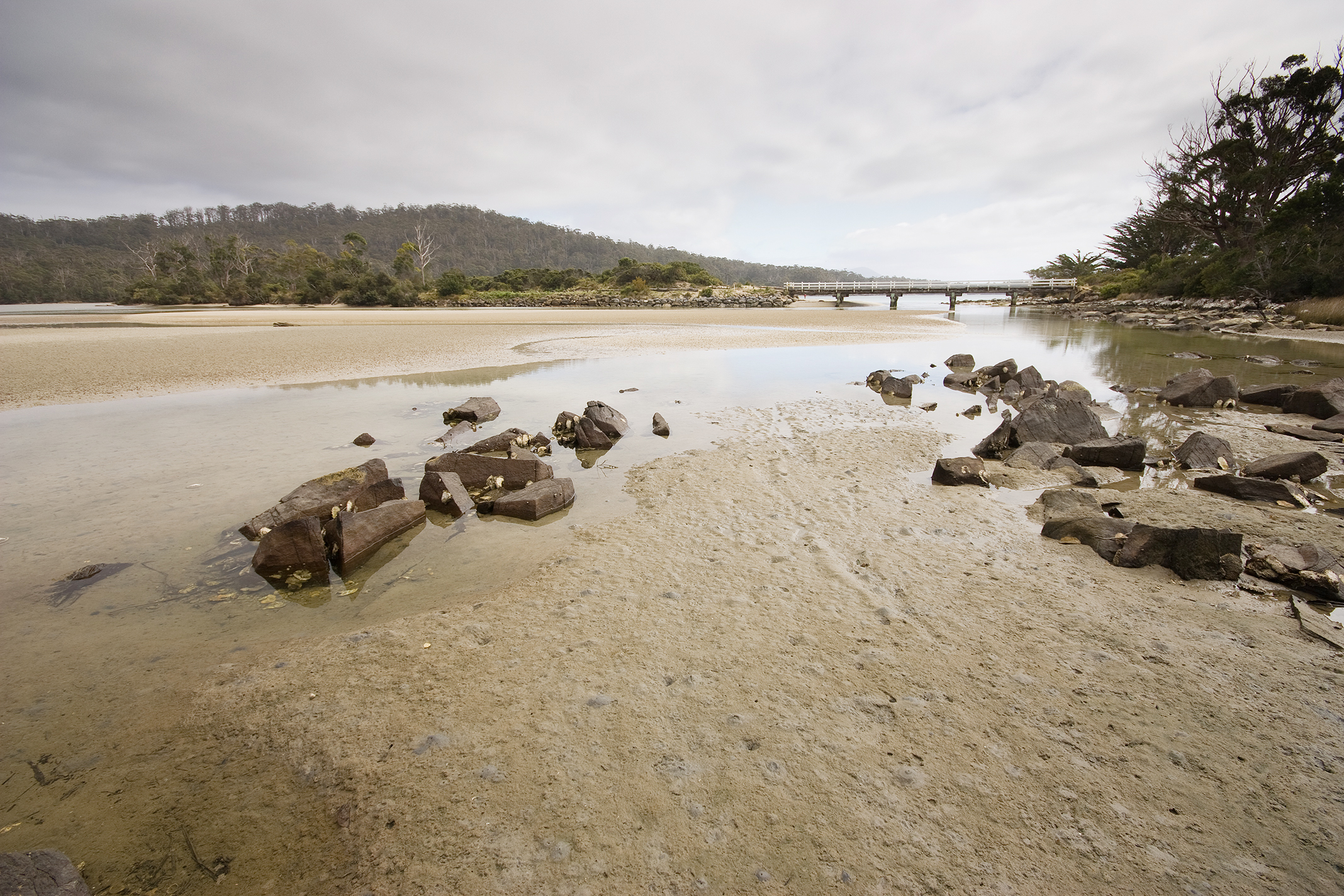

- Coordinates: 43°34′55″S 146°53′25″E
- Country: Australia
- State: Tasmania
- LGA: Huon Valley Council
- Location: 148 km (92 mi) SSW of Hobart

Government
  - State electorate: Franklin
  - Federal division: Franklin

Cockle Creek is the farthest point south one can drive in Australia. It is located on Recherche Bay on the edge of the Southwest National Park, part of the Tasmanian Wilderness World Heritage Area.

There are no shops or other facilities in the settlement, but a campground is located in the National Park with public toilets and a public phone. The National Park Ranger's office is only staffed intermittently. Main activities are camping, fishing, birdwatching and bushwalking.

Arts Tasmania with the Tasmania Parks and Wildlife Service offers an artists residency program at Cockle Creek "for an individual or collaboration of practising artists working in any art form to develop their work in response to the natural environment of Tasmania."

== Bushwalking ==
The area is known for its scenic beauty of deserted white beaches and turquoise waters of Recherche Bay and a variety of short and multi-day bushwalks including the end of the 82 km South Coast Track, recommended for experienced bushwalkers equipped for wilderness walking. Bushwalkers may enjoy a range of vegetation types occurring together in a mosaic including tea tree scrub, dry sclerophyll forest, healthland, tall wet eucalypt forest, and Eucalyptus nitida woodland.

A bronze sculpture of an infant southern right whale and interpretive sign on a small promontory a 5-minute walk from the car park explains the area's history of settlement around bay whaling, timber getting and coal mining. Longer walks include to the Fishers Point Navigation Light and ruins of the Pilot Station and a track to South East Cape for cliff-top views of the Southern Ocean and Maatsuyker Island.

== History ==
Tasmanian Indigenous People valued this region for the seals, shellfish and bush hunting it provided during the warmer months, with evidence of many shell middens in the area.

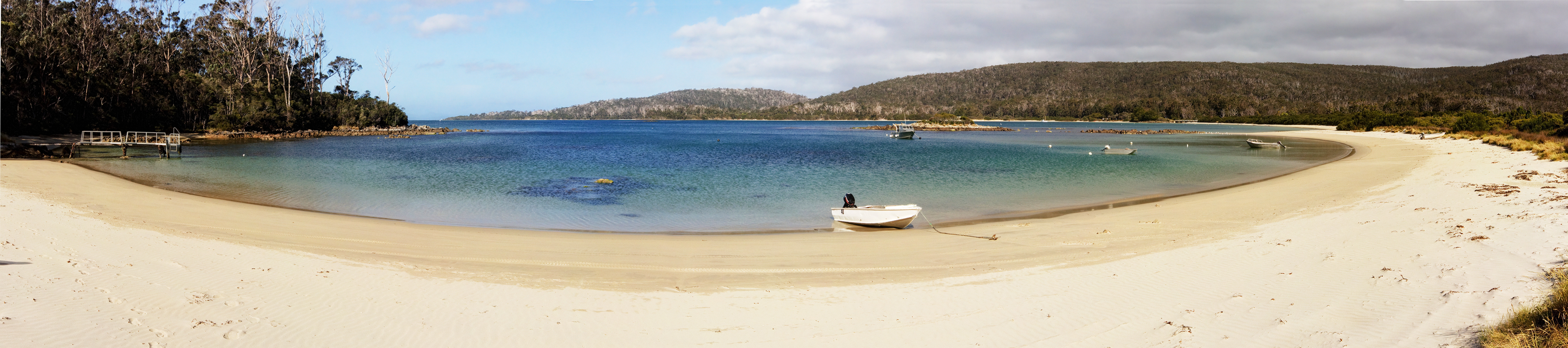
The beach at Cockle Creek

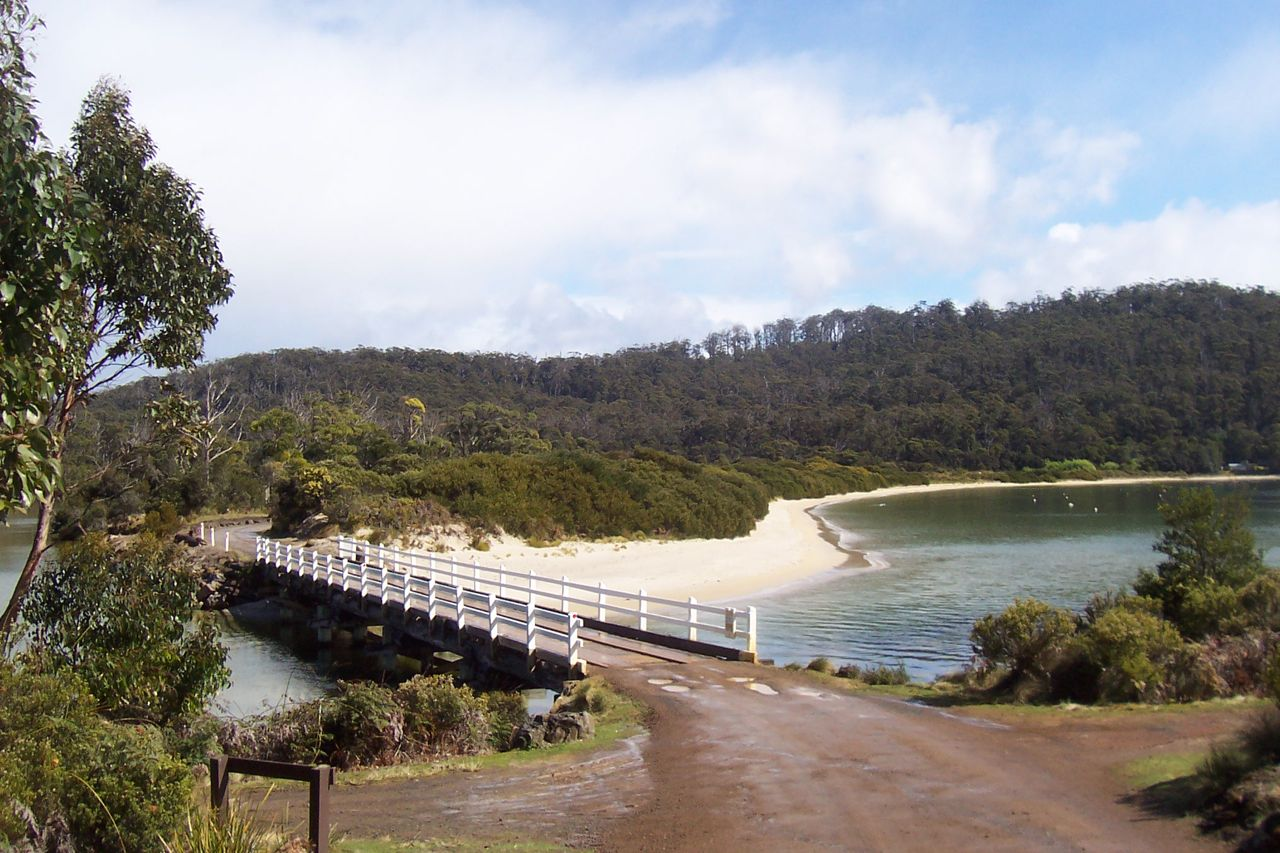
Sea inlet in Cockle Creek

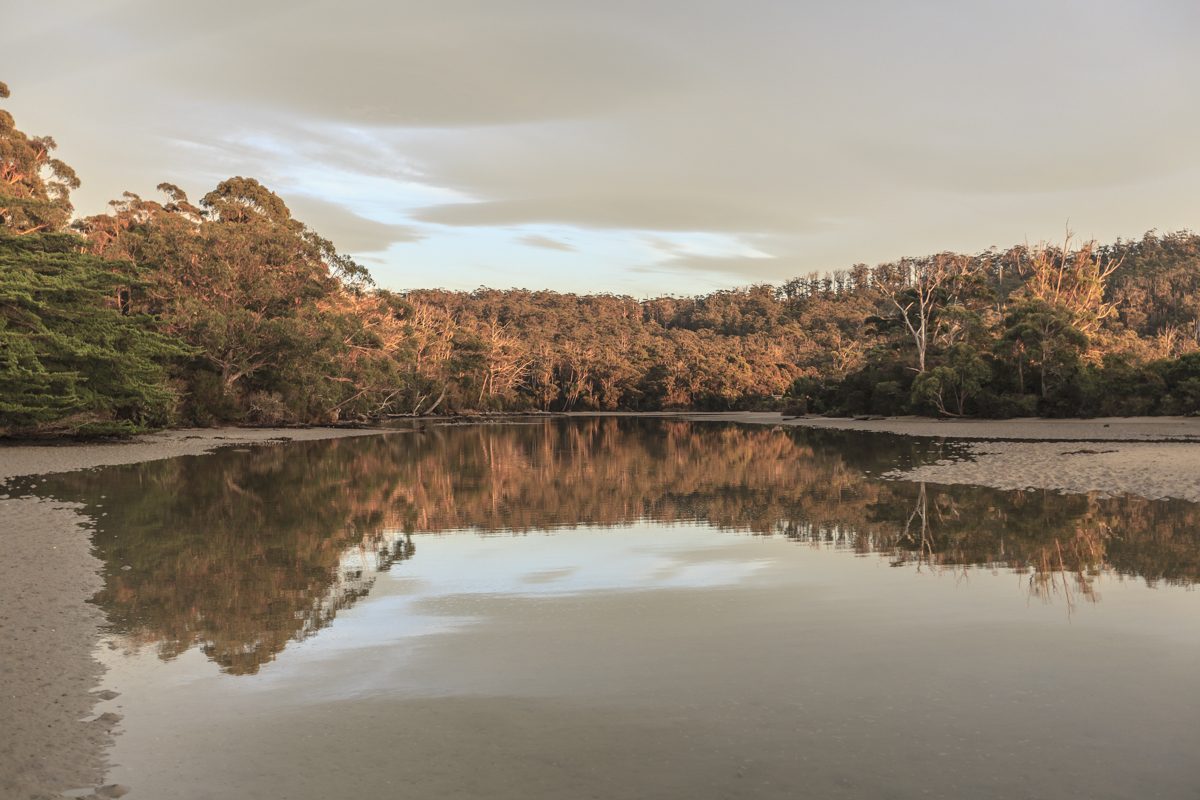
Sunrise at Cockle Creek

French explorer, Bruni D'Entrecasteaux sailed his two ships, the Recherche and Esperance, into Recherche Bay in 1792 and again in 1793 on a scientific and botanical expedition. He subsequently named the bay after one of his ships. In 2003 the remains of a garden planted by the French were found and a reserve was created to protect the area, and subsequent archeological sites associated with the expedition have also been located.

The region provided an important port of call for ships transporting convicts to the Sarah Island Penal Colony in Macquarie Harbour on the West coast of Tasmania from 1822 to 1834, when sealers, whalers and loggers visited the area and settled to extract Huon pine, or conduct bay whaling in Recherche Bay. During the 1830s there were four whaling stations at Cockle Creek. In 1836 a pilot station was set up on Fisher's Point, the southern headland to Recherche Bay, but was abandoned by 1851. During the 1840s the Crown granted seven leases for the establishment of bay whaling stations in Recherche Bay. But whales had been hunted with pregnant cows and calves indiscriminately slaughtered. Sperm whales and southern right whales were the main species hunted. By the 1850s bay whaling was in fast decline with the decimation of breeding whale populations using the bay to calve and the advent of deep sea whaling.

The settlement numbered more than 2000 people at its peak with surveying for a town called Ramsgate in an advanced stage. As whaling started to decline, timber-getting became an important activity with wooden tramways transporting logs to sawmills at Cockle Creek, Catamaran and Leprena. But gradually the good timber became less accessible and coal was discovered enabling the tramways to transport coal for export by ship at Evoralls Point, just north of Cockle Creek. Eventually the coal seam dwindled, causing people to drift away.

== Ecotourism development controversy ==
In 2004 Melbourne property developer David Marriner proposed building a $15 million eco-tourist complex at Cockle Creek East at Planter Beach within the National Park but outside the World Heritage Area which provoked some controversy. As a result of protests, the developer decided in December 2006 to pursue approval for construction of the main lodge building and carpark development on private land adjoining the National Park.

A development of a new site plan for Cockle Creek and Recherche Bay, and the still proposed resort at Planter Beach, Cockle Creek East, was announced in March 2008.
