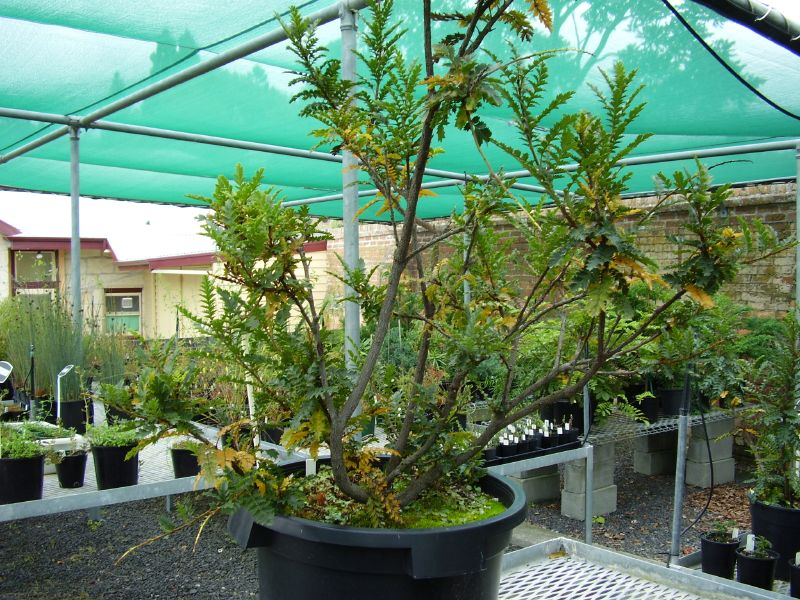
- Lomatia tasmanica in Hobart Botanical Garden

Conservation status
- Critically endangered (EPBC Act)

Scientific classification
- Kingdom: Plantae
- Clade: Tracheophytes
- Clade: Angiosperms
- Clade: Eudicots
- Order: Proteales
- Family: Proteaceae
- Genus: Lomatia
- Species: L. tasmanica

Binomial name
- Lomatia tasmanica W.M.Curtis

= Lomatia tasmanica =

King's lomatia

Species of shrub native to Tasmania, Australia

Lomatia tasmanica, commonly known as King's lomatia or King's holly, is a shrub of the family Proteaceae native to Tasmania. Growing up to 8 metres (26 ft) tall, the plant has shiny green pinnate leaves and bears red flowers in the summer, but yields neither fruit nor seeds. King's lomatia is unusual because all of the remaining plants are genetically identical clones. Because it has three sets of chromosomes (a triploid) and is therefore sterile, reproduction occurs only vegetatively: when a branch falls, that branch grows new roots, establishing a new plant that is genetically identical to its parent.

Charles Denison "Deny" King discovered the plant in 1934, though it was not described until 1967 by botanist Winifred Mary Curtis of the Tasmanian Herbarium. Only two wild populations of King's lomatia are known to exist in south-west Tasmania.

== Description ==
The individual plants of L. tasmanica are straggly shrubs or small trees to 8 m (26 ft) high, though taller or longer trunked specimens are often bent over. The trunks of very old plants can reach diameters of 8 cm (3.1 in). The upper branchlets are covered in fine rusty fur. The stems may grow roots from nodes on the ground. The leaves are alternately arranged and more crowded toward the ends of branches. Roughly oval in shape, they are 10–18 cm (3.9–7.1 in) long and pinnate, made up of 11 to 25 primary lobes that have irregularly toothed margins and are sometimes subdivided into smaller lobes. The upper surface is green and shiny, while the undersurface is partly hairy, particularly along the midrib. Flowering takes place in February. The terminal flowerheads, or inflorescences, are 9–10 cm (3.5–3.9 in) long.

== Taxonomy ==
Charles Denison "Deny" King discovered the plant in May 1934 while mining tin in the remote southwest of Tasmania. Winifred Curtis of the Tasmanian Herbarium named the plant in King's honour in 1967, after he sent specimens he collected at Cox's Bight, Port Davey to be identified in 1965. It is also sometimes called "King's holly", though it is not a holly.

L. tasmanica was thought to possibly be a hybrid between L. polymorpha and another species. Genetic analysis using microsatellite markers showed that species found close together geographically are most closely related to each other; L. tasmanica is the sister of a lineage that gave rise to the other two Tasmanian Lomatia species, L. polymorpha and L. tinctoria.

Subfossil remains identical to L. tasmanica were found in 43,600-year-old beds. The climate at that time was most likely as cool as or cooler than it is at Melaleuca today (an average yearly temperature of 11.5 °C (52.7 °F), with the coldest month having an average minimum of 4.5 °C (40 °F) and the warmest month an average maximum of 20 °C (68 °F)), and possibly wetter (more than 2400 mm of precipitation annually).

== Distribution and habitat ==
Two populations of Lomatia tasmanica are known to exist, with the first colony consisting of around 500 to 600 plants in an area of less than 1.2 km (0.75 mi) long in southwestern Tasmania as well as a second population of the species which was discovered in 2026, also in the south-west of Tasmania. The exact locations of the two populations are both kept secret. The climate is wet, receiving an average total of 1,700 mm (67 in) of rain each year, and all plants grow within 25 metres (82 ft) of a river or creek. L. tasmanica mainly grows in rainforest or mixed forest made up of trees 8–15 metres (26–49 ft) high such as myrtle beech (Lophozonia cunninghamii), celery-top pine (Phyllocladus aspleniifolius), southern sassafras (Atherosperma moschatum), leatherwood (Eucryphia lucida), satinwood (Nematolepis squamea), blue-green tea tree (Leptospermum glaucescens), and horizontal scrub (Anodopetalum biglandulosum), as well as understory species such as thyme archeria (Archeria serpyllifolia), native plum (Cenarrhenes nitida), sweet-scented trochocarpa (Trochocarpa gunnii), Raukaua gunnii, white waratah (Agastachys odorata), climbing heath (Prionotes cerinthoides), hard water fern (Parablechnum wattsii), and brickmaker's sedge (Gahnia grandis). Scattered Smithton peppermint (Eucalyptus nitida) tower over the canopy. Profuse moss and fern growth highlights the wetness of the habitat.

L. tasmanica also extends into neighbouring dry sclerophyll forest composed of Smithton peppermint over an understory of blue-green tea tree on more elevated areas. Finally, it grows in a dense riverbank scrubland with species such as silver banksia (Banksia marginata), mānuka (Leptospermum scoparium), prickly-leaved wattle (Acacia verticillata), swamp honey-myrtle (Melaleuca squamea), scented paperbark (M. squarrosa), horizontal scrub, and Smithton peppermint over a dense low understory of Bauera rubioides, Gahnia grandis, Epacris aff. heteronema, scrambling coral fern (Gleichenia microphylla), Calorophus erostris, lesser wire rush (Empodisma minus), and button grass (Gymnoschoenus sphaerocephalus).

== Ecology ==
Lomatia tasmanica grows in a climate of infrequent bushfires. Fieldwork in the early 2000s established that the area had last been burnt in 1934. Most plants were around 60 years old, though some were estimated at up to 300 years old. The area in which it grows is federally protected, lying wholly within the Southwest National Park.

Although all the plants are technically separate in that each has its own root system, they are collectively considered to be one of the oldest living plant clones. Each plant's lifespan is approximately 300 years, but the plant has been cloning itself for at least 43,600 years and possibly as long as 135,000 years. This estimate is based on radiocarbon dating of fossilised leaf fragments that were found 8.5 kilometres (5.3 mi) away from the extant colony. The fossilised fragments are identical to the contemporary plant in cell structure and shape, which suggests that the ancestral and modern plant are also genetically identical. This further implies that the ancestral plant was also triploid and therefore also clonal, due to the extreme rarity of naturally occurring sexually reproducing triploid organisms.

== Conservation ==
Lomatia tasmanica has been declared critically endangered under the Australian government's Environment Protection and Biodiversity Conservation Act 1999. It is also classified at a state level as "Endangered" under the Tasmanian government's Threatened Species Protection Act 1995.

The original plant group that King discovered in 1934 has disappeared (and likely died out), and the sole remaining group of approximately 500 to 600 plants covers a 1.2-kilometre-long area in the extreme southwest of Tasmania. This area is prone to fires and other natural threats to the plants, so Tasmania has begun an effort to develop other populations of L. tasmanica in controlled environments such as the Royal Tasmanian Botanical Gardens, which has been propagating the plant from cuttings since 1994. Because of its fragility and rarity, their specimens are not on display to the public. Due to its inability to reproduce sexually, there is no possibility of increasing the plant's genetic diversity to promote disease resistance through purely natural means.

Infestation with the oomycete pathogen Phytophthora cinnamomi has been recorded in other plant species around 20 metres (66 ft) away from some wild L. tasmanica populations. Bushfire could also spread this pathogen and potentially facilitate its infection of the remaining wild plants.

== Cultivation ==
Lomatia tasmanica strikes readily from cuttings but is difficult to keep alive in cultivation, often perishing when dried out. The cuttings are taken in January and February and take up to 12 months to form roots. Like their wild counterparts, the cultivated plants are susceptible to Phytophthora cinnamomi. L. tasmanica has been grafted successfully onto L. tinctoria, and the Botanic Gardens sought to trial grafting it onto L. ferruginea.

== Phytochemical profile ==
Lomatia tasmanica was subjected to natural products isolation methods by researchers at The University of Tasmania. Their study uncovered several unique compounds some of which are shared by other Lomatia. Long chain non-polar molecules Heptacosane and Nonacosane were found in relatively fair yield. Juglone, and Glucose Pentaacetate were also found from extractions done on the leaves of the plant. Uniquely developed Pressurized Hot Water Extraction (PHWE) utilising a household espresso machine was conducted on the leaves as well as a Diethyl-Ether maceration. Juglone and other naphthoquinone pigments have been previously isolated from Lomatia species. It is possible to speculate that the presence of a single naphthoquinone in L. tasmanica reflects the primitive and ancient position of it within the Lomatia lineage.

== See also ==
- List of oldest trees
