= L. polymorpha =

L. polymorpha may refer to:

- Lampetis polymorpha, a jewel beetle
- Leptasterias polymorpha, a sea star
- Lomatia polymorpha, a plant native to western and southern Tasmania
