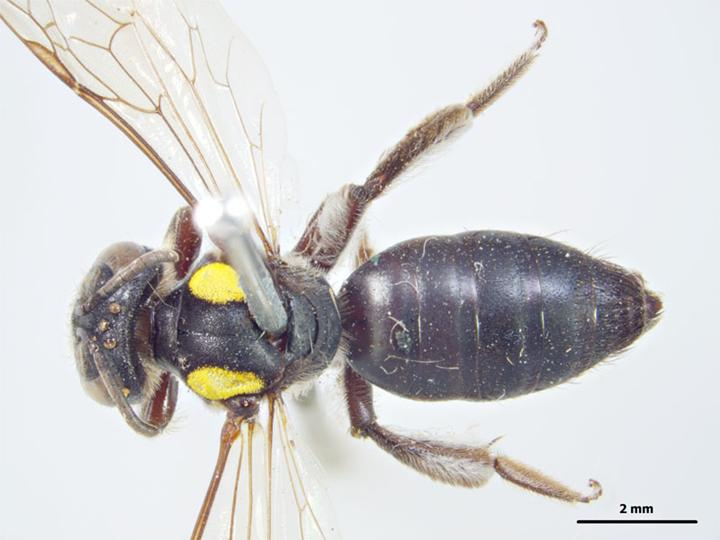
- Female

Scientific classification
- Kingdom: Animalia
- Phylum: Arthropoda
- Clade: Pancrustacea
- Class: Insecta
- Order: Hymenoptera
- Family: Colletidae
- Genus: Leioproctus
- Species: L. irroratus

Binomial name
- Leioproctus irroratus (Smith, 1853)

Synonyms
- Lamprocolletes irroratus Smith, 1853; Dasycolletes humerosus Smith, 1879

= Leioproctus irroratus =

Species of bee

Leioproctus irroratus, or Leioproctus (Leioproctus) irroratus, is a species of bee in the family Colletidae and subfamily Colletinae. It is endemic to Australia. It was described by English entomologist Frederick Smith in 1853.

== Distribution and habitat ==
The species occurs in eastern mainland Australia. Type localities include Melbourne.

== Behaviour ==
The adults are flying mellivores. Flowering plants visited by the bees include Lomatia, Macadamia and Eucalyptus species.

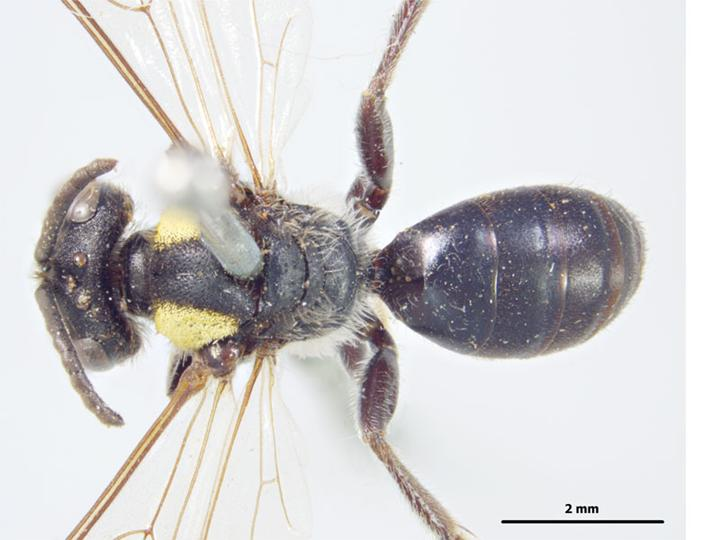
Male
