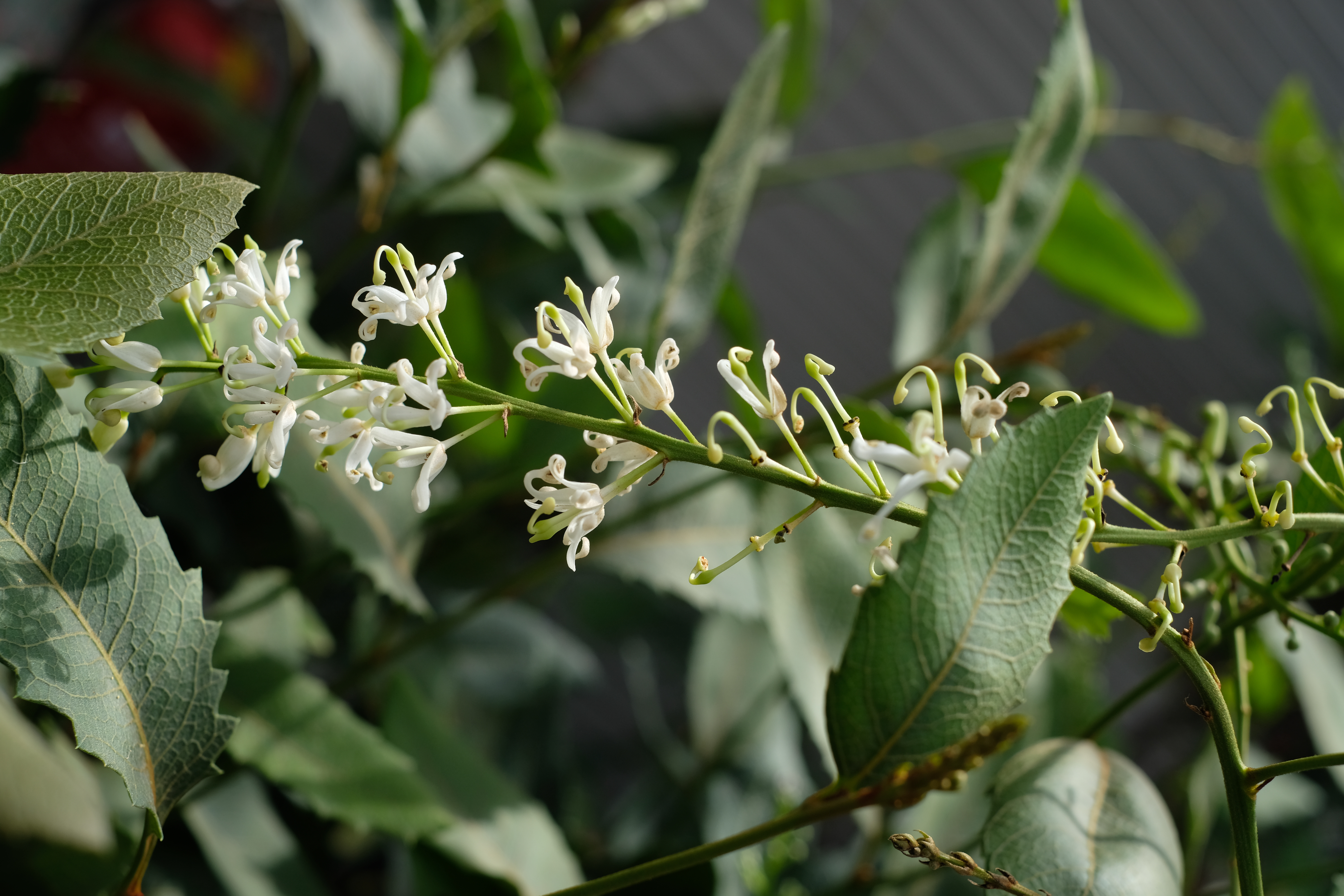
- Lomatia ilicifolia (cultivated) in Ku-Ring-Gai Wildflower Garden (N.S.W.)

Scientific classification
- Kingdom: Plantae
- Clade: Tracheophytes
- Clade: Angiosperms
- Clade: Eudicots
- Order: Proteales
- Family: Proteaceae
- Genus: Lomatia
- Species: L. ilicifolia

Binomial name
- Lomatia ilicifolia R.Br.

Synonyms
- Embothrium ilicifolium (R.Br.) Poir. Tricondylus ilicifolius (R.Br.) Kuntze nom. rej.

= Lomatia ilicifolia =

Species of plant endemic to Australia

Lomatia ilicifolia, commonly known as holly lomatia or native holly, is a plant in the family Proteaceae and is endemic to south-eastern Australia. It is a stiff, erect shrub with hairy, rust-coloured new growth and which recovers from fire from a lignotuber. It has dull green, leathery, prickly, holly-like leaves and long sprays of cream flowers, usually after fire.

== Description ==
Lomatia ilicifolia is a stiff, erect shrub which grows to a height of 0.5–3 m (2–10 ft) and has its young foliage and flower buds covered with rust-coloured hairs. The leaves are dull green, leathery and holly-like, mostly glabrous and egg-shaped to lance-shaped or elliptic. They are 6–20 cm (2–8 in) long, 2.5–3.5 cm (0.98–1.4 in) wide, have sharp teeth along their edges and a prominent network of veins.

The flowers are arranged on the ends of the stems in a spike-like panicle or raceme 15–30 cm (6–10 in) long, each flower on a stalk 8–12 mm (0.3–0.5 in) long. The flowers are white or cream-coloured, 10–12 mm (0.4–0.5 in) long and more or less glabrous. Flowering occurs from November to February, usually following fire the previous summer, and is followed about three months later by the fruit which is a dark brown, leathery follicle 15–30 mm (0.6–1 in) long containing about ten winged seeds.

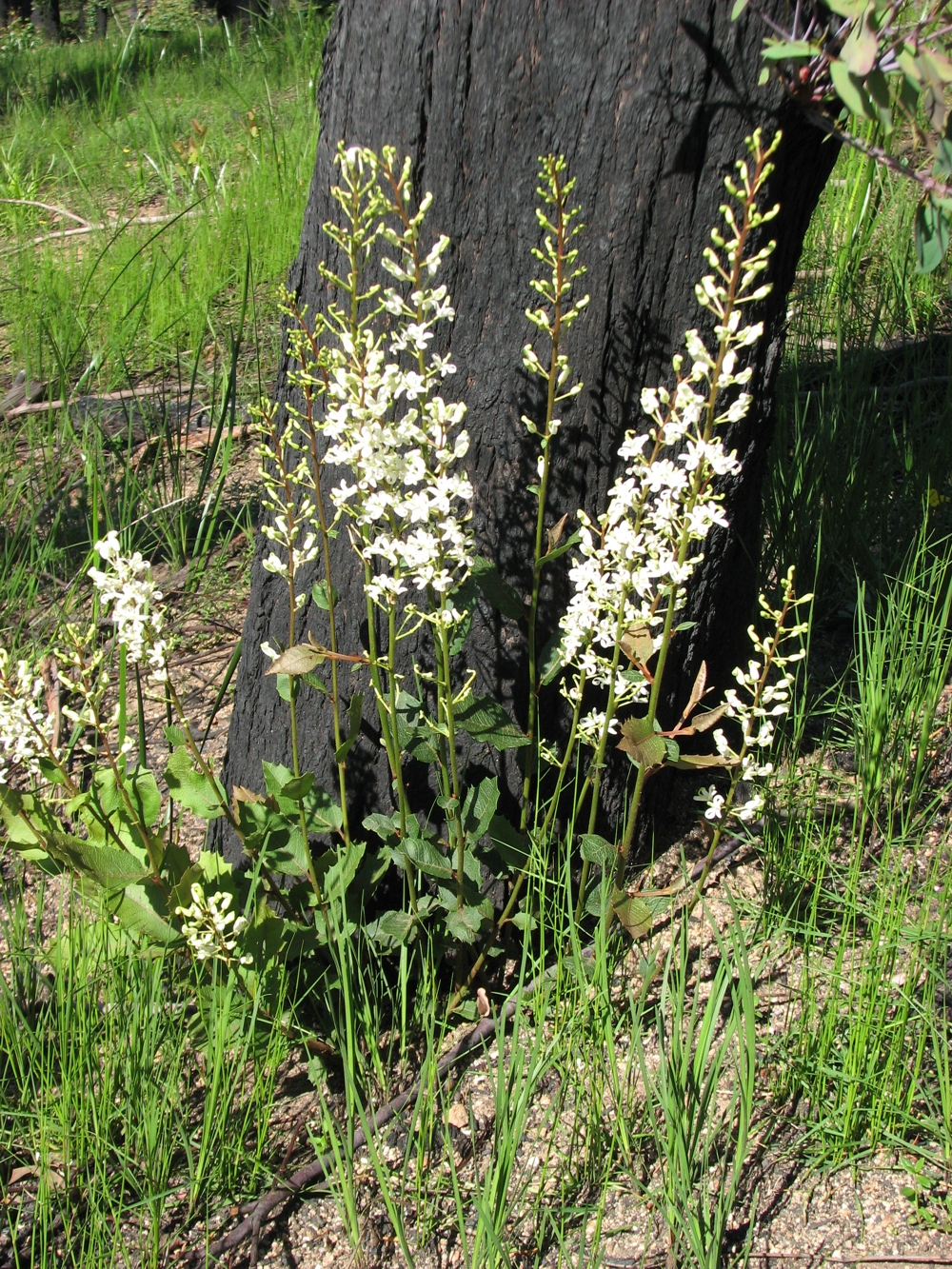
Lomatia ilicifolia after fire in Bunyip State Park in Victoria

Hybrids with L. myricoides, L. silaifolia and L. fraseri occasionally occur where these species grow near L. ilicifolia.

== Taxonomy and naming ==
Lomatia ilicifolia was first formally described in 1810 by Robert Brown from a specimen collected near Port Phillip. The description was published in Transactions of the Linnean Society of London.

The specific epithet (ilicifolia) is derived from the Latin words ilex, ilicis meaning "holm-oak, a genus of the holly family" and folium meaning "leaf".

== Distribution and habitat ==
Native holly is widespread and locally common in south-eastern Victoria where it grows in heath or woodland, sometimes in montane forests, from the Otway Ranges eastward to Gippsland. In New South Wales it grows in sclerophyll forest on the coast and nearby ranges south of Moss Vale.

== Ecology ==
Native holly attracts nectar-feeding butterflies.

== Use in horticulture ==
This lomatia is a hardy, slow-growing plant with interesting foliage, well-displayed flowers and attractive fruit. It is frost-tolerant and grows in full sun or partial shade.
