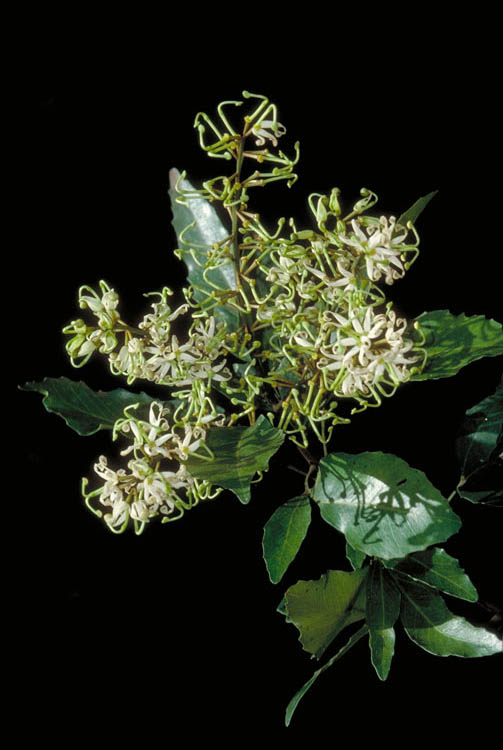

Conservation status
- Least Concern (NCA)

Scientific classification
- Kingdom: Plantae
- Clade: Embryophytes
- Clade: Tracheophytes
- Clade: Spermatophytes
- Clade: Angiosperms
- Clade: Eudicots
- Order: Proteales
- Family: Proteaceae
- Genus: Lomatia
- Species: L. milnerae

Binomial name
- Lomatia milnerae Olde

Synonyms
- Lomatia fraxinifolia F.Muell. ex Benth.

= Lomatia milnerae =

Species of flowering plant

Lomatia milnerae is a species of plant in the macadamia family Proteaceae. It is endemic to northeastern Queensland, Australia, where it grows in well-developed rainforest above 700 m (2,300 ft) altitude.
