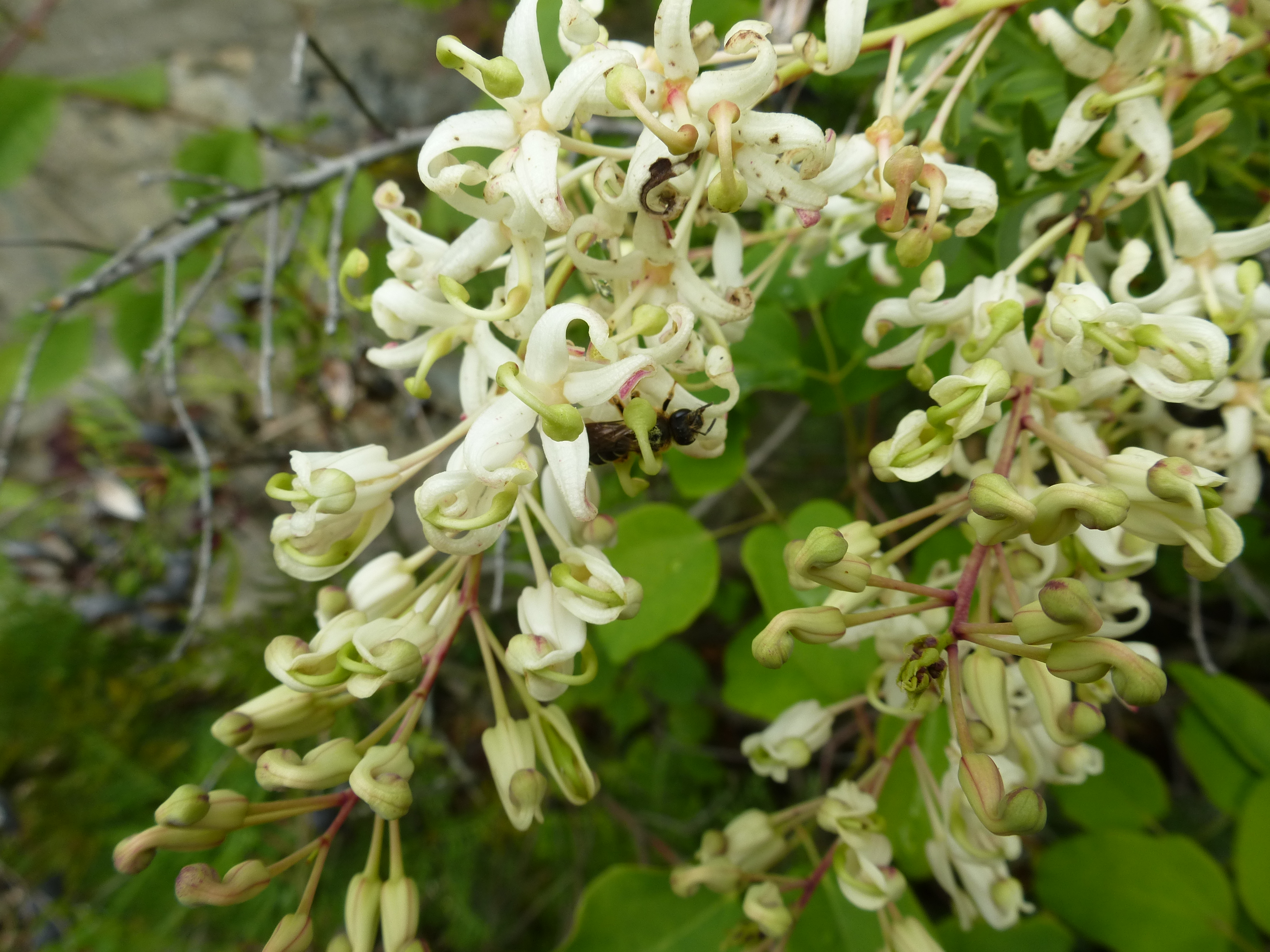
- Lomatia tinctoria in the Royal Botanic Garden Edinburgh

Scientific classification
- Kingdom: Plantae
- Clade: Tracheophytes
- Clade: Angiosperms
- Clade: Eudicots
- Order: Proteales
- Family: Proteaceae
- Genus: Lomatia
- Species: L. tinctoria

Binomial name
- Lomatia tinctoria (Labill.) R.Br.

= Lomatia tinctoria =

Guitar plant

Species of shrub

Lomatia tinctoria, commonly known as guitar plant, is a shrub to about 2 metres tall of the family Proteaceae. It is one of three species of Lomatia endemic to Tasmania, the others being L. polymorpha and L. tasmanica. Lomatia tinctoria is closely related to L. polymorpha, with which it sometimes hybridises. Its leaves are divided, while those of L. polymorpha are simple.

== Description ==
Lomatia tinctoria grows as a woody shrub reaching 1.5 m (5 ft) high, or rarely up to 2 m (7 ft) high. The leaves are strongly lobed (pinnate or bipinnate) and are around 8 cm long. The white or cream flower heads, known as inflorescences, appear in summer.

The common name of guitar plant may refer to the shape of the fruit.

== Taxonomy and naming ==
French naturalist Jacques Labillardière first described this species as Embothrium tinctorium in 1805, with the species name, Latin tinctoria "used in dyeing", relating to a product in the fruit that can be used for dyeing. At the time, Embothrium was a wastebasket taxon to which many proteaceae were assigned. It was given its current binomial name by Robert Brown in his 1810 On the natural order of plants called Proteaceae. An alternative name, Tricondylus silaifolius, published by Joseph Knight in his 1809 On the cultivation of the plants belonging to the natural order of Proteeae, was rejected, after Brown's 1810 description of the genus Lomatia was officially conserved against Salisbury's 1809 Tricondylus.

== Distribution and habitat ==
Lomatia tinctoria is found in north eastern Tasmania, "mostly north and east of the Pieman and Derwent rivers and on Cape Barren and on and Flinders Islands". Lomatia polymorpha occurs "approximately south of the Pieman River and west of the Derwent River" but where the ranges overlap, as for example near Lake St Clair, apparent hybrids occur, even though the leaves of the two species are "strikingly different".

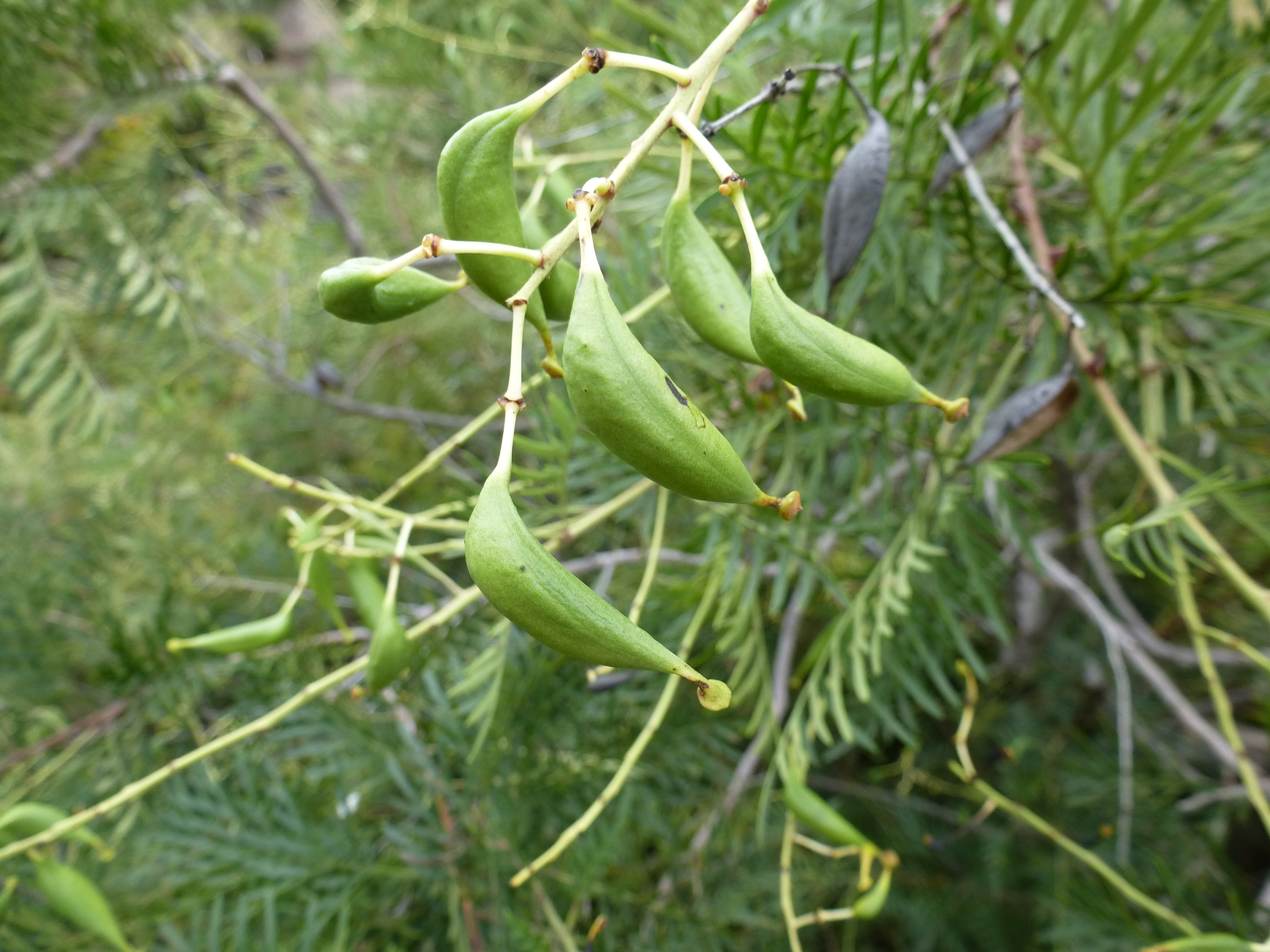
Immature fruit.

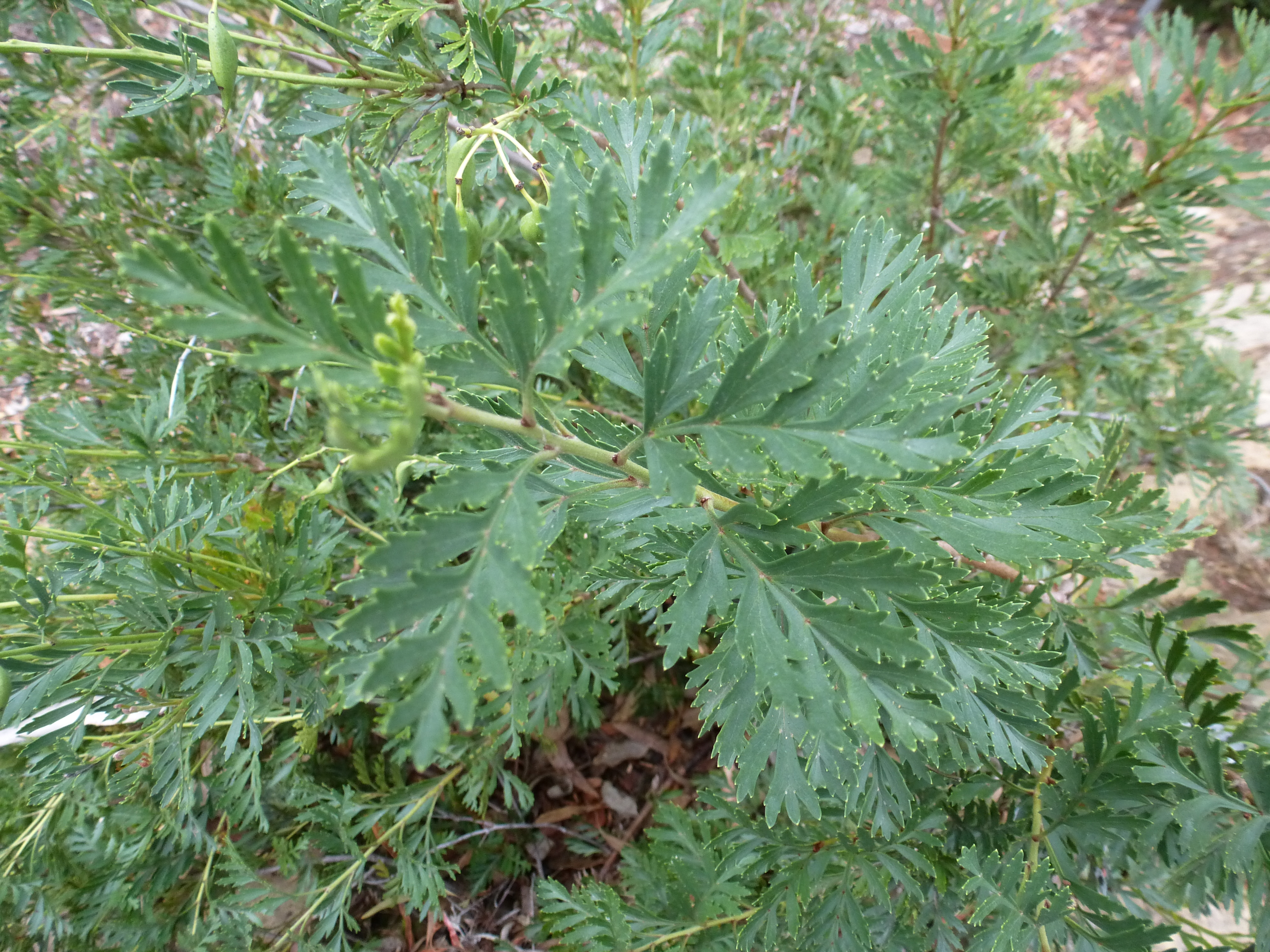
Leaves in the ANBG

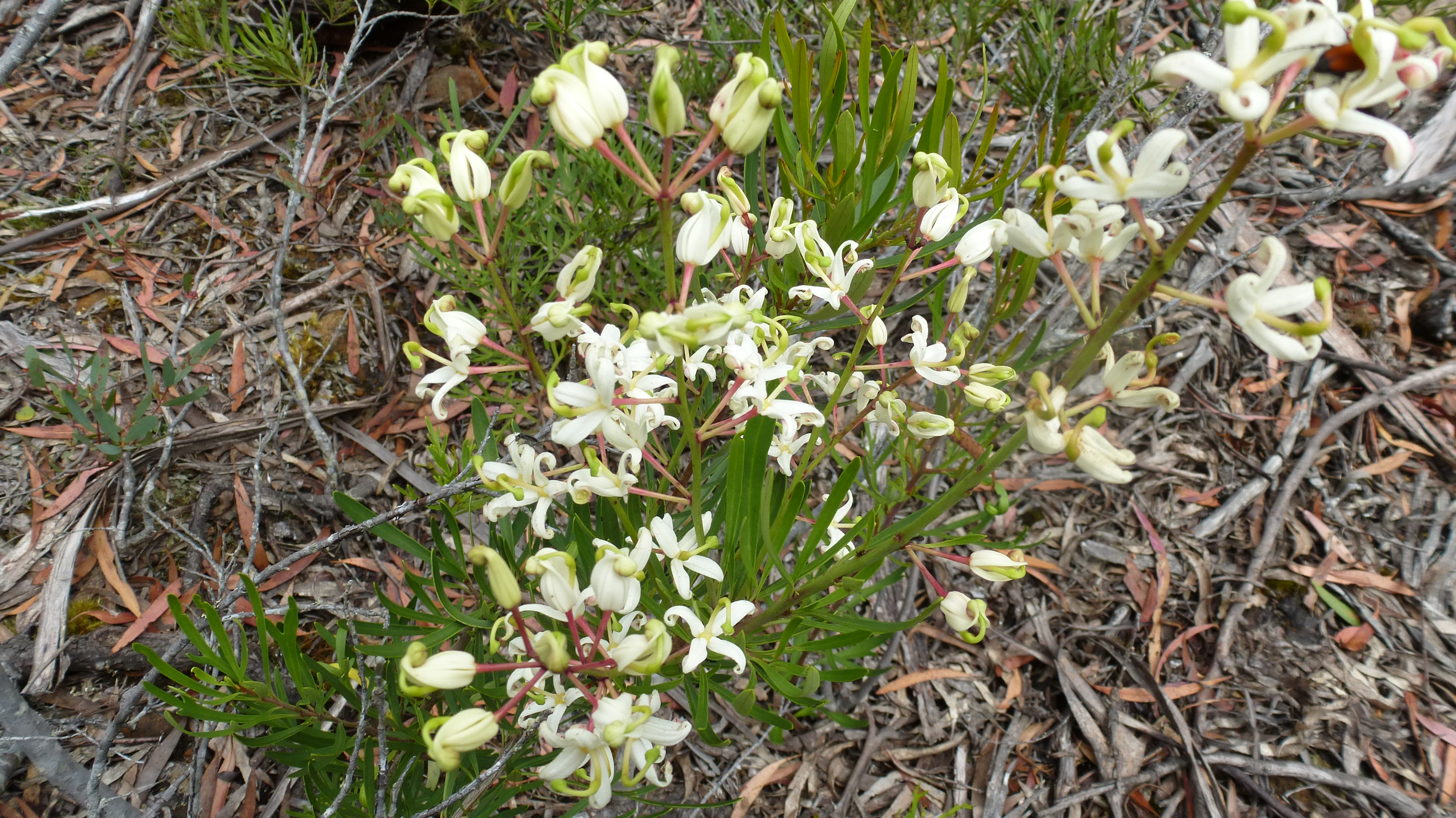
L. tinctoria x polymorpha hybrid near Lake St Clair.

== Use in horticulture ==
Lomatia tinctoria can be grown in gardens, doing best on acidic well-drained soils, and tolerating sunny or shady locations. It is readily propagated from seed or cuttings.

== External sources ==
- http://apps.kew.org/herbcat/getImage.do?imageBarcode=K000324612
- Curtis, Samuel (1844). Curtis's Botanical Magazine Volume 70. London: Edward Couchman. p. 255. available as eBook
- Sprawson, Warwick (2010). The Overland Track. Red Dog. p. 185. ISBN 9781742035116.
- Gardiner, Jim (2011). The Timber Press Encyclopedia of Flowering Shrubs (1. ed.). Portland, [Or.]: Timber Press. p. 226. ISBN 9780881928235.
- Australian Native Plants Society (Australia) http://anpsa.org.au/l-tin.html
