= Deny King =

Australian tin miner and nature lover

Deny King AM
- Born: Charles Denison King; 12 September 1909; Huonville, Tasmania
- Died: 12 May 1991 (aged 81); Hobart, Tasmania
- Occupations: Naturalist, ornithologist, artist, miner
- Known for: Preservation of the orange-bellied parrot
- Spouse: Margaret Ann Cadell
- Children: Mary and Janet

Charles Denison (Deny) King AM (12 September 1909 – 12 May 1991) was an Australian naturalist, ornithologist, environmentalist, painter and tin miner. He spent 55 years living in Melaleuca in Port Davey, part of the remote South West Wilderness of Tasmania where he discovered the extinct shrub, Banksia kingii, among other major exploits.

== Biography ==
King was a tin miner by profession and followed his father, Charlie, to Melaleuca in 1936, where he built a house, which was accommodation for himself and workers as well as the airstrip which opened up tourism for the South West Wilderness.

On 6 June 1940, Deny King enlisted in the Australian Army where he served through World War II being discharged on 15 October 1945.

On 5 November 1949, Deny King married Margaret Ann Cadell at St David's Cathedral, Hobart. The couple had two daughters, Mary and Janet.

He was instrumental in preserving the habitat of the orange-bellied parrot and it was in Melaleuca that he discovered the extinct tree or shrub Banksia kingii. King also discovered a species of eyebright, Euphrasia kingii (nowadays known as Euphrasia gibbsiae subspecies kingii), as well as a flowering evergreen in the Protea family (Proteaceae): King's Lomatia (also known as King's holly, Lomatia tasmanica).

In 1971, the King family's life at Melaleuca was the subject of an episode of the ABC television series "A Big Country".

In 1975, King was appointed as a Member of the Order of Australia for his community service.

On 12 May 1991, Deny King died suddenly of a heart attack at the home of his daughter Mary King in Hobart. He was cremated and his ashes scattered at Melaleuca.
