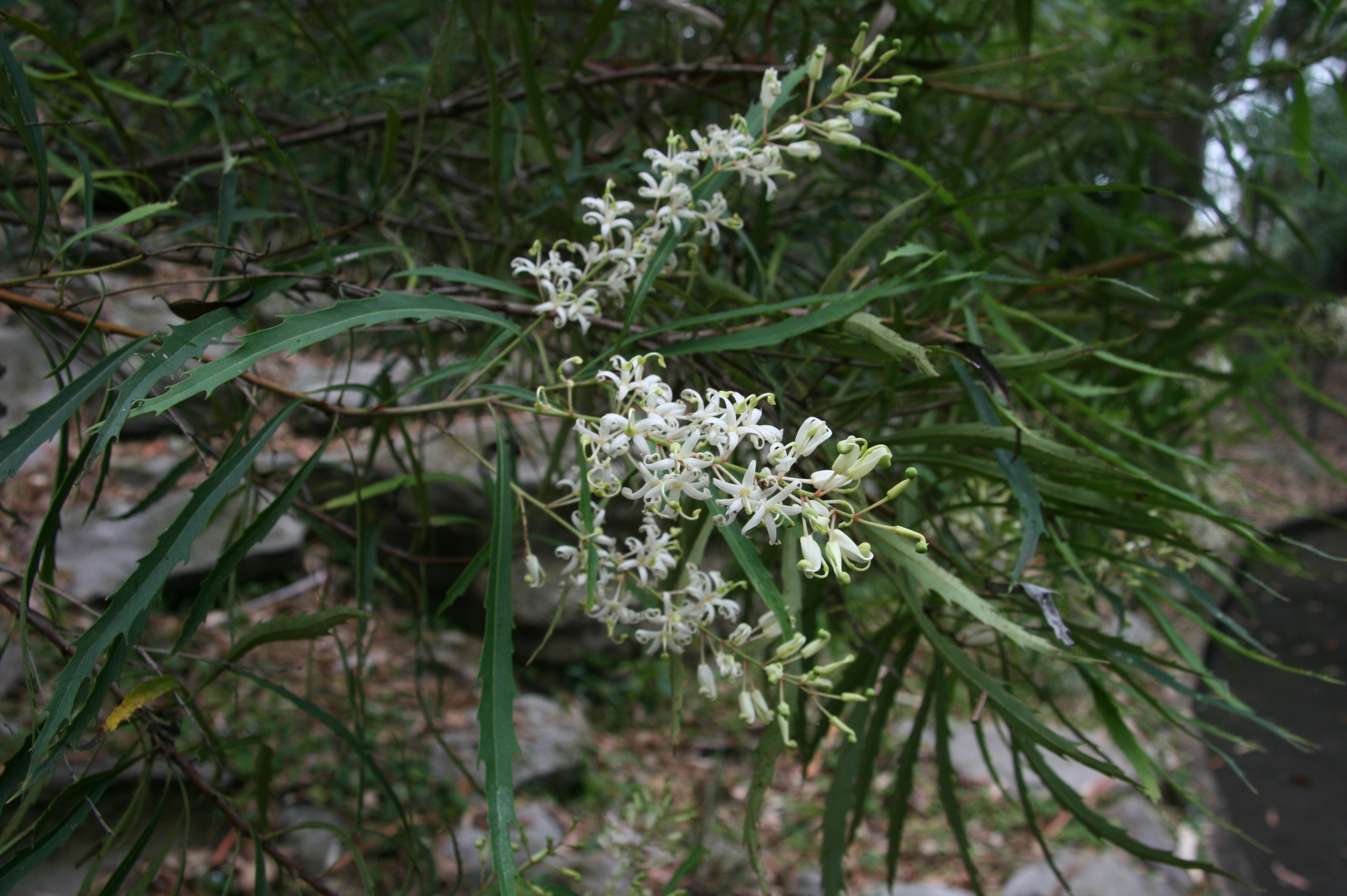

Scientific classification
- Kingdom: Plantae
- Clade: Tracheophytes
- Clade: Angiosperms
- Clade: Eudicots
- Order: Proteales
- Family: Proteaceae
- Genus: Lomatia
- Species: L. myricoides

Binomial name
- Lomatia myricoides (C.F.Gaertn.) Domin

Synonyms
- List: Embothrium longifolium (R.Br.) Poir Embothrium myricoides C.F.Gaertn. Lomatia arguta Gand. Lomatia densa Gand. Lomatia fallacina Gand. Lomatia longifolia R.Br. Lomatia longifolia var. arborescens Benth. Lomatia longifolia R.Br. var. longifolia Lomatia longifolia var. reticulata Meisn. Lomatia longifolia var. subevenia Meisn. Lomatia praelonga Gand. Lomatia stenophylla Gand. Tricondylus myricaefolius Knight orth. var. Tricondylus myricifolius Knight Tricondylus myricoides (C.F.Gaertn.) Kuntze nom. rej.

= Lomatia myricoides =

Species of plant

Lomatia myricoides, commonly known as river lomatia, mountain beech or long-leaf lomatia, is a species of flowering plant in the family Proteaceae and is endemic to south-eastern Australia. It is a shrub or small tree with simple, linear leaves, groups of white, cream-coloured or greenish-yellow flowers, and dark greyish-brown follicles.

== Description ==
Lomatia myricoides grows as a woody shrub or small tree, reaching 2–5 m (6.6–16.4 ft) high, or rarely up to 8 m (26 ft) high. The leaves are usually linear, sometimes lance-shaped or oblong, 50–200 mm (2.0–7.9 in) long and 5–20 mm (0.20–0.79 in) wide and have a pointed apex. They are glabrous and the leaf edges may be straight or adorned with several serrations. The flowers grow in groups in leaf axils, the groups 50–100 mm (2.0–3.9 in) long and usually shorter than the leaves. The flowers are white, cream or greenish-yellow. Flowering occurs from December to February, and the fruits are follicles 25–35 mm (0.98–1.38 in) long containing winged seeds.

== Taxonomy ==
German botanist Karl Friedrich von Gaertner first described this species in 1807 as Embothrium myricoides in his Supplementum Carpologicae. At the time, Embothrium was a wastebasket taxon to which many proteaceae were assigned. It was given its current binomial name by Karel Domin in 1921. The species name comes from the resemblance of the leaves to those of the genus Myrica. (The suffix -oides means "likeness" in Latin.) Common names include river lomatia, mountain beech and long-leaf lomatia.

Hybrids have been recorded with tree lomatia (Lomatia fraseri) on the Southern Tablelands, with native holly (L. ilicifolia) on the New South Wales south coast, and with crinkle bush (L. silaifolia) on the New South Wales Central Coast and Central Tablelands. Analysis of chloroplast DNA showed that there is extensive hybridization between the five species (L. arborescens, L. fraseri, L. ilicifolia, L. myricoides and L. silaifolia) of mainland southeastern Australia, though each is distinct enough to warrant species status.

== Distribution and habitat ==
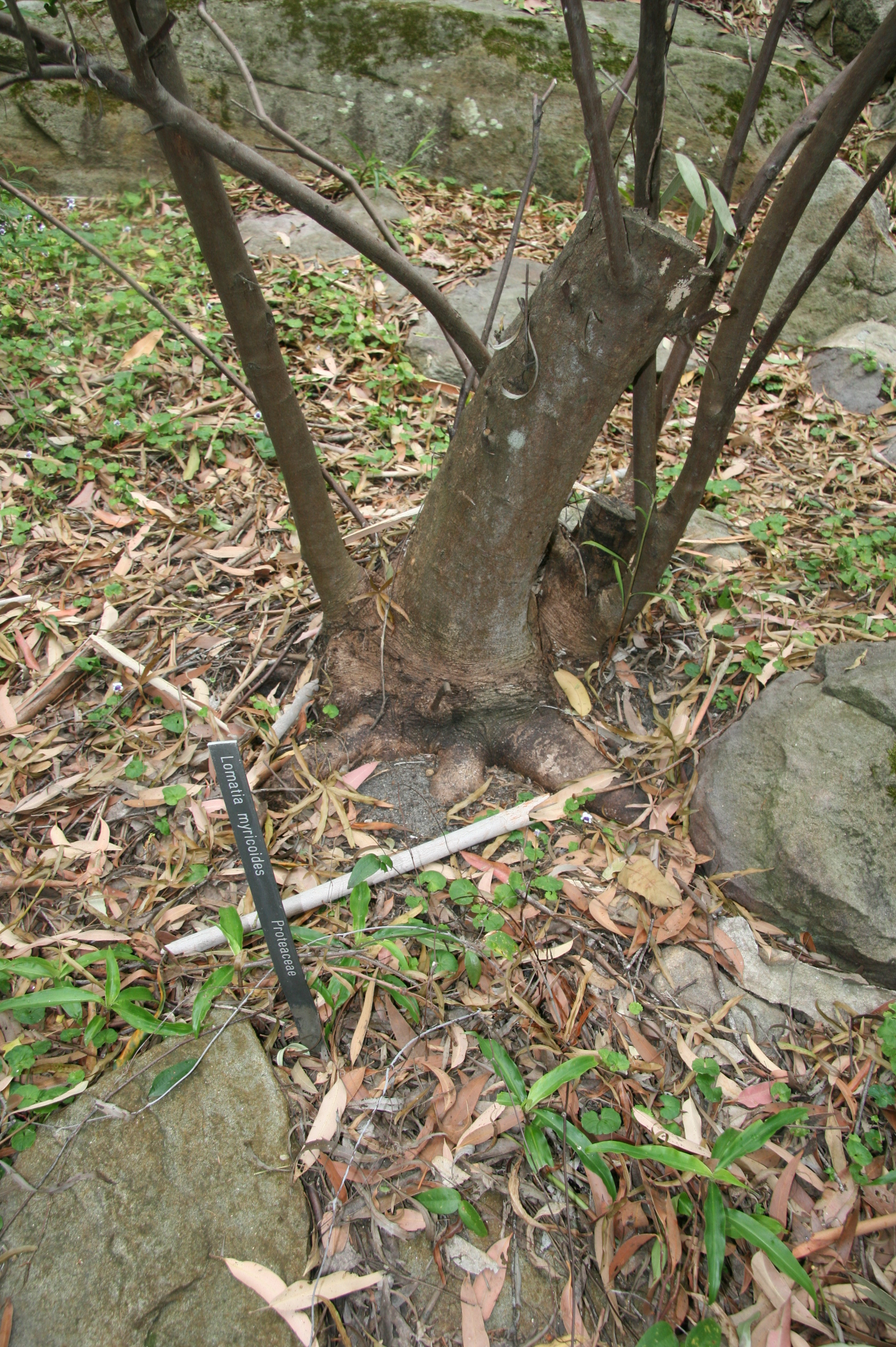
Woody base

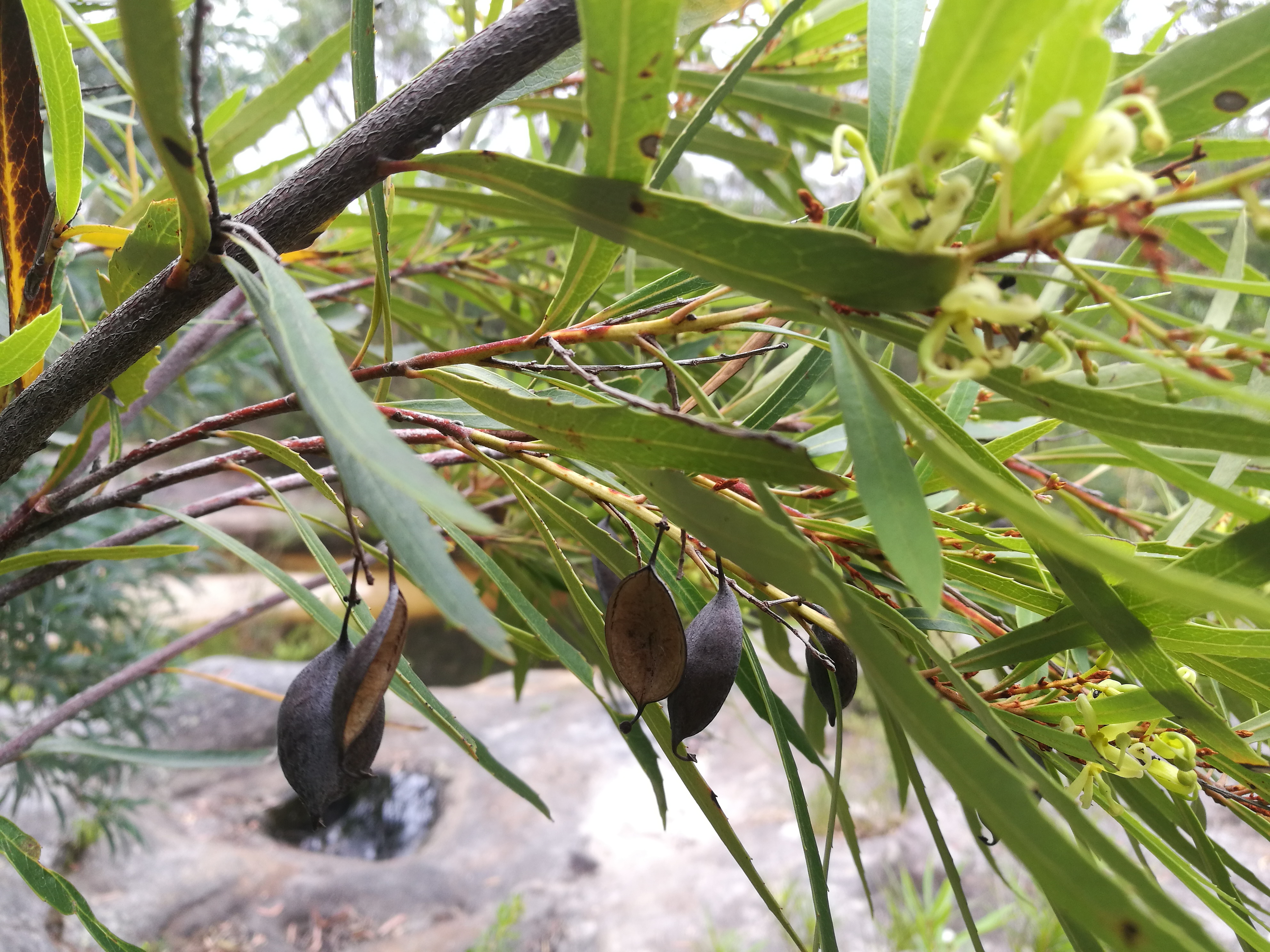
Dehiscent fruit

The range is from the New South Wales Central Coast south into eastern Victoria to the Dandenong Ranges. Lomatia myricoides is found in moist sheltered areas such as riverbank forests and montane forest, on loamy or sandy alluvial, or on basalt-derived soils. Associated species along watercourses include watergum (Tristaniopsis laurina), grey myrtle (Backhousia myrtifolia), cedar wattle (Acacia elata), coachwood (Ceratopetalum apetalum), tantoon (Leptospermum polygalifolium) and coral fern (Gleichenia dicarpa). Montane trees that L. myricoides grows as an understory with include broad-leaved manna gum (Eucalyptus mannifera), broad-leaved peppermint (E. dives), as well as the shrubs daphne heath (Brachyloma daphnoides) and prickly broom heath (Monotoca scoparia).

== Ecology ==
It has a woody lignotuber, from which it regenerates after bushfire. Small ants and flies forage for nectar in the flowers.

== Use in horticulture ==
Not commonly seen in cultivation, Lomatia myricoides grows in semi-shade in situations with some moisture. It appears to tolerate Phytophthora cinnamomi.

Joseph Maiden reported that its wood was light and hard, and easily worked.
