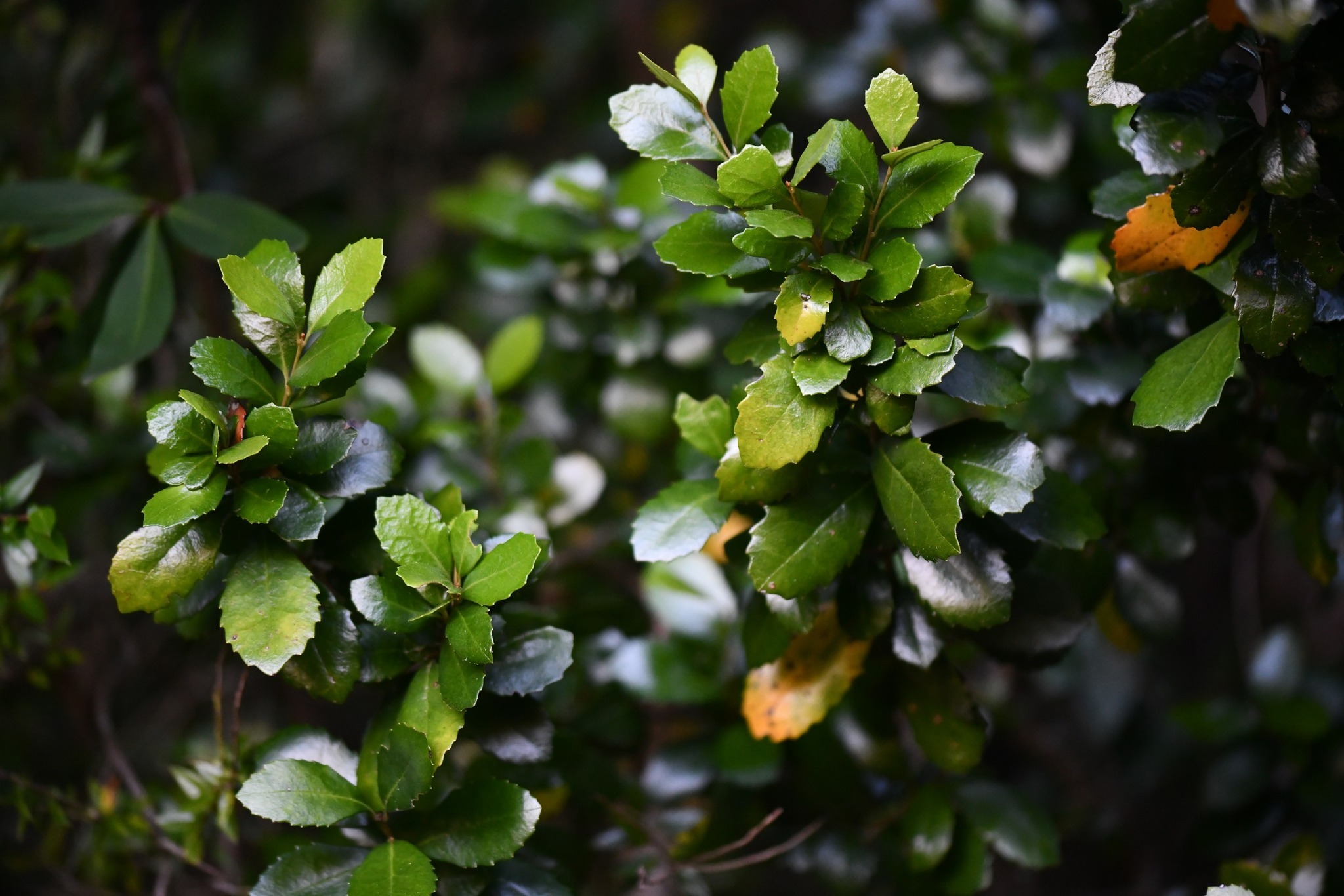

Scientific classification
- Kingdom: Plantae
- Clade: Tracheophytes
- Clade: Angiosperms
- Clade: Eudicots
- Order: Proteales
- Family: Proteaceae
- Genus: Lomatia
- Species: L. dentata

Binomial name
- Lomatia dentata (Ruiz & Pav.) R.Br.

Synonyms
- Embothrium dentatum Ruiz & Pav; Tricondylus dentatus (Ruiz & Pav.) O.Kuntze

= Lomatia dentata =

Species of tree native to South America

Lomatia dentata, commonly known as piñol or avellanillo, is a species of tree in the family Proteaceae. It is native to southern Argentina and Chile, the Patagonia region of South America.

== Description ==
Lomatia dentata is a small evergreen tree growing to a height of about 10 m (33 ft). The alternate leaves have short stalks and are oval, drawn out at the base and bluntly toothed on the upper two thirds. They are glossy dark green above and pale green below, with the midrib very pronounced on the underside. They are 3 to 8 cm (1.2 to 3.1 in) long and 1 to 3 cm (0.4 to 1.2 in) wide.

The flowers are borne in small corymbs in the axils of the leaves. They are irregular, red or white, with four tepals, four short stamens and a long style that persists in fruit.

The fruits are woody, winged follicles, oblong and tapering towards the base. The ripe fruits and the seeds are brown.
