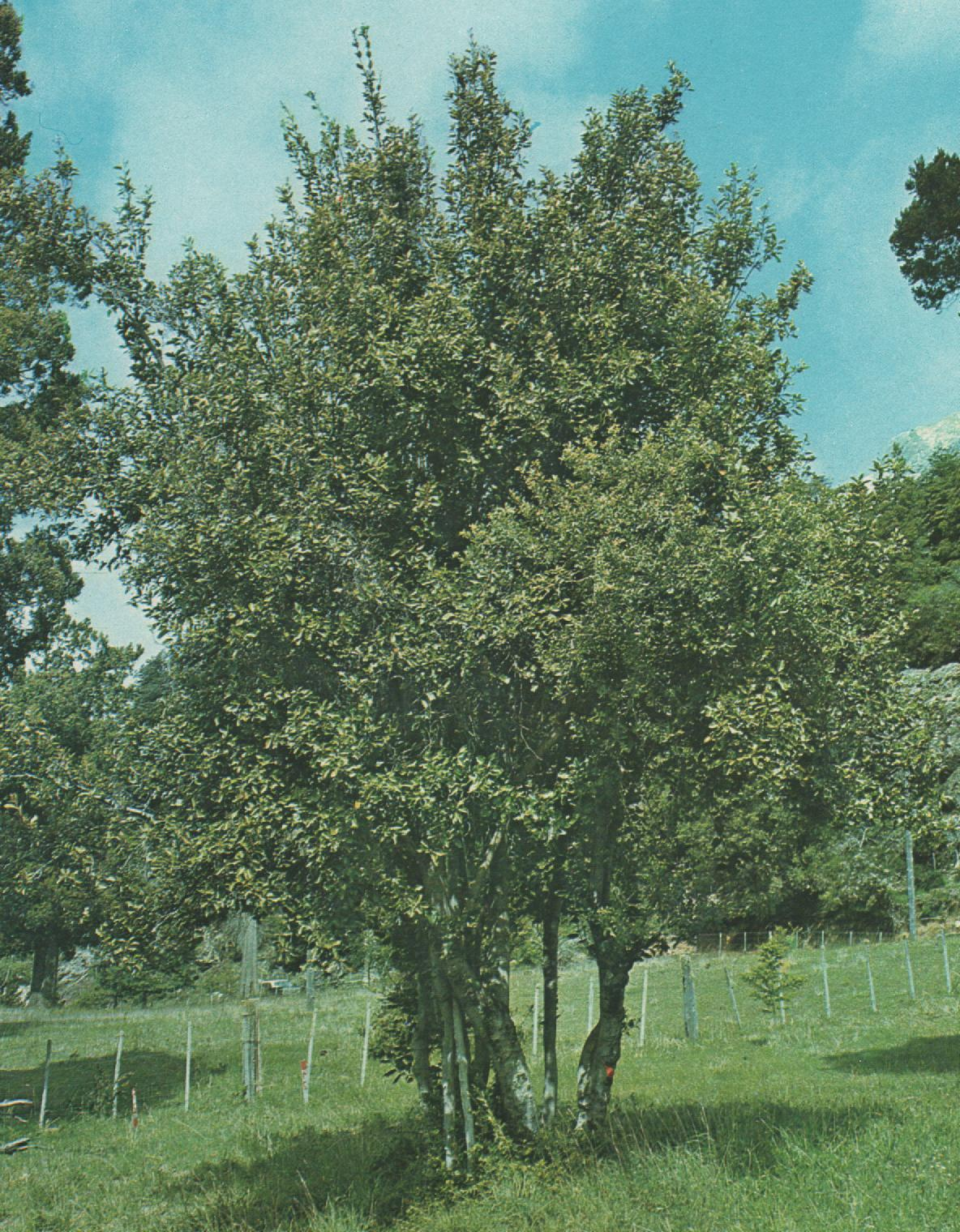
- Radal

Scientific classification
- Kingdom: Plantae
- Clade: Tracheophytes
- Clade: Angiosperms
- Clade: Eudicots
- Order: Proteales
- Family: Proteaceae
- Genus: Lomatia
- Species: L. hirsuta

Binomial name
- Lomatia hirsuta Diels ex J.F.Macbr.

= Lomatia hirsuta =

Species of tree native to Argentina, Chile, and Peru

Lomatia hirsuta, known as radal, is a species of flowering plant in the family Proteaceae. It is a tree native to Argentina, Chile, and Peru. In Chile, it grows from Coquimbo to Chiloe (36 to 42°S). It grows on a variety of soils and humidity. It grows on poor soils near ravines.

== Description ==
Lomatia hirsuta is an evergreen tree that measures up to 15 m (50 ft) tall and 80 cm (31 in) in diameter. Light-grey bark with longitudinal fissures.

The leaves are alternate, ovate, heart-shaped base, the petioles are about 2–3 cm (0.8–1.2 in) long, the leaves are 5–20 cm (2.0–7.9 in) long and 4–12 cm (1.6–4.7 in) wide, toothed edge, dark glossy green above and dull below, the nervation is distinct underneath.

The flowers are hermaphrodite, greenish-yellow color, covered in a rusty red, the flowers are arranged in axillary clustered inflorescences. Every flower is formed by four linear tepals, 4 sessile stamens and a shorter style.

The fruit is a greyish-black follicle almost woody and oval-oblong shaped 2–4 cm long, made up by two valves. Brown winged seeds arranged in imbricate form about 15 mm wide and 5.6 mm long.

== Etymology ==
Lomatia; from the Greek lomas ('fringe'), because of the seeds' edge, hirsuta from the Latin 'hairy'; the Spanish name is radal, which in turn comes from Mapudungun radal, the Mapuche name of this plant.

== Uses ==
The wood has beautiful marks, it is similar to Chilean hazel, but 'less elegant.' The leaves are used for dyeing wood brown color. It has been planted in Spain and in the British Isles as far north as Scotland.
