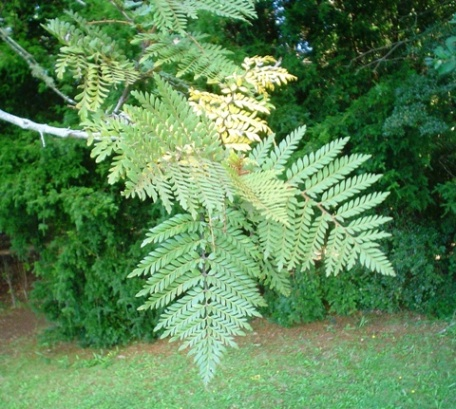

Conservation status
- Least Concern (IUCN 3.1)

Scientific classification
- Kingdom: Plantae
- Clade: Embryophytes
- Clade: Tracheophytes
- Clade: Angiosperms
- Clade: Eudicots
- Order: Proteales
- Family: Proteaceae
- Genus: Lomatia
- Species: L. ferruginea

Binomial name
- Lomatia ferruginea (Cav.) R.Br.

= Lomatia ferruginea =

Species of tree native to South America

Lomatia ferruginea, commonly known as fuinque, is a small evergreen tree in the family Proteaceae.

It is native to southern Argentina and Chile, the Patagonia region of South America. In Chile it grows from Curicó Province to Magallanes (35 to 49°). It is found mostly in deep and moist soils.

== Description ==
Lomatia ferruginea grows to 6 metres (20 ft) tall. It is evergreen, with few branches, newly shoots are covered in reddish-brown hairs. It has composite, bipinnate, fern-like opposite and petiolate leaves, 13–14 cm long and 8–10 cm wide, green above and reddish-brown below.

The flowers are hermaphrodite and pedicellate, 2 cm long, in racemes shorter than the leaves, made up by 14-16 opposite flowers, grayish-yellow in bud. Every flower is formed by four tepals which are oval lanceolate bicolor, reddish brown with green apex, then thinned and again wide at the concave apex of 1.5 cm long, with sessile anthers at the concave apex of the petals, long style, red bulky and oblique stigma.

The fruit is a woody dark brown follicle, 3.5-4.0 cm wide and 1 cm long, made up by two valves, thin pedicellate, like a peduncle downwards, upwards prolonged at the style. It has many imbricate seeds, winged and truncated at the tip, 1.5 cm wide and 0.5 mm.

== Taxonomy ==
Antonio José Cavanilles first described the species in 1798 as Embothrium ferrugineum. In 1810, Robert Brown transferred it to the genus Lomatia.

The genus name Lomatia comes from the Greek lomas, because of the seed's edge, and ferruginea from Latin, meaning ferrous or rusty, referring to the reddish-brown color in new buds.

== Cultivation and uses ==
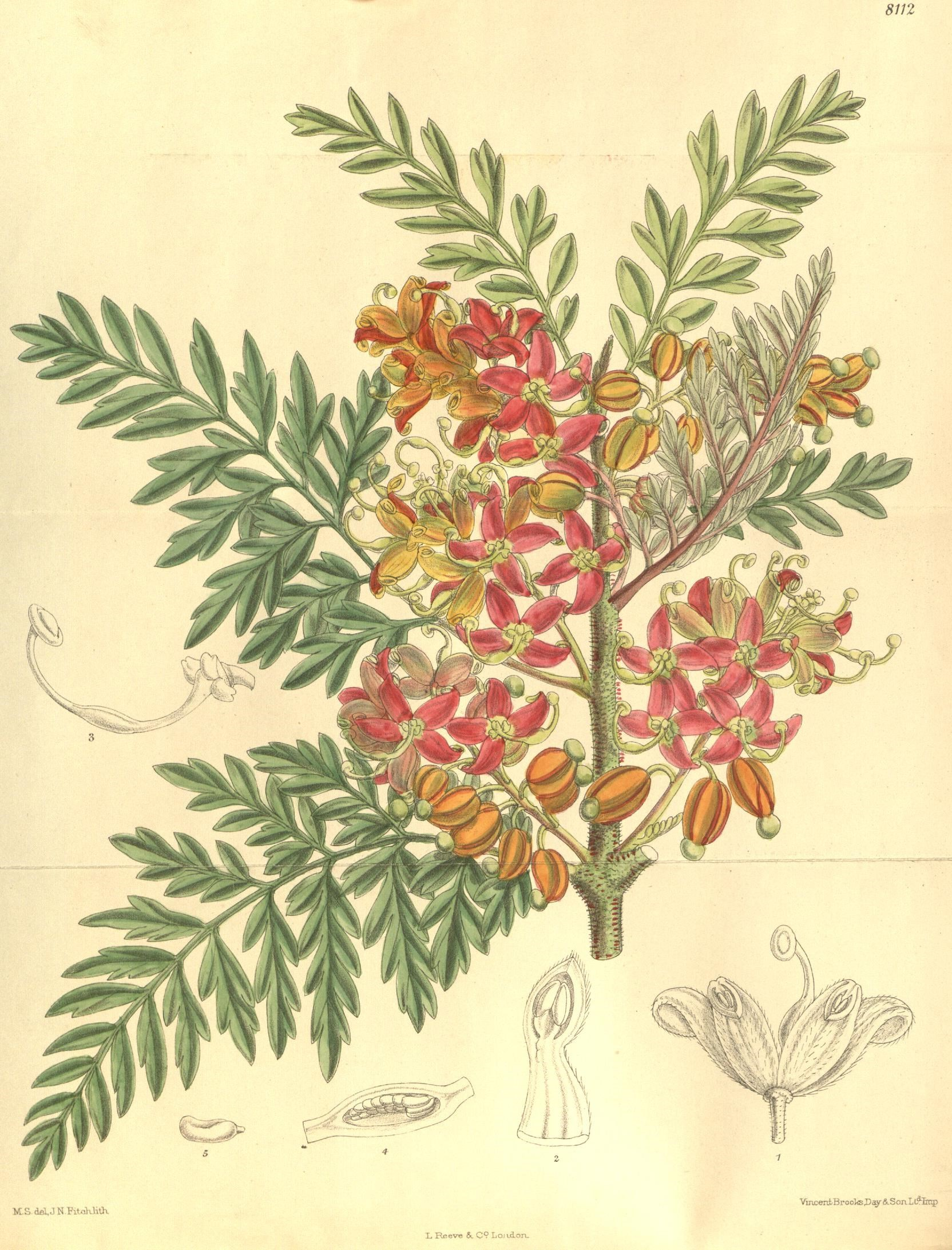
1907 illustration, Curtis's Botanical Magazine

The wood is valued for its grain and is much used in carpentry. It is highly valued as an ornamental tree in Chile. It has been planted in Scotland and in the Faroe Islands, where it regularly self-seeds.
