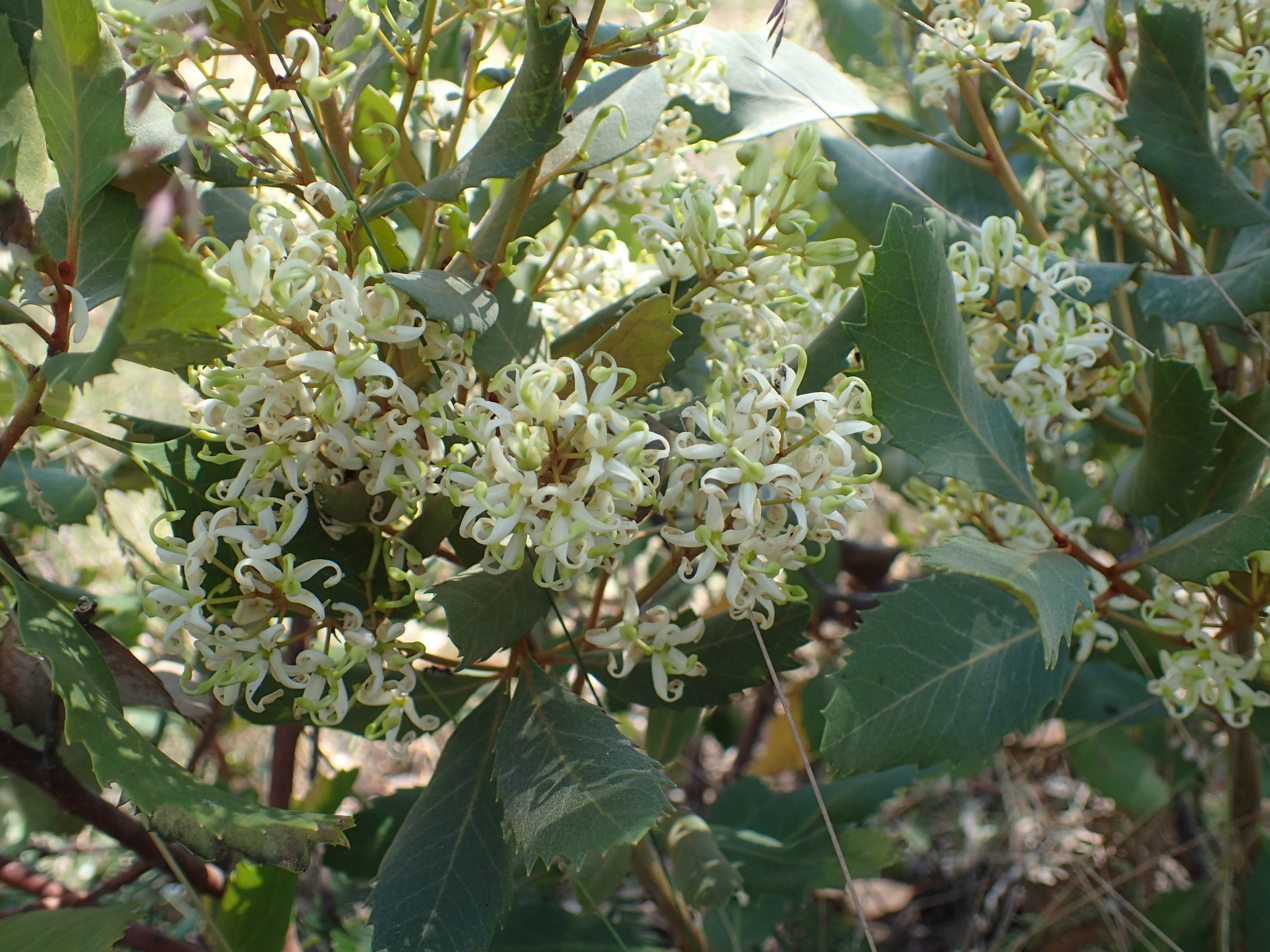
- Lomatia fraseri near Cathedral Rock National Park

Scientific classification
- Kingdom: Plantae
- Clade: Tracheophytes
- Clade: Angiosperms
- Clade: Eudicots
- Order: Proteales
- Family: Proteaceae
- Genus: Lomatia
- Species: L. fraseri

Binomial name
- Lomatia fraseri R.Br.

Synonyms
- Tricondylus fraseri (R.Br.) Kuntze

= Lomatia fraseri =

Species of plant native to eastern Australia

Lomatia fraseri, commonly known as tree lomatia, forest lomatia or silky lomatia is a plant of the family Proteaceae native to eastern Australia. It grows as a shrub or small tree, reaching 8–11 metres (26–36 ft) high, with highly variable leaves. The cream to white inflorescences appear over summer. It is found in rainforest margins, gullies and heathland in mountainous regions of Victoria and New South Wales. It regenerates from fire by regrowing from a lignotuber.

== Description ==
Lomatia fraseri grows as a tall shrub or small tree up to 8–11 metres (25–36 ft) high, though can be much smaller in exposed areas; on heathland in Werrikimbe National Park it is reduced to a height of 50 cm (20 in), and can be 2 m (6 ft 7 in) high in exposed areas in Victoria. It has lanceolate to elliptic leaves which range from entire to deeply pinnatisect and are between 6.5 and 15 (rarely 18) cm long and 1 to 3.5 (rarely 5) cm wide. The leaf margins are generally toothed, though occasionally entire or deeply lobed. The leaves are highly variable, and can even be markedly different on the same plant. The upper surfaces are green and glabrous, while the undersides are yellow-green and silky. The individual flowers are arranged in racemes that are up to 12 cm (5 in) long. They can be more crowded than those of other lomatias. These white to cream inflorescences appear between December and February in the species' native range, followed by the development of 1.5 to 3 cm (0.6 to 1.2 in) long dark grey follicles, which are ripe from April to October.

== Taxonomy ==
Scottish botanist Robert Brown described Lomatia fraseri in his 1830 work Supplementum primum Prodromi florae Novae Hollandiae, from a specimen that had been collected in the Sydney district (then known as Port Jackson) by Charles Fraser in 1818. George Bentham lumped L. fraseri and L ilicifolia together, treating them as one species in his 1870 work Flora Australiensis.

Hybrids have been recorded with the river lomatia (Lomatia myricoides) on the Southern Tablelands, resulting in plants resembling L. fraseri but less hairy, and with crinkle bush (L. silaifolia) in the New England area, resulting in plants with highly variable leaf shapes and hairy leaf undersides. Hybrids with native holly (L. ilicifolia) have been recorded, the resulting plants having variable hairiness and prickliness. Analysis of chloroplast DNA showed that there is extensive hybridization between the five species (L. arborescens, L. fraseri, L. ilicifolia, L. myricoides and L. silaifolia) of mainland southeastern Australia, though each is distinct enough to warrant species status.

== Distribution and habitat ==
Lomatia fraseri has a disjunct distribution, being found in the New England district of northern New South Wales north to Tenterfield and from Budawang National Park in southern New South Wales into eastern and central Victoria to the Otway Ranges. It is found in rainforest margins in mountainous regions. Often found in gullies in Victoria, it grows more in open woodland and heath in New South Wales.

Lomatia frasieri has been documented as being naturalised in New Zealand.

== Ecology ==
Lomatia fraseri regenerates after bushfire by resprouting from a lignotuber. Fieldwork in the Central Highlands of Victoria predicts populations will be adversely affected by clearfelling and salvage logging after bushfires there.

== Cultivation and uses ==
The marked variation in leaf shape are an interesting horticultural feature. Lomatia fraseri grows in sun or preferably part-shade, benefiting from extra watering when young and from organic mulch. It is moderately frost-tolerant. Propagation is by seed or cutting.

Joseph Maiden reported that its wood was light and hard, and easily worked. It had been used for furniture and window-frames in the 19th century.
