= Robert Hill (botanist) =

Australian botanist (1954-)

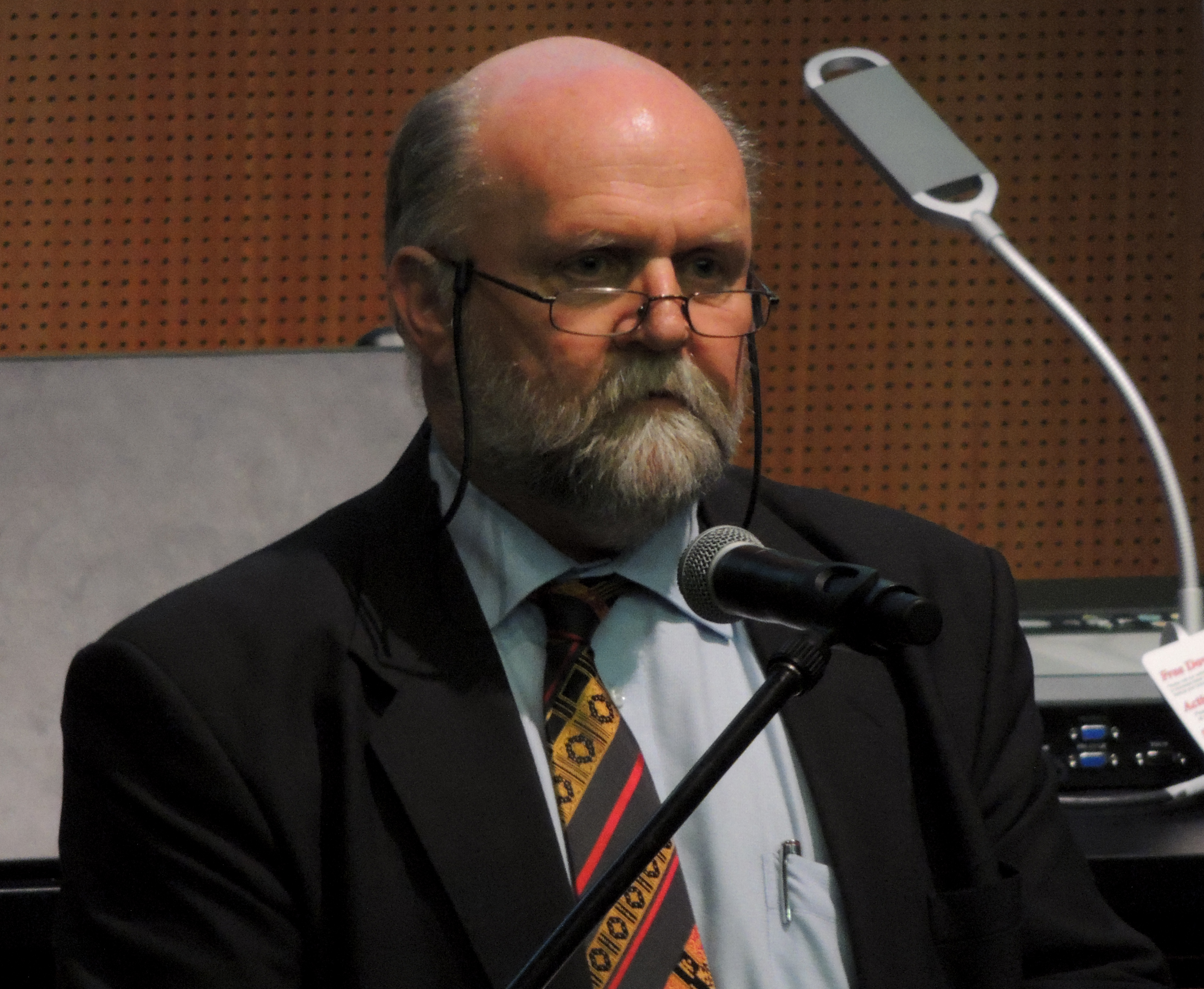
- Hill in 2015
- Born: Robert Stephen Hill; 1954 (age 71–72)
- Education: University of Adelaide
- Occupation: Botanist
- Employer: University of Adelaide

Robert Stephen (Bob) Hill (born 1954) is an Australian botanist. He is best known for his research on the fossil history of the southern beech (Nothofagus) and the southern conifers.

Hill graduated from the University of Adelaide with PhD entitled "The eocene megafossil flora of Nerriga, New South Wales".

As of 2024, Hill is a professor in the School of Biological Sciences at the University of Adelaide.

== Awards ==
- Fellow of the Linnean Society of London 1988
- Clarke Medal (Botany), Royal Society of New South Wales 2002
- Nancy T. Burbidge Medal, Australian Systematic Botany Society 2003

Awards
Preceded by Gordon H. Packham	Clarke Medal; 2002	Succeeded by Lesley Joy Rogers
