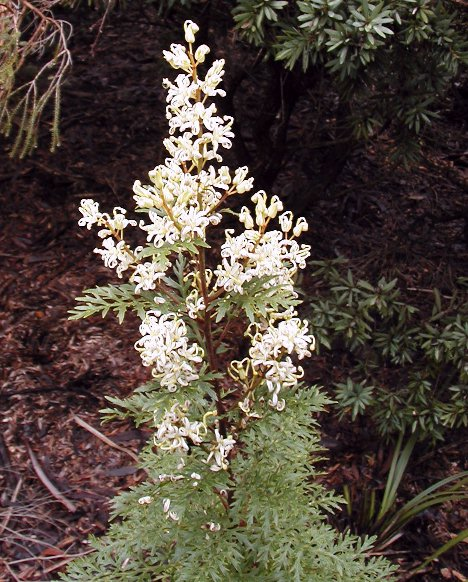
- L. silaifolia

Scientific classification
- Kingdom: Plantae
- Clade: Tracheophytes
- Clade: Angiosperms
- Clade: Eudicots
- Order: Proteales
- Family: Proteaceae
- Subfamily: Grevilleoideae
- Tribe: Embothrieae
- Subtribe: Lomatiinae
- Genus: Lomatia; R.Br.

Species
- See text

Synonyms
- Tricondylus Salisb. ex Knight

= Lomatia =

Genus of flowering plants

Lomatia is a genus of 12 species of evergreen flowering plants in the protea family Proteaceae. Within the family, they have been placed, alone, in their own subtribe, Lomatiinae according to Johnson & Briggs 1975 classification of the family and subsequently in Flora of Australia (1995).

The genus has a Pacific Rim distribution, with members native to eastern Australia and southern South America, forming a part of the Antarctic flora. The species range from prostrate shrubs less than 0.5 m (1 ft 8 in) tall to small trees up to 12 m (39 ft) tall.

Genetic analysis using microsatellite markers showed that species found close together geographically are most closely related to each other. Lomatia dentata, then L. hirsuta and L. ferruginea all diverged successively from the lineage that gave rise to Australian species. The three Tasmanian species (with L. tasmanica sister to the other two species) are sister to the mainland Australian group. L. tasmanica is one of the most endangered species, due to its inability to reproduce sexually. On mainland Australia, the far northern L. fraxinifolia is sister to the other five species, all of which are found in southeastern Australia. L. fraseri and L. myricoides are sister taxa, with L. ilicifolia sister to them, while L. arborescens and L. silaifolia are each other's closest relatives. Strong genomic filters may facilitate continued gene flow between species without the danger of assimilation.

== Species ==
- Lomatia arborescens - eastern Australia
- Lomatia dentata - Chile, Argentina
- Lomatia ferruginea - Chile, Argentina
- Lomatia fraseri - eastern Australia
- Lomatia hirsuta - Chile, Peru, Argentina
- Lomatia milnerae - Queensland
- Lomatia ilicifolia - eastern Australia
- Lomatia myricoides - southeastern Australia
- †Lomatia occidentalis - (Eocene fossil records) Patagonia
- †Lomatia patagonica - (Late Oligocene-Early Miocene (Ñirihuau Formation) fossil records) Patagonia
- †Lomatia preferruginea - (Middle Eocene fossil records (Ventana Formation) Patagonia
- Lomatia polymorpha (mountain guitarplant) - Tasmania
- Lomatia silaifolia - eastern Australia
- Lomatia tasmanica (King's lomatia) - Tasmania
- Lomatia tinctoria (guitarplant) - Tasmania
