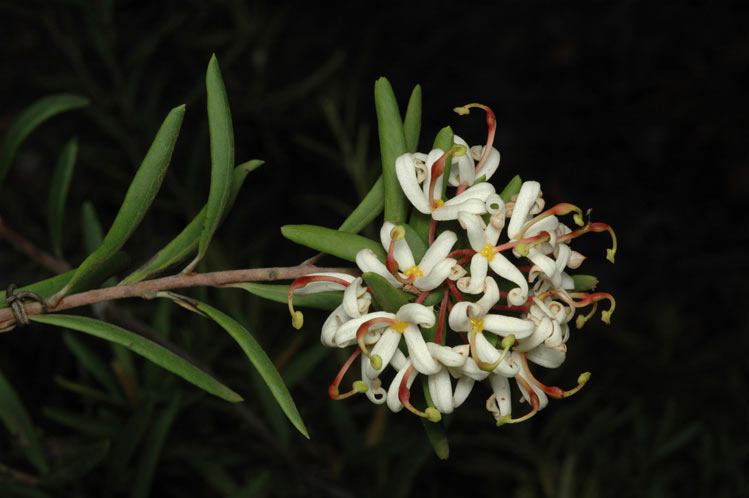

Scientific classification
- Kingdom: Plantae
- Clade: Embryophytes
- Clade: Tracheophytes
- Clade: Spermatophytes
- Clade: Angiosperms
- Clade: Eudicots
- Order: Proteales
- Family: Proteaceae
- Genus: Lomatia
- Species: L. polymorpha

Binomial name
- Lomatia polymorpha R.Br.

= Lomatia polymorpha =

Mountain guitar plant

Species of plant endemic to Tasmania

Lomatia polymorpha, commonly known as mountain guitar plant, is a species of flowering plant in the family Proteaceae which is endemic to Tasmania. It is a shrub or small tree with linear leaves, and white, cream-coloured or greenish flowers. It is common throughout its range which is approximately complementary to that of L. tinctoria in Tasmania.

== Description ==
Lomatia polymorpha is a shrub or small tree which grows to a height of between 2.5 and 4 m (8 and 10 ft). It has simple leaves which are linear to narrow egg-shaped, 20–80 mm (0.8–3 in) long, 2.5–10 mm (0.1–0.4 in) wide, have a stalk about 5 mm (0.2 in) long and sometimes have a few lobes or teeth on the margins. The stems sometimes have a covering of matted hairs while the lower surface of the leaves is covered with rusty-coloured hairs and has a prominent mid-vein. The heads of flowers barely extend beyond the leaves and are white, cream or greenish-white in colour. Flowers appear between January and March and are followed by fruits which are dark grey to black and 20–30 mm (0.8–1 in) long.

== Taxonomy and naming ==
Lomatia polymorpha was first formally described in 1810 by Robert Brown in Transactions of the Linnean Society of London.

== Distribution and habitat ==
Mountain guitar plant is a common and widespread species found "approximately south of the Pieman River and west of the Derwent River" in subalpine woodlands, lowland scrubby vegetation in wetter areas, occasionally in rainforest, from sea level to 1,200 m (4,000 ft). Where the range overlaps with L. tinctoria, (as in the region of Lake St Clair), hybrids often occur.

== Use in horticulture ==
A hardy species in cultivation, L. polymorpha can be grown readily from seeds or cuttings and grows well in most soils and aspects.

== Phytochemical profile ==
Lomatia polymorpha, was subjected to various natural products isolation methods by researchers at The University of Tasmania. Through their comprehensive study they found several different compounds distinct to Proteaceae and common throughout a variety of plants. Three different long chain alcohols were found, tetracosan-1-ol, hexacosan-1-ol and octacosan-1-ol as well as the flavanoids taxifolin and isoquercetin. Other molecules isolated include, 1-O-(p-Coumaroyl)-D-glucose and 1,2,4-trihydroxynaphthalene-1-O-glucoside (THNG). Lomatia polymorpha was found to share several compounds in common with L. tasmanica and L. tinctoria. The three alcohols shared by the relatives is characteristic of the waxiness of their leaves and researchers found that the thinnest leaves between them, of L. polymorhpa, yields the least of these compounds. These non-polar compounds possibly reflect the epicuticular morphology of the species.
