= Hay (disambiguation) =

Hay is dried grass.

Hay or HAY may also refer to:

== Places ==
- Hay, New South Wales, Australia, a town
- Hay Shire, New South Wales
- Hay Island (Queensland), Australia
- Hay Island (Tasmania), Australia
- Hay, Western Australia, a locality
- Hay County, Western Australia
- Hay Land District, Western Australia
- Hay River (Western Australia)
- Hay River (Canada), in Alberta and the Northwest Territories
- Hay Islands, Nunavut, Canada
- Cape Hay, Nunavut, Canada
- Hay Swamp, Ontario, Canada
- Hay, Cornwall, England, a farm
- Hay, Iran, a village in Zanjan Province
- Hay Township, Michigan, United States
- Hay, Washington, United States, an unincorporated community
- Hay River (Wisconsin), United States
- Hay Island (Connecticut), United States
- Hay Creek (disambiguation), all in the United States
- Hay Peak, South Georgia Island
- Mount Hay (disambiguation), in various countries
- -Hay (place name element), common in England
- Hay Bluff, Wales
- Hay Urban District, Wales, a former urban district
- Hay-on-Wye, in Wales on the English-Welsh border

== People ==
- Hay (surname)
- Háy, a Hungarian surname
- Hay (given name)
- Clan Hay, a Scottish clan
- Hay, Armenian for Armenians

== Transportation ==
- Hay Street (disambiguation)
- Hay railway line, New South Wales, Australia
- Hay Railway, an early horse-drawn tramway in Wales
- HAY, FAA airport code for Haycock Airport, Alaska, United States
- HAY, IATA airport code for Hacaritama Airport, Cesar, Colombia
- HAY, National Rail station code for Hayes & Harlington railway station, England

== Other uses ==
- Hay Group, an international human resource consultancy
- Hay baronets, four titles in the Baronetage of Nova Scotia
- "Hay" song, released in 1996 by Crucial Conflict
- He (letter), a Hebrew letter that may be spelled "hay" especially in English-speaking contexts
- HAY (company), a Danish furniture purveyor

== See also ==
- Haytor or Hay Tor, Devon, England, a granite tor
- Hay Hollow, Missouri, United States, a valley
- Hay Grade, a system for job evaluation and grading
- Haye, a village in Cornwall
- Hayes (disambiguation)
- Hays (disambiguation)
- Hey (disambiguation)
- La Haye (disambiguation)
