= Hay Island =

Hay Island may refer to:

- Hay Island (Queensland), Australia
- Hay Island (Tasmania), Australia
- Hay Island (Georgian Bay), Ontario, Canada
- Hay Islands, Nunavut, Canada
- Hay Island, County Fermanagh, a townland in County Fermanagh, Northern Ireland
- Hay Island (Connecticut), United States
