= Swainson =

Swainson is a family name of English origin. It may refer to:

== People ==
- Bill Swainson, English editor and literary consultant
- Charles Swainson (naturalist), (1841–1913), Rector of High Hurst Wood and later of Old Charlton, author of books on birds, weather and folk-lore
- Charles Anthony Swainson (1820–1887), English theologian
- Gina Swainson (born 1958), Bermudan first runner-up in the 1979 Miss Universe contest
- Isaac Swainson (1746–1812), English patent medicine entrepreneur
- John Swainson (1925–1994), American politician
- William Swainson (1789–1855), English naturalist
- William Swainson (lawyer) (1809–1884), English lawyer

== Places ==
- The Swainson Island Group, which includes Swainson Island, Tasmania, Australia

== Biology ==
Birds

- Swainson's flycatcher, Myiarchus swainsoni
- Swainson's francolin, or Francolinus swainsonii
- Swainson's hawk, Buteo swainsoni
- Swainson's sparrow, Passer swainsonii
- Swainson's thrush, Catharus ustulatus
- Swainson's warbler, Limnothlypis swainsonii

Butterflies

- Swainson's crow, Euploea swainson

Plants

- Swainsona, large genus of flowering plants native to Australia
