= Briggs Glacier =

Glacier in South Georgia

- Location within South Georgia Island
- Location: South Georgia
- Coordinates: 54°10′S 37°8′W
- Thickness: unknown
- Terminus: Murray Snowfield
- Status: unknown

Briggs Glacier (54°10′S 37°8′W) is a glacier between Mount Worsley and The Trident in central South Georgia, flowing northwest into Murray Snowfield. It was charted as a glacier flowing into the head of Possession Bay in 1929 by Lieutenant Commander John M. Chaplin, Royal Navy (1888–1977). Chaplin was survey officer aboard RRS Discovery during the Discovery Oceanographic Expedition of 1925–1927, and was later in charge of a hydrographic survey party in South Georgia, 1928–30.

Briggs Glacier was named for Able Seaman A.C. Briggs, one of the crew of RRS Discovery in 1925–27 and a member of Chaplin's survey party in 1928–30. During the South Georgia Survey of 1955–1956, the complicated area of glaciers and snowfields south of Possession Bay was for the first time surveyed in detail, and Briggs Glacier was re-located.

== See also ==
- List of glaciers in the Antarctic
- Glaciology
