= Géza Szőcs =

Hungarian politician (1953–2020)

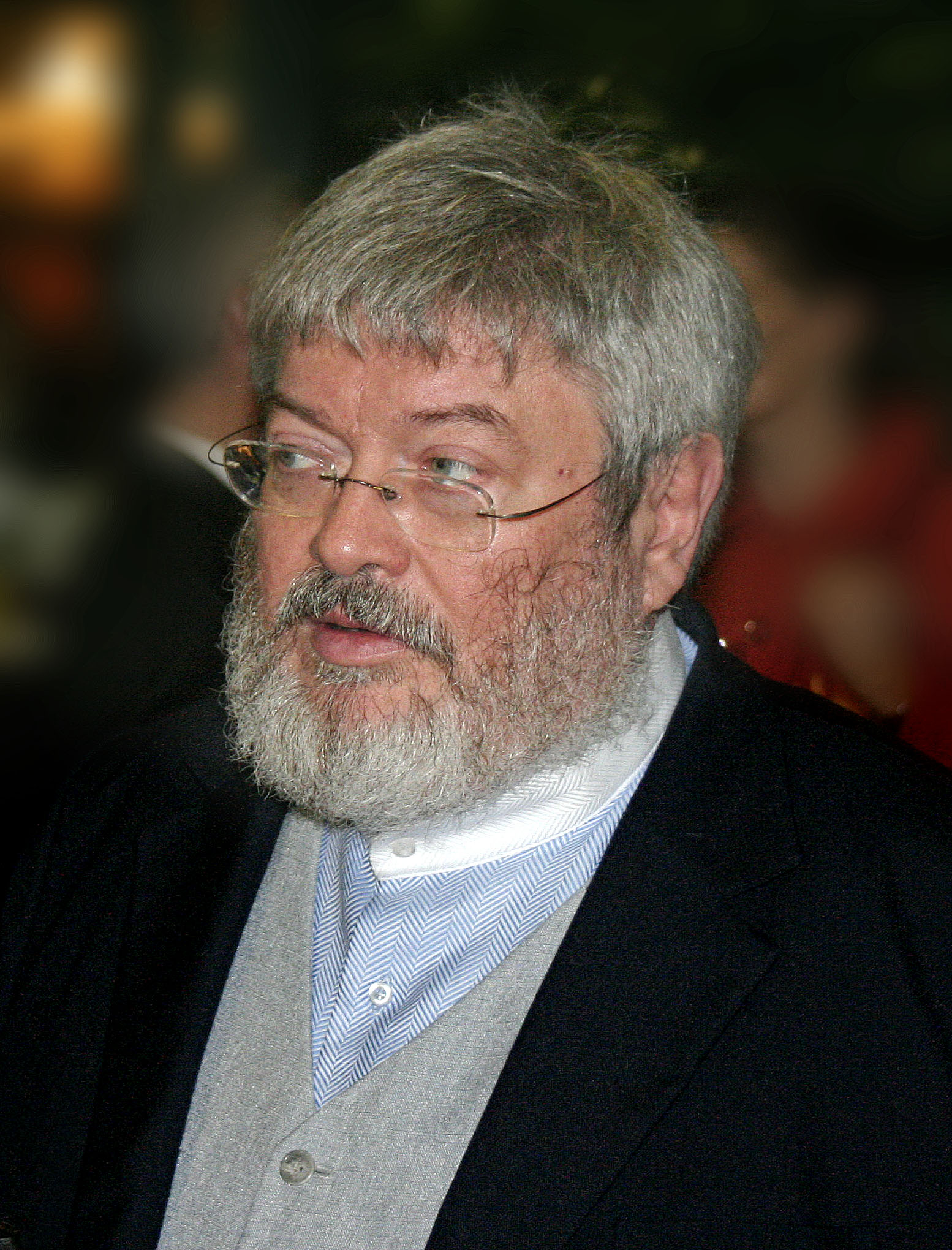
- Géza Szőcs (2011)

Secretary of State for Culture of the Ministry of National Resources
- In office 2 June 2010 – 13 June 2012
- Minister: Miklós Réthelyi; Zoltán Balog
- Succeeded by: László L. Simon

Personal details
- Born: 21 August 1953 Târgu Mureș, People's Republic of Romania
- Died: 5 November 2020 (aged 67) Budapest, Hungary
- Party: RMDSZ
- Profession: poet, politician

Géza Szőcs (21 August 1953 – 5 November 2020) was an ethnic Hungarian poet and politician from Transylvania, Romania, who served as Secretary of State for Culture of the Ministry of National Resources in Hungary from 2 June 2010 to 13 June 2012.

== Life ==
Szőcs was born in Târgu Mureș, Romania. His father was István Szőcs (1928–2020), an ethnic Hungarian writer and translator from Romania. His mother is literary translator Ráchel Márton (b. 1928). He studied until 1979 at the Babeș-Bolyai University of Cluj. On a proposal by András Sütő, he received a scholarship for the 1979–80 semester at the University of Vienna. Szőcs edited the Hungarian-language samizdat Ellenpontok, because of this he was interrogated and abused by Securitate, secret police agency of the Ceaușescu regime.

From 1986 to 1989, after working in the scientific literature seminar of the Babeș-Bolyai University, Géza Szőcs went into political exile in Switzerland, where he worked in Geneva as a journalist. Between 1989 and 1990, he conducted the Budapest studio of Radio Free Europe. In 1989, he joined the staff of the magazine Magyar Napló of the Hungarian Writers' Association.

In 1990, Szőcs returned to Cluj and was active in the Democratic Union of Hungarians in Romania (RMDSZ), for which he sat from 1990 to 1992 in the Romanian Senate. From 1993 to 2010, he was editor of the magazine A Dunánál in Hungary. He was co-editor of the magazine Magyar Szemle and a member of the supervision of the Hungarian state television Magyar Televízió (MTV). Szőcs was a founding member of the Hungarian Civic Cooperation Association since 1996.

In May 2010, he was appointed Hungary's Secretary of State for Culture by Prime Minister Viktor Orbán. In 2011, he was elected president of the Hungarian Pen Club. He resigned from his position in June 2012. He was replaced by László L. Simon. Szőcs became chief cultural adviser to Prime Minister Orbán. In 2013, He was appointed government commissioner for the Hungarian pavilion in Expo 2015. This activity was accompanied by a number of criticisms and scandals. The Hungarian pavilion, the "Shaman drum" cost HUF 2 billion of public funds. The design of the eclectic building received serious criticism. Szőcs was appointed Prime Ministerial Commissioner for Culture in 2018.

== Personal life ==
Géza Szőcs had five children.

Szőcs was infected with COVID-19 in October 2020, during the COVID-19 pandemic in Hungary. He was admitted to a hospital in Budapest, where he was reportedly in serious condition in intensive care. According to Index.hu, Szőcs was on ventilation for weeks. He died on 5 November 2020, of complications from COVID-19.

== Works ==
- Te mentél át a vízen? Bucharest, Kriterion, 1975.
- Kilátótorony és környéke Bucharest, Kriterion, 1977.
- Párbaj, avagy a huszonharmadik hóhullás Cluj-Napoca, 1979.
- A szélnek eresztett bábu Budapest, Magvető Könyvkiadó, 1986.
- Az uniformis látogatása New York City, Hungarian Human Rights Foundation, 1987.
- Kitömött utcák, hegedűk Köln-Budapest, Literarische Briefe/Irodalmi levelek, 1988.
- A sirálybőr cipő Budapest, Magvető, 1989.
- Históriák a küszöb alól Budapest, Szépirodalmi Kiadó, 1990.
- A vendégszerető avagy Szindbád Marienbadban Budapest, Szépirodalmi Könyvkiadó, 1992.
- A kisbereki böszörmények Cluj-Napoca, Erdélyi Híradó, 1995.
- Ki cserélte el a népet? Cluj-Napoca, Erdélyi Híradó, 1996.
- Passió Budapest, Magvető Könyvkiadó, 1999.
- Drámák, hangjátékok Budapest, Kortárs kiadó, 2002.
- A magyar ember és a zombi Budapest, Kortárs Kiadó 2003. ISBN 963-9297-82-8
- Liberté 1956 Budapest, A Dunánál 2006. ISBN 973-7648-07-2
- Limpopo Budapest, Magvető 2007. ISBN 978-963-14-2554-3
- Beszéd a palackból Arad, Irodalmi Jelen Könyvek, 2008.
- Amikor fordul az ezred (Beszélgetőkönyv és dokumentumgyűjtemény; Sz. G. és Farkas Wellmann Endre) Budapest, Ulpius-ház, 2009.
- Nyestbeszéd (Szőcs Géza 33 verse Faludy György válogatásában) Budapest, Ulpius-ház, 2010.
- Tasso Marchini és Dsida Jenő Budapest, Szent István Társulat, 2010.
- La missione di Rasputin-Raszputyin küldetése Novara, Arcipelago Edizioni, ISBN 978-88-7695-510-5

== Awards ==
- 1976 - Writers' Union of Romania Debut Award
- 1986 - Robert Graves Prize
- 1986 - Milán Füst Prize
- 1990 - Book of the Year
- 1992 - Tibor Déry Prize
- 1993 - Gabriel Bethlen Prize
- 1993 - Attila József Prize
- 2006 - Award for Hungarian Art
- 2008 - Writers' Union of Romania's Award for Limpopo
- 2009 - Prize of the European Academy of Vienna

== Sources ==
- MTI ki kicsoda 2009. Szerk. Hermann Péter. Budapest: Magyar Távirati Iroda. 2008. ISBN 978-963-17-8728-3
- Éva Blénesi: Szőcs Géza. Kalligram Kiadó, 2000 ISBN 80-7149-290-6
- William Totok: Minderheiten und Securitate. Halbjahresschrift für südosteuropäische Geschichte, Literatur und Politik, 23. Jg., 1–2, 2011, p. 77-110.

=== Further information ===
- Irodalmi Jelen
- Versek
- Haiku
- 2 vers 1956-ról
- Liberté ’56 c. művéből készült filmváltozat forgatása
- Kortárs magyar írók
- Levélváltás Szőcs Géza államtitkárral a Magyar Nemzeti Múzeumban lecsiszolt hun fibuláról
- Szőcs Géza művei műfordításokban – Bábel Web Antológia
- Konfliktusok során át küzdötte magát az államtitkárságig Szőcs Géza – Origo, 2010. augusztus 16.
