= Saddle Island =

Saddle Island can refer to the following

- Saddle Island, South Orkney Islands
- Saddle Island, South Georgia
- Brutus Island, South Georgia, which was previously referred to as Saddle Island
- Saddle Island, Newfoundland and Labrador
- Saddle Island (Western Australia)
- Saddle Island, the older name of Mota Lava, an island of northern Vanuatu
- Saddle Islands, one of the name for Shengsi Islands off Shanghai
- Te Haupa Island, also known as Saddle Island, in the Auckland Region, New Zealand
