= László L. Simon =

Hungarian writer, poet and politician

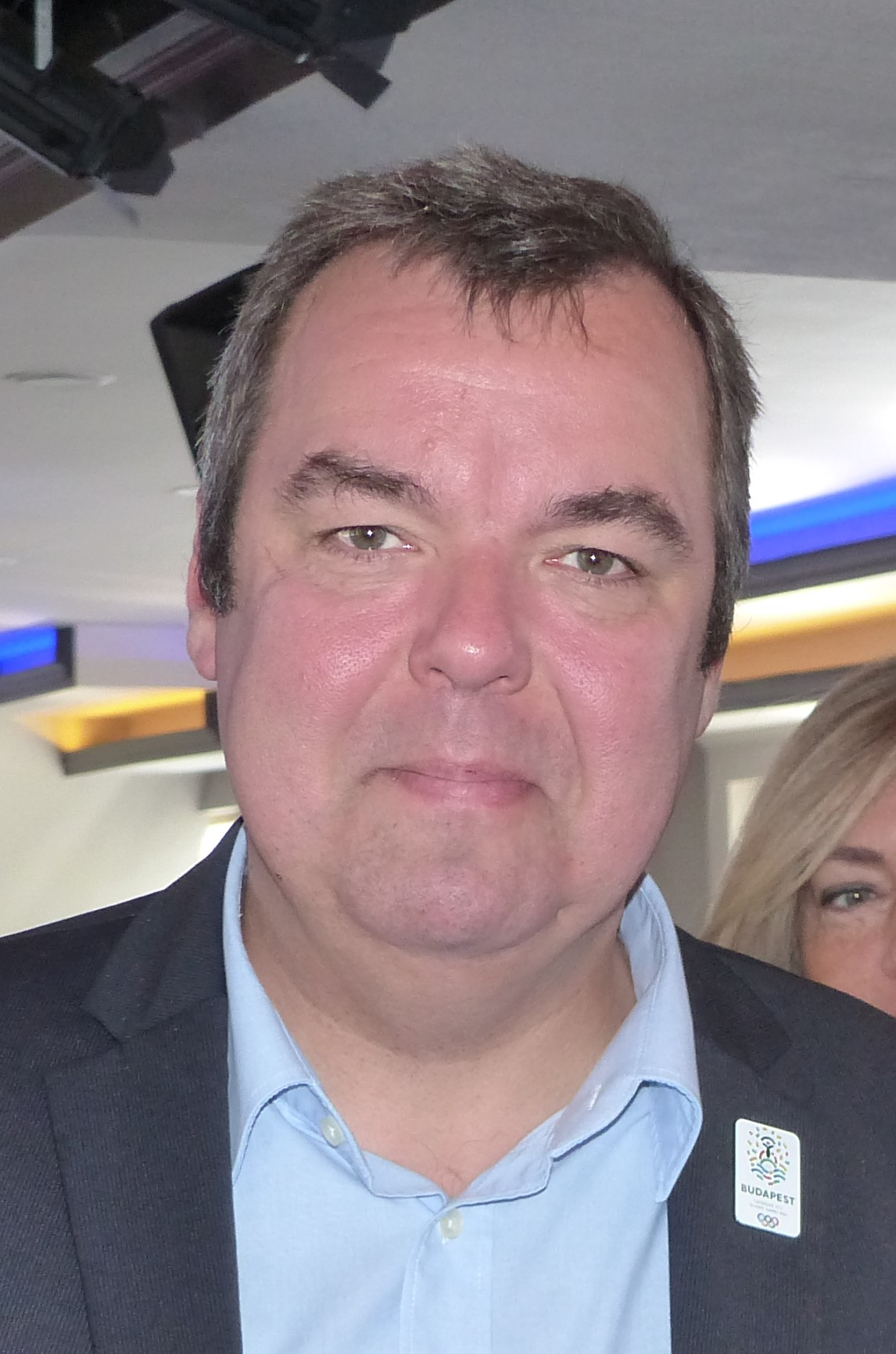

Member of the National Assembly
- In office 14 May 2010 – 29 August 2021

Secretary of State for Culture of the Ministry of Human Resources
- In office 18 June 2012 – 15 February 2013
- Minister: Zoltán Balog
- Preceded by: Géza Szőcs
- Succeeded by: János Halász

Personal details
- Born: 28 March 1972 (age 53); Székesfehérvár, Hungary
- Political party: Fidesz
- Children: Anna Sárosi; Virág Luca Simon; Teréz Emese Simon; Rozália Simon
- Profession: writer, politician

László L. Simon (born 28 March 1972) is a Hungarian writer, poet and politician, who served as Secretary of State for Culture of the Ministry of Human Resources from 18 June 2012 to 15 February 2013.

== Life ==
He finished his secondary studies in the Teleki Blanka Grammar School in Székesfehérvár. He graduated as a history and literature teacher from the Eötvös Loránd University. He was Chairman of the Union of Young Writers between 1998 and 2004. He was the Secretary of the Hungarian Writers' Association from 2004 to 2010. He edited the Magyar Műhely, Kortárs and Kommentár journals. He served as chief editor of the Szépirodalmi Figyelő until 2007.

He served as Chairman of the Committee on Education and Culture in the Fejér County General Assembly. He was elected to the National Assembly of Hungary for Gárdony (Fejér County Constituency IV) as a candidate of the Fidesz. He was Chairman of the Parliamentary Committee on Culture and Press Freedom from 14 May 2010 to 18 June 2012. Miklós Réthelyi appointed him President of the Committee of the Hungarian Cultural Fund on 15 October 2011, replacing Marcell Jankovics. After the resignation of Géza Szőcs, the new minister Zoltán Balog appointed him as Secretary of State for Culture on 18 June 2012. He served for eight months but was replaced due to "habitual differences" with the Minister. L. Simon was elected Chairman of the Committee for Culture and Press Freedom for the second time on 1 March 2013.

From 15 June 2014 to 5 July 2016, he was Secretary of State for Cultural Heritage Protection and Capital Projects within the Prime Minister's Office. He was also Government Commissioner responsible for the renovation of the Buda Castle District and member of the WW1 Centenary Memorial Committee from October 2013. He was dismissed by minister János Lázár.

L. Simon was made Ministerial Commissioner responsible for the renewal of the Hungarian National Museum and the preparation of museum integration on 15 April 2021 with a mandate to 30 April 2022. He was appointed Director-General of the Hungarian National Museum on 31 July 2021. As a result, he resigned from his parliamentary seat.

On 6 November 2023, the Hungarian culture ministry dismissed him "engaging in conduct which made it impossible for him to continue his employment" and for refusing to ban minors from viewing the annual World Press Photo exhibition hosted by the museum which included photographs of LGBT people, calling it a violation of the child protection law against "sexual propaganda". In response, Simon wrote that he took "note of the decision" but could not "accept it", adding that he firmly rejected "the idea that our children should be protected from me or from the institution I run."

== Works ==
- (visszavonhatatlanul…) (Árgus Kiadó – Orpheusz Kiadó, 1996) ISBN 978-963-7971-72-3
- Egy paradigma lehetséges részlete (Magyar Műhely, 1996) ISBN 978-963-7596-22-3
- met AMorf ózis (Orpheusz Kiadó, 2000) ISBN 978-963-9101-67-8
- Secretum sigillum Magyar Műhely Kiadó, 2003. ISBN 978-963-7596-33-9
- Nem lokalizálható (Orpheusz Kiadó - Magyar Műhely Kiadó, 2003.) ISBN 978-963-9377-42-4
- Hidak a Dunán (Ráció Kiadó, 2005) ISBN 978-963-86525-7-7
- Édes szőlő, tüzes bor. A Velencei-tó környékének szőlő- és borkultúrája (with László Lukács and Lajos Ambrus; Ráció Kiadó - Velencei-tó Környékéért Alapítvány, 2005) ISBN 978-963-86525-8-4
- Versenyhátrány. A (kultúr)politika fogságában (Kortárs Kiadó, 2007) ISBN 978-963-9593-59-6
- Háromlábú lovat etető lány (with Tibor Palkó; Ráció Kiadó, 2009) ISBN 978-963-7596-68-1
- Japán hajtás (Kortárs Kiadó – Fiatal Írók Szövetsége, 2008.) ISBN 978-963-9593-76-3
- A római szekér. Kulturális politika – politikai kultúra (Ráció Kiadó, 2010) ISBN 978-963-9605-85-5
- Személyes történelem (Ráció Kiadó, 2011) ISBN 978-615-5047-12-1
- Szubjektív ikonosztáz (Ráció Kiadó, 2012) ISBN 978-615-5047-31-2

== Sources ==
- "L. Simon László". Hungarian National Assembly (in Hungarian).
- "Official website" (in Hungarian).
