= Tibor Déry =

Hungarian writer and poet

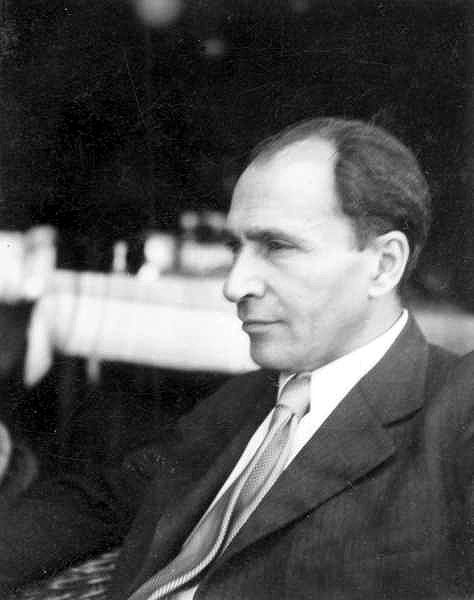
Tibor Déry (c. 1930)

Tibor Déry (18 October 1894 in Budapest – 18 August 1977 in Budapest) was a Hungarian writer and poet. He also wrote under the names Tibor Dániel and Pál Verdes.

György Lukács praised Déry as being "the greatest depicter of human beings of our time".

== Biography ==
He was born to well-off bourgeois parents. His father was a lawyer and his mother came from a wealthy Jewish-Austrian family. In 1911, he graduated from the Budapest Academy of Commerce and spent a year studying German in St. Gallen. From 1913 to 1918, he worked for his uncle, who operated a lumber business, first in Galócás, Transylvania, then in Budapest. At this time, he began writing and managed to publish a few pieces.

After the First World War, he joined the Communist Party. During the brief Hungarian Soviet Republic, he became a member of the Directorate. Following the fall of the Republic, he was arrested, but was released shortly and, in 1920, married Olga Pfeifer. He and his wife emigrated later that year. First, they settled in Vienna, where he worked for the Hungarian language newspaper, Bécsi Magyar Újság. In 1924, they went to Paris then, in 1926, to Perugia, Italy. Although, technically, he returned to Budapest not long after, he spent most of his time traveling. He and Olga were divorced in 1928.

In 1934, he participated in the Austrian Civil War as a member of the Schutzbund, after which, he was forced to flee to Spain. He only returned to Hungary in 1935. Nevertheless, during the right wing Horthy regime he was imprisoned several times, once because he translated André Gide's Retour de l'U.R.S.S.. In this period, he wrote what is often considered his greatest novel, The Unfinished Sentence, a 1,200-page epic story about the life of the young aristocrat, Lőrinc Parcen-Nagy, who gets into contact with the working classes in Budapest during a general strike.

In 1942, after passage of the Jewish Laws, he began writing under various pseudonyms. Following the German occupation, he was forced into hiding. In 1945, he remarried, rejoined the Communist Party and was elected to the leadership of the Hungarian Writers' Union. Over the next few years, many of his previously unpublished works were issued. He divorced and remarried again in 1955.

In 1956, along with György Lukács and Gyula Háy, he was expelled from the Party for criticizing its leadership. In the same year, he wrote Niki: The Story of a Dog, a fable about the arbitrary restrictions on human life in Stalinist Hungary. Later that year, he became a spokesman for the Revolutionary government. When the revolution was quashed, in 1957, he was sentenced to nine years in prison. That sentence was suspended in 1961 and he received a full amnesty in 1963.

After that he divided his time between Budapest and Balatonfüred. Following his death, in 1977, he was the subject of a production on Magyar Televízió. In 1984, a grant from his widow, who died in 1979, was used to establish the Tibor Déry Prize, to honor achievements in literature.
