= Mount Worsley =

Mountain in South Georgia

Mount Worsley (54°11′S 37°9′W) is a mountain, 1,105 m, on the west side of Briggs Glacier in South Georgia. It was surveyed by the South Georgia Survey in the period 1951–57, and named by the United Kingdom Antarctic Place-Names Committee (UK-APC) for Frank Arthur Worsley (1872–1943), skipper of the Endurance on 1914-16 Imperial Trans-Antarctic Expedition. Worsley accompanied Ernest Shackleton in the James Caird from Elephant Island to King Haakon Bay, South Georgia, and made the overland crossing with him to Stromness whaling station.
