= Háy =

Háy is a Hungarian surname. Notable people with the surname include:

- Gyula Háy (1900–1975), Hungarian communist leader
- László Háy (1893–1975), Hungarian economist
- Peter Háy (author) (born 1944), Canadian author, son of Gyula Háy
