= Hay Creek =

Hay Creek may refer to:

== Places ==
- Hay Creek Township, Goodhue County, Minnesota, a township in Minnesota, United States
- Hay Creek Township, Burleigh County, North Dakota, a township in North Dakota, United States
- Hay Creek, Wisconsin, an unincorporated community in Wisconsin, United States

== Waterways ==
- Hay Creek (Beltrami County, Minnesota)
- Hay Creek (Mississippi River), a stream in Minnesota, United States
- Hay Creek (Snake River), a stream in Minnesota, United States
- Hay Creek (Schuylkill River), a river in Pennsylvania, United States
- Hay Creek (Wisconsin), a stream in Sauk County
- Hay Creek (Lake Erie), a watershed administered by the Long Point Region Conservation Authority, that drains into Lake Erie
