= Big Caroline Rock =

Island in Tasmania, Australia

- Location within Tasmania

Geography
- Location: South western Tasmania
- Coordinates: 43°21′36″S 145°54′36″E
- Archipelago: Swainson Islands Group
- Adjacent to: Southern Ocean; Port Davey
- Area: 2.2 ha (5.4 acres)

Administration
- Australia
- State: Tasmania
- Region: South West

Demographics
- Population: Unpopulated

The Big Caroline Rock is an unpopulated island located close to the south-western coast of Tasmania, Australia. Situated near where the mouth of Port Davey meets the Southern Ocean, the 2.2-hectare (5.4-acre) island is part of the Swainson Islands Group, and comprises part of the Southwest National Park and the Tasmanian Wilderness World Heritage Site.

== Fauna ==
The island is part of the Port Davey Islands Important Bird Area, so identified by BirdLife International because of its importance for breeding seabirds. Recorded breeding seabird species are the short-tailed shearwater (15,000 pairs), fairy prion (1-2000 pairs) and silver gull. The Tasmanian tree skink is also present.

== See also ==
- List of islands of Tasmania
