= The Trident =

The Trident (54°10′S 37°5′W) is a ridge surmounted by three peaks, the highest 1,335 m, standing at the east side of Briggs Glacier in South Georgia, South Georgia and the South Sandwich Islands. The name is descriptive of the three peaks and was given by the United Kingdom Antarctic Place-Names Committee (UK-APC) following survey by the SGS in the period 1951–57. The three discrete summits were renamed, from south to north, Mt Thalassa, Mt Poseidon and Mt Tethys, after the first ascents by Mark Dravers, Rodrigo Jordan, David McMeeking, Skip Novak, Nick Putnam and Stephen Venables in 2014. The new names were approved by the Antarctic Place Names Committee and first appeared on the 2018 edition of the 1:200,000 South Georgia map.
