= Mount Hay =

Mount Hay may refer to:

- Mount Hay (New South Wales), Australia
- Mount Hay (Ethiopia)
- Mount Hay (Yakutat), Canada-US border peak, on the border of British Columbia and Alaska

== See also ==
- Hay Peak, South Georgia Island
- Mount Hayes, Alaska
