= Hays =

Hays may refer to:

== People ==
- Hays (surname)

== Places ==
=== United States ===
- Hays (Pittsburgh), a neighborhood in Pittsburgh, Pennsylvania
- Hays, Kansas
  - Fort Hays
  - Hays Regional Airport
- Hays, Kentucky, an unincorporated community in Warren County
- Hays, Montana
- Hays, North Carolina
- Hays, Texas
- Hays County, Texas

=== Elsewhere ===
- Hays, Alberta, Canada
- Hays Reef, Tasmania, Australia
- Hays district, Al-Hudaydah, Yemen

== Schools ==
- Charles Hays Secondary School in Prince Rupert, British Columbia
- Fort Hays State University in Hays, Kansas
- Walter Hays School in Palo Alto, California

== Other uses ==
- Hay's Galleria, a shopping mall and tourist attraction in London
- Hays Code, a set of motion picture industry guidelines
- Hays plc, a British recruitment company
- Hays Travel, a travel agency chain based in Sunderland, England

== See also ==
- Hayes (disambiguation)
- Hay (disambiguation)
- Justice Hays (disambiguation)
