= János Halász (politician) =

Hungarian politician (born 1963)

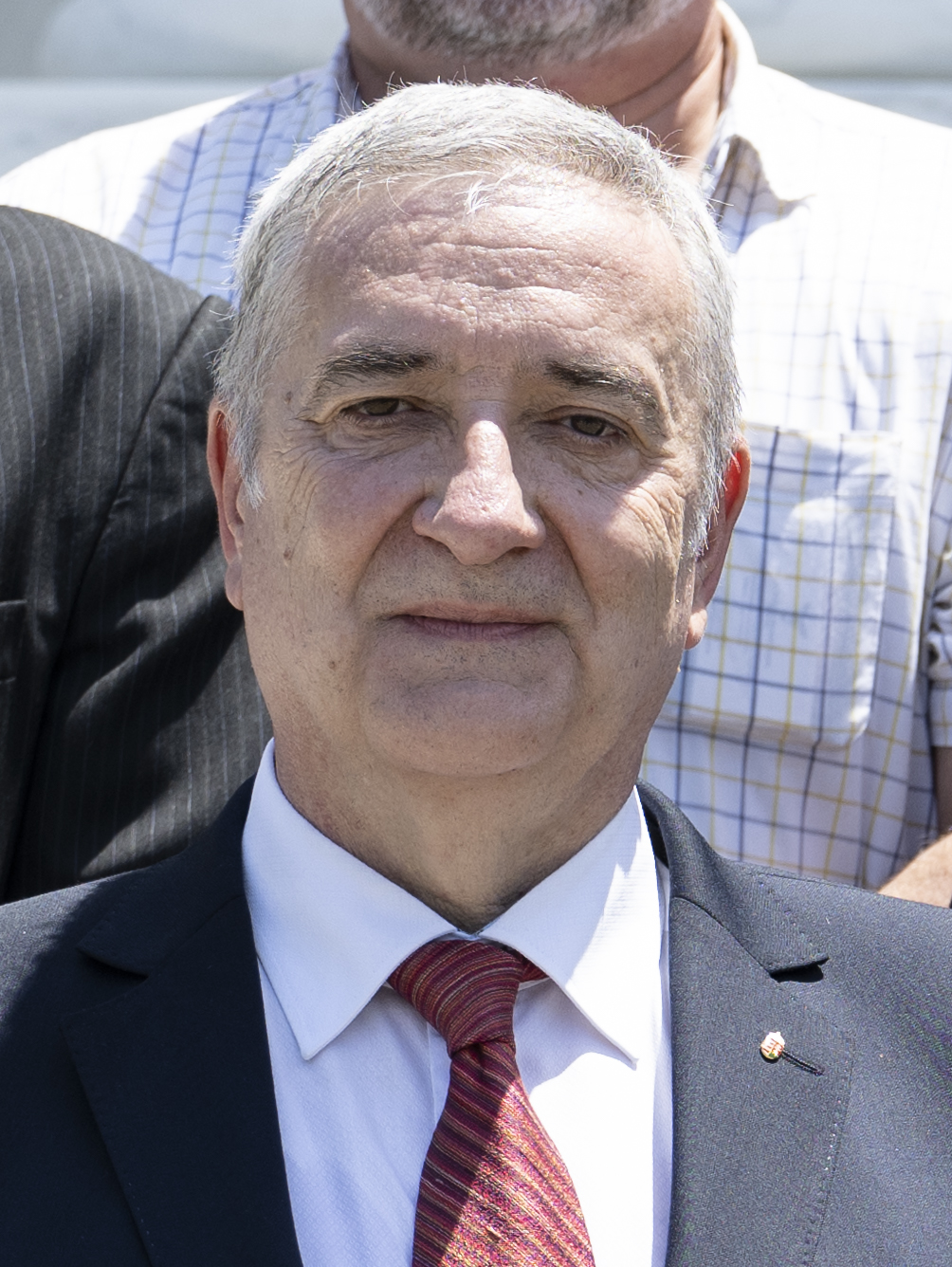
- János Halász in 2025

Secretary of State for Culture of the Ministry of Human Resources
- In office 28 February 2013 – 5 June 2014
- Minister: Zoltán Balog
- Preceded by: László L. Simon
- Succeeded by: Péter Hoppál

Member of the National Assembly
- Incumbent
- Assumed office 18 June 1998

Personal details
- Born: 11 May 1963 (age 62) Cibakháza, Hungary
- Party: Fidesz (since 1998)
- Spouse: Edit Mojzes
- Children: Dániel; Barnabás; Magdolna
- Profession: Politician

János Halász (born 11 May 1963) is a Hungarian politician, member of the National Assembly (MP) for Debrecen (Hajdú-Bihar County Constituency II) between 1998 and 2014. He was elected MP from his party, Fidesz's national list in 2014. He served as Parliamentary State Secretary in the Ministry of Human (formerly National) Resources between 2010 and 2013. He served as State Secretary for Culture between 28 February 2013 and 5 June 2014.

== Biography ==
He finished Móricz Zsigmond Secondary School of Kisújszállás in 1981 after four years of studies. He graduated as a mathematician and cybernetics expert from the Faculty of Natural Sciences of Kossuth Lajos University of Debrecen. He received a certificate for community development from the Hungarian Institute for Culture.

From 1990 to 1993 he worked for and became the head of the Újkert Community House. He was assistant lecturer teaching non-profit management in the Department of Cultural Sciences of the Faculty of Humanities of Kossuth Lajos University of Debrecen from 1993. He was the chairman of the Derecske Town Welfare Service Foundation from 1993 to 2002. In the meantime, he acquired qualification as cultural and adult education manager from Kossuth Lajos University in 1996. He established the first amateur group of the university called Beauty Club in 1986. He was the chairman of the first community radio foundation from 1992 to 1996.

=== Political career ===
He was the member of the Ethics Committee of the National Alliance of Non-profit Human Services from 1997 to 1998. In the 1995 local by-elections he was elected member of the General Assembly of Debrecen. He joined to Fidesz in 1998, he was the chairman of the Ethics Committee of the parliamentary group. After the transformation into a people's party in 2003 he was awarded the chairmanship of the Debrecen constituency.

In the 1998 parliamentary elections, he was elected MP representing Constituency II, Debrecen, Hajdú-Bihar County. He was spokesperson and deputy parliamentary faction leader from February 2000 to January 2002. He was the chairman of the North Plains Regional Youth Council from 2000. He served as Parliamentary State Secretary for national cultural heritage from 1 January to 26 May 2002. He was elected incumbent individual MP for his Debrecen constituency in April 2002. He had been active in the Cultural and Press Committee, of which he was deputy chairman, and in the Committee on Civil Organisations. In the October 2002 local elections he was elected incumbent local representative again in Debrecen, and he was elected deputy mayor responsible for culture and education. Following the party elections of 23 June 2003 he was re-elected deputy parliamentary faction leader, head of the cultural cabinet and parliamentary faction spokesman.

He secured a seat in the Parliament in the 2006 parliamentary elections from 2nd Constituency of Hajdú-Bihar County. He was a member and vice chairman of the Committee on Culture and the Media. Four years later he also won a mandate. He was appointed Parliamentary State Secretary of the Ministry of National Resources in the Second Cabinet of Viktor Orbán on 2 June 2010. He also held the position when Zoltán Balog became minister and restructured and renamed the Ministry. In 2013 he was appointed State Secretary for Culture, replacing László L. Simon.

== Personal life ==
He is married. His wife is Edit Mojzes. They have two sons, Dániel and Barnabás and a daughter, Magdolna.
