= Shanks Islands =

Islands in Tasmania, Australia

- Location within Tasmania

Geography
- Location: South western Tasmania
- Coordinates: 43°20′24″S 145°57′00″E
- Archipelago: Swainson Islands Group
- Adjacent to: Southern Ocean; Port Davey
- Total islands: 5
- Area: 2.72 ha (6.7 acres)

Administration
- Australia
- State: Tasmania
- Region: South West

Demographics
- Population: Unpopulated

The Shanks Islands form a group of five small rocky islets located close to the south-western coast of Tasmania, Australia. Situated near where the mouth of Port Davey meets the Southern Ocean, the islets have a combined area of 2.72 hectares (6.7 acres) and are part of the Swainson Islands Group. They comprise part of the Southwest National Park and the Tasmanian Wilderness World Heritage Site.

== Fauna ==
The islets are part of the Port Davey Islands Important Bird Area, so identified by BirdLife International because of its importance for breeding seabirds. Recorded breeding seabird and wader species are the little penguin, short-tailed shearwater (8,700 pairs), fairy prion (5,000 pairs), silver gull, sooty oystercatcher and Caspian tern.

== See also ==
- List of islands of Tasmania
