= Murray Snowfield =

Snowfield on South Georgia in the South Atlantic Ocean

Murray Snowfield (54°9′S 37°9′W) is a snowfield centered 2 nautical miles (3.7 km) south of Possession Bay in South Georgia. The name "John Murray-Gletscher" was given to a glacier flowing into the head of Possession Bay by members of the Second German Antarctic Expedition, 1911–12. The SGS, 1955–56, reported that there is no true glacier in this position, but that the nearby snowfield requires a name.
