= Lourah Island =

Island in Tasmania, Australia

- Location within Tasmania

Geography
- Location: South western Tasmania
- Coordinates: 43°21′00″S 145°58′48″E
- Archipelago: Swainson Islands Group
- Adjacent to: Port Davey
- Area: 4.86 ha (12.0 acres)

Administration
- Australia
- State: Tasmania
- Region: South West

Demographics
- Population: Unpopulated

Lourah Island is an unpopulated island located close to the south-western coast of Tasmania, Australia. Situated within Port Davey, the 4.86-hectare (12.0-acre) island is part of the Swainson Islands Group, and comprises part of the Southwest National Park and the Tasmanian Wilderness World Heritage Site.

== Fauna ==
The island is part of the Port Davey Islands Important Bird Area, so identified by BirdLife International because of its importance for breeding seabirds. Recorded breeding seabird and wader species are the little penguin and sooty oystercatcher.

== See also ==
- List of islands of Tasmania
