= Saddle Island, South Georgia =

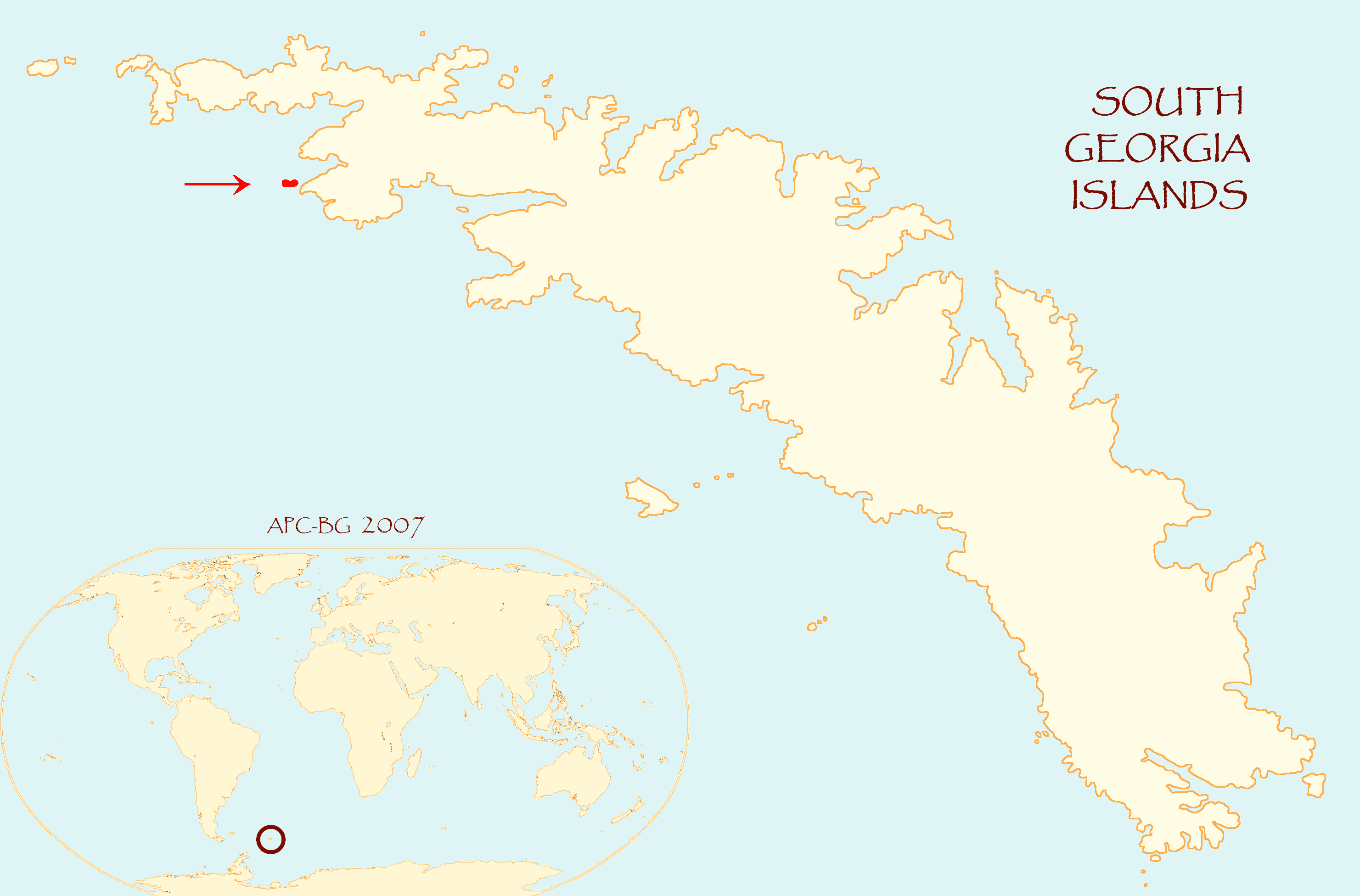
- Location of Saddle Island in South Georgia Islands

Geography
- Location: Southern Ocean
- Coordinates: 54°08′25″S 37°44′57″W
- Archipelago: South Georgia Islands
- Length: 1.98 km (1.23 mi)
- Width: 0.98 km (0.609 mi)

Administration
- United Kingdom

Demographics
- Population: 0

Saddle Island is 1.98 kilometres (1.23 miles) long and 980 metres (1,070 yards) wide, situated on the south side of the entrance to Wilson Harbour on the west coast of South Georgia Island in the Antarctic. The island is separated from the mainland of South Georgia by a 280 metres (310 yards) wide passage.

== Location ==
Saddle Island is located at 54°08′25″S 37°44′57″W, which is 18.9 kilometres (11.7 miles) southeast of Cape Paryadin, 29.1 kilometres (18.1 miles) west of Peggotty Bluff, and 26.3 kilometres (16.3 miles) northwest of Cape Nuñez.

== See also ==
- Composite Antarctic Gazetteer
- List of Antarctic and sub-Antarctic islands
- List of Antarctic islands north of 60° S

== Map ==
- South Georgia. Scale 1:200000 topographic map. DOS 610 Series. Directorate of Overseas Surveys, Tolworth, UK, 1958.
