= Prince Olav Harbour =

Small harbour on north coast of South Georgia, South Atlantic Ocean

Coordinates: 54°4′S 37°9′W

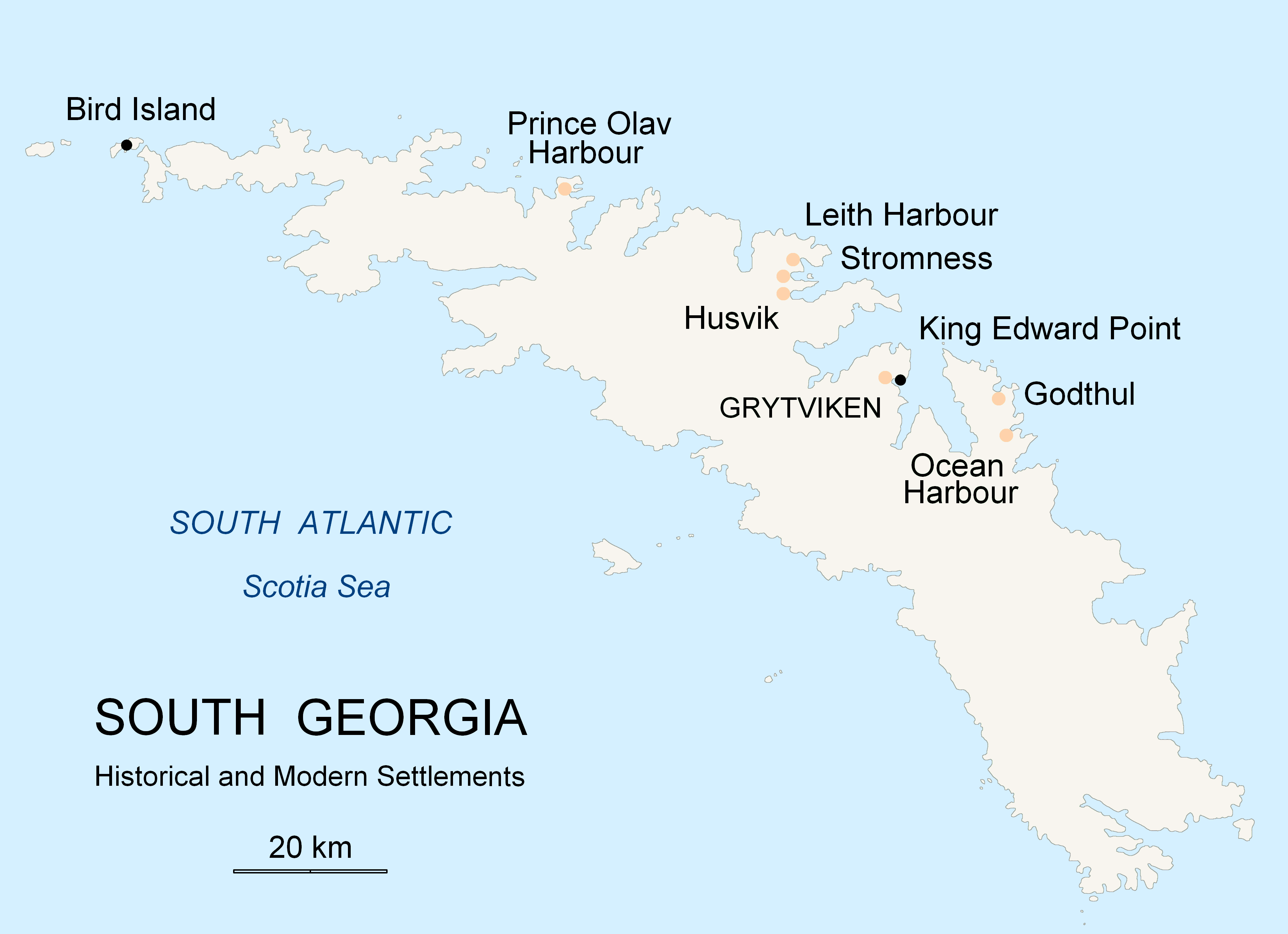
Location of Prince Olav Harbour

Prince Olav Harbour is a small harbour in the south west portion of Cook Bay, entered between Point Abrahamsen and Sheep Point, along the north coast of South Georgia.

== Background ==
Throughout the 19th century, South Georgia was a sealers' base and, in the following century, became a whalers' base. Prince Olav Harbour is the site of one of the seven main whaling bases established on South Georgia. Prince Olav Harbour was the location of a former Norwegian whaling station operational dating from 1911.

== History ==
The whaling station was initially a floating factory site, a shore station being set up in 1916. The whaling station continued as a shore station until March 1931 and then was closed. The name was in use as early as 1912 and was given by Norwegian whalers for Olav V of Norway.

The wreck of the ship Brutus remains, semi-submerged, where she was deliberately beached to serve as a coaling station. The ship was built in Glasgow in 1883 as the Sierra Pedrosa, and measured 1,686 gross registered tons. After serving as a coal hulk at Cape Town, she was towed to South Georgia in about 1912. Brutus Island in the harbour is named after it.

== Named locations ==
Several locations in and around Prince Olav Harbour have been charted and named by various Antarctic survey and exploration groups, primarily by Discovery Investigations (DI) personnel in their 1929–30 expedition. Unless noted otherwise, the following locations were first named by DI personnel.

Point Abrahamsen separates Prince Olav Harbour from Lighthouse Bay on the north side of Prince Olav Harbour. It was probably named for Captain Abrahamsen, manager of the whaling station at Prince Olav Harbour at that time. Southwest of it sits Razor Point, first named on a 1938 British Admiralty chart. Fine Point and Sheer Point are found close by.

Dinghy Point sits on the south side of the harbor. Dinghy Point was originally called "Pram Point", but was renamed Dinghy Point by the UK Antarctic Place-Names Committee in 1991 to avoid duplication with Pram Point at Leith Harbour in Stromness Bay. To the east is the descriptively-named East Bay, 0.5 nmi (0.93 km) mile wide. It was named by the Shackleton–Rowett Expedition, a British expedition under Ernest Shackleton, which visited South Georgia in 1921–22. Squire Point lies at the north side of the entrance to East Bay. The name appears on a 1938 British Admiralty chart.

Sheep Point marks the south entrance to the harbour, separating it from Cook Bay.

Hay Peak sits at the head of the bay. Near the center of the harbour sits Brutus Island.

== See also ==
- History of South Georgia and the South Sandwich Islands
