= Shackleton Gap =

Shackleton Gap (54°8′S 37°12′W) is an ice-covered pass rising to about 300 m between King Haakon Bay and Possession Bay, South Georgia. The name Shackleton's Pass, after Sir Ernest Shackleton, was used on a map in his book the route across South Georgia used by the Shackleton party in 1916. The form approved was recommended by the United Kingdom Antarctic Place-Names Committee (UK-APC) in 1957.
