= Hay Street =

Hay Street may refer to:

- Hay Street, Kalgoorlie, Australia
- Hay Street, Perth, Australia
- Hay Street, Sydney, Australia
- Hay Street, Hertfordshire, a village in England
