= Hay Island (Connecticut) =

American peninsula on the East Coast

Coordinates: 41°02′51″N 73°28′21″W

Hay Island is a small peninsula located off the Darien, Connecticut, shore of Long Island Sound. Its north shore is located on Ziegler's Cove. A small road connects the island with Long Neck Point Road. There are two structures on Hay Island. One was the home of the late William Ziegler III, a founder of the Maritime Aquarium at Norwalk.
