= Hay Creek (Snake River tributary) =

Stream in Kanabec County, Minnesota, U.S.

Coordinates: 46°07′43″N 93°15′08″W

Hay Creek is a stream in Kanabec County, in the U.S. state of Minnesota. It is a tributary of the Snake River.

Hay Creek was named for nearby meadows where hay was produced.

== See also ==
- List of rivers of Minnesota
