= Cook Bay (South Georgia) =

Bay in South Georgia

Cook Bay (54°3′S 37°8′W) is an irregular bay, 1.3 nautical miles (2.4 km) wide at its entrance between Cape Crewe and Black Head, narrowing into two western arms, Lighthouse Bay and Prince Olav Harbour, along the north coast of South Georgia. It was charted by Discovery Investigations (DI) personnel during the period 1926–30, and named by them for Captain James Cook, who explored South Georgia and landed in this general vicinity in 1775.

== Features ==
The following notable features of Cook Bay were named by DI personnel, unless otherwise noted.

Cape Crewe forms the north side of the entrance to Cook Bay. Cape Crewe is an established name, dating back to about 1912. Crewe Rock, an offshore rock about 3 metres (10 ft) high, lies 0.1 nautical miles (0.2 km) east of Cape Crewe, for which it is named. Kelp Bank is a shoal, covered with kelp, lying 2 nautical miles (4 km) northeast of Cape Crewe. The name appears to be first used on a 1931 British Admiralty chart. A small rock group referred to as the Olav Rocks lies 0.6 nmi (1.1 km) east-southeast of Cape Crewe. It was named because the rocks serve as a guide to vessels entering Prince Olav Harbor. DI charts recorded the incorrect spelling, "Prince Olaf Rocks," but later charts corrected this error, and the shortened form of the original name is approved.

Lighthouse Bay forms the northern arm of Cook Bay between Cape Crewe and Point Abrahamsen. It was probably named for the now-disused lighthouse on Sheep Point to the south.

South of Lighthouse Bay, Prince Olav Harbour makes up the majority of Cook Bay.

Further south, a narrow strait called Carl Passage, 0.2 nautical miles (0.4 km) long, connects Elephant Lagoon, which is about 0.3 nautical miles (0.6 km) long, to Cook Bay. "Carl Passage" may reflect an earlier naming.
