= Hay Hollow =

Valley in Missouri, United States

Coordinates: 37.1369934°N 91.3165227°W

Hay Hollow is a valley in Shannon County in the U.S. state of Missouri.

Hay Hollow was named for the production of hay in the area.
