= Hay (given name) =

Hay is a masculine given name and nickname. It may refer to:

- Hay Frederick Donaldson (1856–1916), Australia-born English mechanical engineer and British Army brigadier-general
- Hay MacDowall (died 1809), British Army lieutenant general, General Officer Commanding, Ceylon
- Hay Millar (1883–1944), Canadian ice hockey player
- Hay Petrie (1895–1948), Scottish actor
- Hay Plumb (1883–1960), English actor and film director born Edward Hay-Plumb
- Hay Wilson (died 1925), Anglican priest, Dean of Moray, Ross and Caithness
