= Hay Peak =

Mountain in South Georgia

Hay Peak (54°4.57′S 37°9.95′W) is a peak rising to 660 metres (2,170 ft) at the head of Prince Olav Harbour in Cook Bay, South Georgia. It was charted and descriptively named "The Snow Pap" by the Discovery Investigations in 1929, but subsequently deleted. It was renamed Hay Peak by the UK Antarctic Place-Names Committee in 1990 after Arthur E. Hay of Somerset, England, who was Technical Engineer with the Southern Whaling and Sealing Company at its whaling station at Prince Olav Harbour, 1924–35.
