= Swainson Islands =

Islands in Tasmania, Australia

- Location within Tasmania

Geography
- Location: South western Tasmania
- Coordinates: 43°21′36″S 145°55′12″E
- Adjacent to: Southern Ocean; Port Davey
- Total islands: 5
- Major islands: Lourah Island; Swainson Island; Shanks Islands
- Area: 15.76 ha (38.9 acres)

Administration
- Australia
- State: Tasmania
- Region: South West

Demographics
- Population: Unpopulated

The Swainson Islands are an unpopulated group of five islands and rocks located off the south western coast of Tasmania, Australia. The 15.76-hectare (38.9-acre) group of islands are situated close to the southern end of the western coast of Tasmania, where the mouth of Port Davey meets the Southern Ocean. The Swainson Islands are part of the Southwest National Park and the Tasmanian Wilderness World Heritage Site.

The islands that comprise the group are:

Swainson Islands group locations
Name	Area		Coordinates
Name	ha	acre	Coordinates
Big Caroline Rock	2.19	5.4	43°21′36″S 145°54′36″E
Hay Island	1.85	4.6	43°21′36″S 145°56′55″E
Lourah Island	4.86	12.0	43°21′00″S 145°58′48″E
Shanks Islands	2.72	6.7	43°20′24″S 145°57′00″E
Swainson Island	4.14	10.2	43°21′36″S 145°55′12″E
Total	15.76	38.9	

== Fauna ==
The island group is part of the 163-hectare (400-acre) Port Davey Islands Important Bird Area, identified by BirdLife International because of its importance of supporting more than one percent of the world population of short-tailed shearwater, fairy prion, little penguin and black-faced cormorant.

== See also ==
- List of islands of Tasmania
