= Peter Háy =

Canadian film historian

Peter Háy (born 9 February 1944, in Budapest), the son of Gyula Háy, is the author of over a dozen books, including an anecdote book series for Oxford University Press, a history of MGM (MGM: When the Lion Roars), and Ordinary Heroes: Chana Szenes and the dream of Zion, the story of Hannah Senesh, the Hungarian Jewish poet and heroine of World War II.

He was educated at Haileybury and Imperial Service College near Hertford, England, and read classics and literature at Merton College, Oxford. He emigrated to Canada in 1967 and taught at Simon Fraser University and at Western Washington University in the United States. Before moving to southern California in 1980, he founded the play publishing arm of Talonbooks, a Canadian cultural publisher, and was responsible for publishing the plays of dozens of Canadian playwrights.

After working in the professional theatre world, including as the first dramaturg of the Vancouver Playhouse Theatre Company, he was a dramaturg at the O'Neill Playwrights Conference in Waterford, Connecticut, and at the early Sundance Institute Playwrights Workshops in the early 1980s. While teaching in Los Angeles at USC and UCLA, he, together with Didi Conn, Ethan Phillips, and Virginia Morris, co-founded First Stage, a Hollywood non-profit organization that helps writers develop new scripts for the stage and screen, and for which he holds the title of Founding Artistic Director.

Háy started Book Alley, an antiquarian bookshop in Pasadena, California, with his wife Dorthea Atwater in 1992. He retired to British Columbia in 2008.

== Books ==
- Canned Laughter, Oxford University Press, 1992
- Movie Anecdotes, Oxford University Press, 1991
- MGM: When the Lion Roars, Turner, 1991
- Ordinary Heroes: The Life and Death of Chana Szenes, Israel's National Heroine, Athena (paper), 1989
- Krishnamurti: The Reluctant Messiah, co author with Sydney Field, Paragon House, 1989
- The Book of Business Anecdotes, Oxford University Press, 1988
- The Book of Legal Anecdotes, Oxford University Press, 1987
- All the Presidents' Ladies, Viking Penguin, 1986
- Broadway Anecdotes, Oxford University Press, 1985
- Theatrical Anecdotes, Oxford University Press, 1984
- Ordinary Heroes: Chana Szenes and the dream of Zion, Putnam, 1984

== Translations ==
- The Horse, in Three East European Plays, Penguin, 1970
