= Hay Creek (Beltrami County, Minnesota) =

Stream in Beltrami County, Minnesota, U.S.

Coordinates: 47°53′08″N 94°47′03″W

Hay Creek is a stream in Beltrami County, Minnesota, in the United States.

Hay Creek was so named from the fact early settlers saw haystacks there which had been made by Indians.

== See also ==
- List of rivers of Minnesota
