= Ziegler's Cove =

Geographic feature in Connecticut

Ziegler's Cove is a sheltered haven located on the north shore of Long Island Sound at Darien, Connecticut. Its coordinates are 41.05112°N 73.47128°W The cove is protected to the south by Hay Island (a small peninsula), to the west by Coon Point and Long Neck Point and Great Island to the north. There are also two islands within the cove, Neds Island and smaller, rockier Pine Island. The shoreline of the cove is a mixture of steep granite bluffs, marsh, and coarse sand beaches. The shoreline is privately owned. There is no public access to the shore.

== Recreation ==
The cove is a popular boating destination during the summer and autumn. The scenic shoreline and deep water anchorage attract yachts from Fairfield County, Connecticut and Long Island. Maximum depth at mean low water is approximately 10 ft (3.0 m). Mean tidal range is approximately 7 ft (2.1 m). The town of Darien provides permanent and visitor moorings. Its unpolluted waters are suitable for swimming and fishing.

== Commercial ==
The seabed is designated private oyster ground. Moorings are allowed only with the permission of the owners. Areas of the cove are used for commercial oyster seed production. This comprises a land based nursery and floating structures. Blue point oysters from the Ziegler's Cove seabed are available online through Ned's Island Oysters.
