= Swainson Island =

Island in Tasmania, Australia

- Location within Tasmania

Geography
- Location: South western Tasmania
- Coordinates: 43°21′36″S 145°55′12″E
- Archipelago: Swainson Islands Group
- Adjacent to: Southern Ocean; Port Davey
- Total islands: 2
- Area: 4.14 ha (10.2 acres)

Administration
- Australia
- State: Tasmania
- Region: South West

Demographics
- Population: Unpopulated

Swainson Island is an unpopulated island with an adjacent islet, located close to the south-western coast of Tasmania, Australia. Situated near where the mouth of Port Davey meets the Southern Ocean, the 4.14-hectare (10.2-acre) island is part of the Swainson Islands Group, and comprises part of the Southwest National Park and the Tasmanian Wilderness World Heritage Site.

== Fauna ==
The island is part of the Port Davey Islands Important Bird Area, so identified by BirdLife International because of its importance for breeding seabirds. Recorded breeding seabird and wader species are the little penguin (100 pairs), short-tailed shearwater (38,000 pairs), fairy prion (3000 pairs), Pacific gull and sooty oystercatcher. The Tasmanian tree skink is present.

== See also ==
- List of islands of Tasmania
