= Brutus Island =

Brutus Island (54°4′S 37°9′W) is a small island lying near the center of Prince Olav Harbour on the north coast of South Georgia. The descriptive name Saddle Island was given for this feature, probably by a British expedition under Ernest Shackleton, 1921–22, but the same name is used elsewhere in the Antarctic; to avoid confusion a new name has been approved for this feature. The name Brutus Island, after the hulk Brutus, which was towed across with coal from South Africa by two small catchers and has for many years been moored alongside the whaling station in Prince Olav Harbour, was proposed by Harold Salvesen.

== See also ==
- List of Antarctic and sub-Antarctic islands
