= King Haakon Bay =

Bay in South Georgia

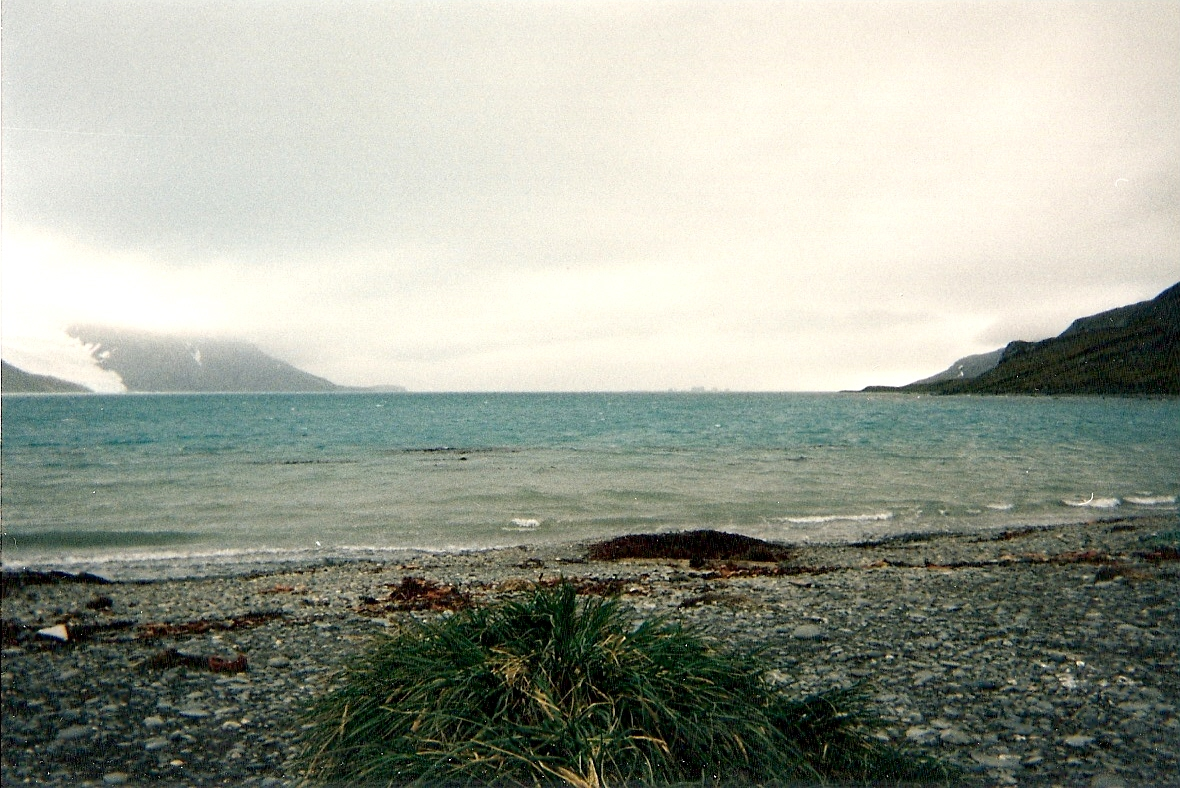

- Location within South Georgia Island
- Coordinates: 54°09′S 37°19′W
- Ocean/sea sources: Scotia Sea
- Islands: South Georgia Island

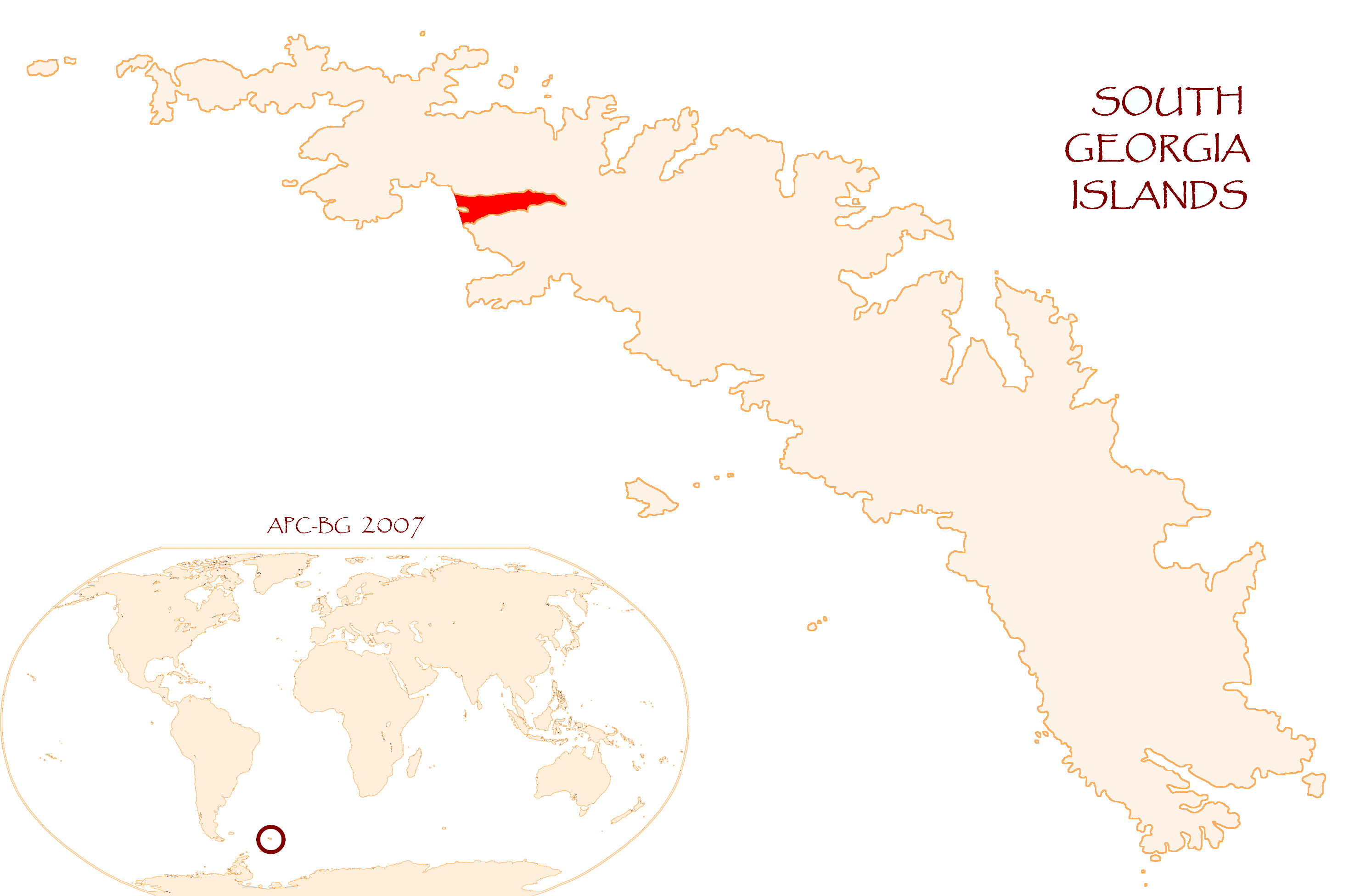
King Haakon Bay

King Haakon Bay, or King Haakon Sound, is an inlet on the southern coast of the island of South Georgia. The inlet is approximately 13 km (8 miles) long and 4 km (2.5 miles) wide. The inlet was named for King Haakon VII of Norway by Carl Anton Larsen, founder of Grytviken. Queen Maud Bay, named for his queen, is nearby. Shackleton Gap, a mountain pass, connects King Haakon Bay to Possession Bay.

Cave Cove, which forms part of the bay, is best known as the landing place of Ernest Shackleton in May 1916 as he sought help for his shipwrecked crew marooned on Elephant Island with the Imperial Trans-Antarctic Expedition. James Caird landed in the cove on 10 May 1916, after its tumultuous voyage from Elephant Island. While at Cave Cove, the men fed on albatross. Henry McNish wrote: "We have not been as comfortable for the last five weeks, We had 3 young & 1 old albatross for lunch with 1 pint of gravy which beets [sic] all the chicken soup I ever tasted." Since they had run out of drinking water arriving at Cave Cove, the men immediately went to the small stream there. They had to leave their boat offshore, and the elements tore the rudder off James Caird. The rudder floated back into the cove later, and thus they were able to repair the boat. From here, they moved to Peggotty Bluff. The voyage is commemorated by a small plaque in the rock at the cove.

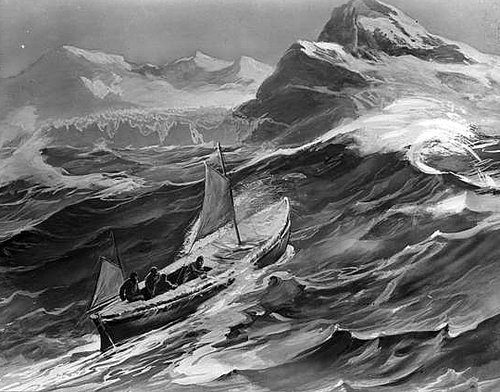
James Caird nearing South Georgia, from Ernest Shackleton's book, South, 1919.

Peggotty Bluff or Peggotty Camp is a bluff near the head of King Haakon Bay on the north side. The party camped at the bluff using the upturned James Caird, They named the camp for the Peggotty family in Charles Dickens' David Copperfield, who lived in a home made from a beached boat. While they were waiting in this location, Henry McNish took screws from the boat and put them in the crew's shoes in order that they could walk across ice more easily.

During the South Georgia Survey, 1955–56, King Haakon Bay was surveyed and the approximate position of the camp deduced. The name Peggotty Bluff was given to the feature now described, which is close to the ITAE campsite.

== See also ==
- List of Antarctic Field Camps
