= Gyula Háy =

Hungarian communist intellectual and playwright

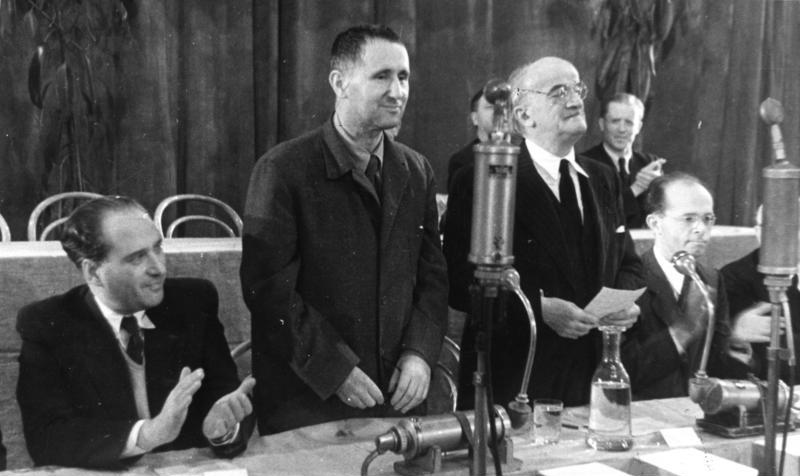
From left to right: Háy, Bertolt Brecht, Ernst Legal, Alexander Abusch in 1948 at a meeting of the Kulturbund

Gyula "Julius" Háy (5 May 1900 – 7 May 1975) was a Hungarian communist intellectual and playwright. He wrote under the pen name Stefan Faber.

== Biography ==
Háy was born in 1900 in Abony, Austria-Hungary to a Jewish family. He was involved in the German communist movement in the 1920s, particularly in agitprop plays. During World War II, he lived for a time in Moscow's Hotel Lux, along with scores of other Communist exiles.

In the 1950s he was a dissident in the Hungarian Writers' Union, and advocated for workers' councils in the months leading up to the Hungarian revolution of 1956. During the revolution, he played a significant role in the Hungarian Writers' Union, as a revolutionary body. He was involved in the workers council movement, and wrote the radio appeal to the intellectuals of the world which was broadcast as the Parliament building fell to Soviet troops.

Háy was arrested and sentenced to 6 years in prison in November 1957. After three and a half years in prison, he was released and a few years later in 1965, left Hungary for Switzerland with his wife Éva where he continued to write plays in the west as an emigré.

He died 1975 in Ascona, Switzerland, two days after his 75th birthday. His son, Peter, is a retired Canadian author, publisher and bookseller.

== Selected works ==
- Tiszazug (1945)
- Isten, császár, paraszt (1946)
- Romok (1947)
- Ítélet éjszakája (1948)
- Az élet hídja (1951–52)
- Erő (1952)
- Gyilkosok tanyáján (1953)
- Öt színdarab (1954)
- Sorsok és harcok (1955)
- Szabadság, szerelem (1955)
- A pulykapásztor (1956)
- Királydrámák (1964)

== Sources ==
- Reményi Gyenes István: Ismerjük őket? Zsidó származású nevezetes magyarok (Ex Libris Kiadó, Budapest, 2000); ISBN 963-85530-3-0
- Háy Gyula: Született 1900-ban; Interart, Budapest, 1990; ISBN 963-01-9976-9
- Háy Éva (Háy Gyuláné, Majoros Éva): A barikád mindkét oldalán (Budapest, Osiris, 2000)
- Ki kicsoda a magyar irodalomban? Könyvkuckó Kiadó, Budapest, 1999; ISBN 963-8157-91-7
