= Hay Island (Tasmania) =

Island in Tasmania, Australia

- Location within Tasmania

Geography
- Location: South western Tasmania
- Coordinates: 43°21′36″S 145°56′24″E
- Archipelago: Swainson Islands Group
- Adjacent to: Southern Ocean; Port Davey
- Area: 1.85 ha (4.6 acres)
- Highest elevation: 78 m (256 ft)

Administration
- Australia
- State: Tasmania
- Region: South West

Demographics
- Population: Unpopulated

The Hay Island is an unpopulated island located close to the south-western coast of Tasmania, Australia. Situated near where the mouth of Port Davey meets the Southern Ocean, the 1.85-hectare (4.6-acre) island with an elevation of 78 metres (256 ft) above sea level, is part of the Swainson Islands Group, and comprises part of the Southwest National Park and the Tasmanian Wilderness World Heritage Site.

== Fauna ==
The island is part of the Port Davey Islands Important Bird Area, so identified by BirdLife International because of its importance for breeding seabirds. Recorded breeding seabird and wader species are the short-tailed shearwater (7500 pairs) and fairy prion (1-2000 pairs).

== See also ==
- List of islands of Tasmania
