= Possession Bay =

Bay in South Georgia

Coordinates: 54°6′S 37°7′W

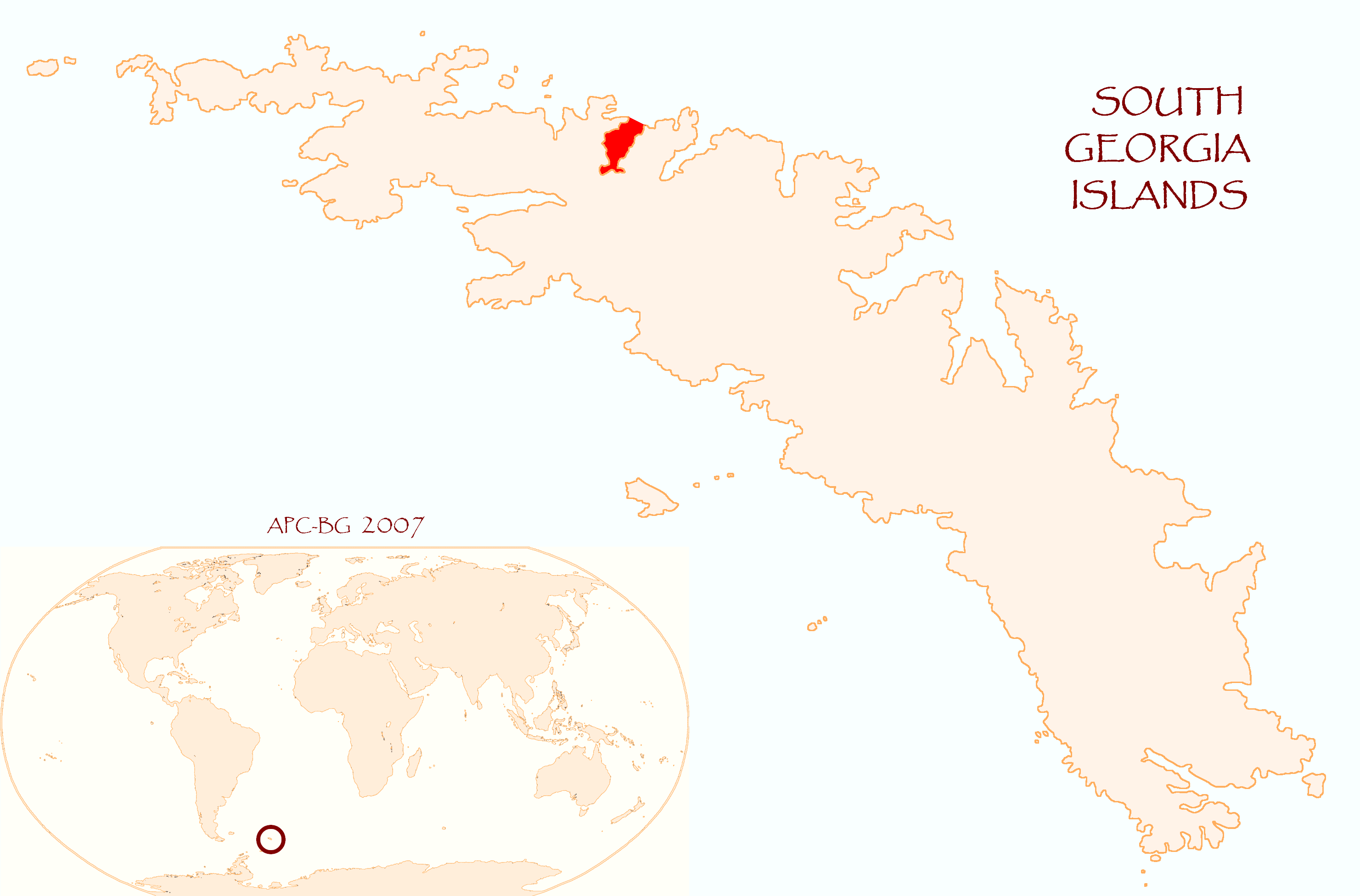
Location of Possession Bay on South Georgia Island

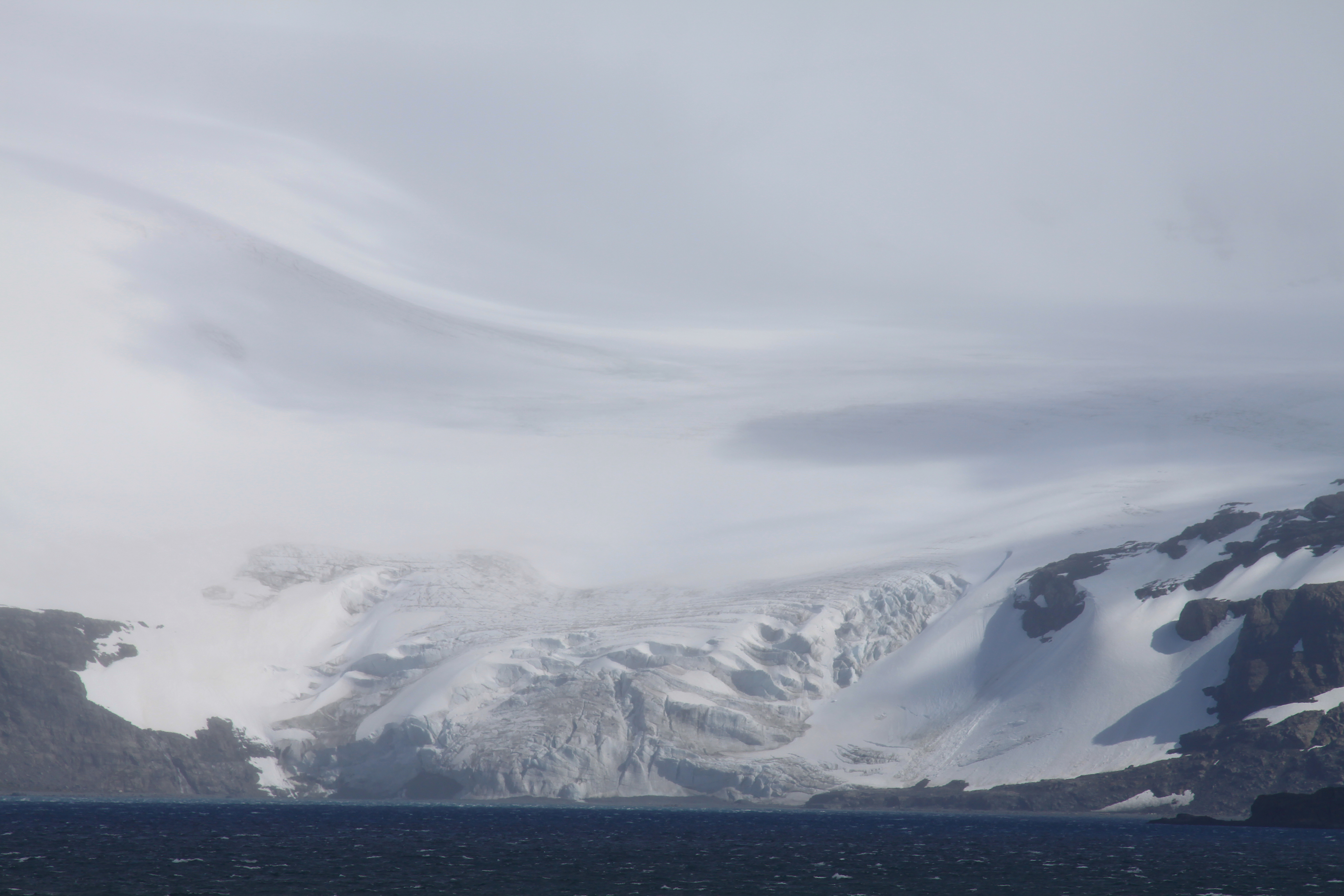
Possession Bay

Possession Bay is a bay 2 miles (3.2 km) wide on the north coast of South Georgia, an island in the southern Atlantic Ocean. It recedes southwest for 5 miles (8 km), and is separated from Cook Bay to the north by Black Head promontory. It is connected to King Haakon Bay by Shackleton Gap, a mountain pass.

== Geography ==
Several features in and around Possession Bay have been charted by various Antarctic expeditions.

Black Head is a dark, rugged promontory, 60 metres (200 ft) high, which separates Possession Bay from Cook Bay, to the north. At the head of the bay, Inner Reef extends from the headland Adventure Point on the west side of the bay to Brown Point on the east side. Just south of Adventure Point is Brighton Beach, which extends to Zero Point. Zero Point sits at the north side of Assistance Bay, a small bay within the larger Possession Bay.

On the east side of the bay, Alert Point marks the mouth of Purvis Glacier. Outer Moraine Reef extends from Alert Point to Steep Point. Brown Point sits between Steep Point and Glacier Point.

The names Inner Reef, Adventure Point, Brown Point, Outer Moraine Reef, Steep Point, and Glacier Point all appear to have first been used on a 1931 British Admiralty chart.

Brighton Beach was named by Discovery Investigations (DI) personnel during their 1926–30 expedition, and derives from the beach being as crowded with fauna as Brighton, a popular seaside resort on the south coast of England. DI personnel named Alert Point for their survey motorboat Alert. The names Zero Point and Black Head appear on charts from the same expedition.

== Cook's Second Voyage ==
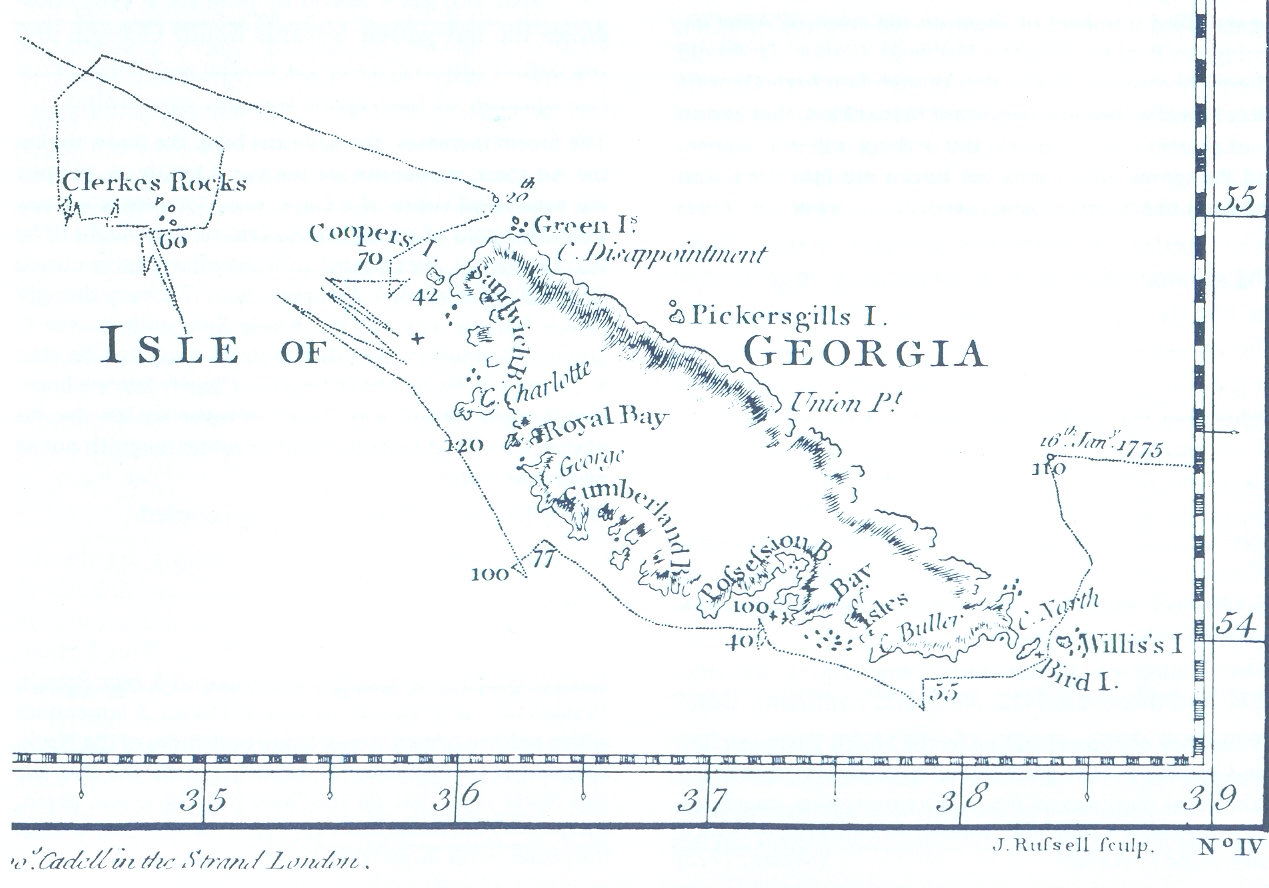
Possession Bay can be seen on Cook's map, which is oriented south-upwards

It was discovered and named by a British expedition under Captain James Cook in 1775. Cook made the first known landing on South Georgia in this vicinity.

In HMS Resolution and accompanied by HMS Adventure, Cook made the first landing, survey and mapping of South Georgia. As mandated by the Admiralty, on 17 January 1775 he took possession for Britain and renamed the island "Isle of Georgia" for King George III. German naturalist Georg Forster, who accompanied Cook during their landings in three separate places at Possession Bay on that day, wrote:

"Here Captain Cook displayed the British flag, and performed the ceremony of taking possession of those barren rocks, in the name of his Britannic Majesty, and his heirs forever. A volley of two or three muskets was fired into the air."

Cook himself wrote in his log:

"The head of the Bay... was terminated by a huge Mass of Snow and ice of vast extent, it shewed a perpendicular clift of considerable height, just like the side or face of an ice isle; pieces were continually breaking from them and floating out to sea. A great fall happened while we were in the Bay; it made a noise like Cannon. The inner parts of the Country was not less savage and horrible... the wild rocks raised their lofty summits until they were lost in the clouds, and the valleys lay buried in everlasting snow. Not a tree was to be seen nor a shrub even big enough to make a tooth-pick."
