= Hay Islands =

Island group in Nunavut, Canada

- Location within Nunavut Location within Canada

Geography
- Location: Northern Canada
- Coordinates: 73°40′N 101°07′W
- Archipelago: Canadian Arctic Archipelago
- Area: 2 km^{2} (0.77 sq mi)

Administration
- Canada
- Territory: Nunavut
- Region: Kitikmeot

Demographics
- Population: Uninhabited

The Hay Islands are members of the Canadian Arctic Archipelago in the territory of Nunavut. They lie offshore of Milne Point, Prince of Wales Island, in the Parry Channel, Viscount Melville Sound. Cowper Point is a distance of 17.5 km (10.9 mi) away.
