= Hungarian Writers' Union =

The Hungarian Writers Union (also known as The Free Union of Hungarian Writers) was founded in 1945 at the end of World War II. Initially the union was intended to be an organizational body through which the interests of writers in Hungary could be represented. It grew to become a major voice of dissension against the Communist regime in Hungary during the 1950s and had a significant role in sparking the Hungarian Revolution of 1956.

== History ==
After the ascension of a communist government in Hungary, the Hungarian Writers Union became a tool through which the communist regime imposed its Stalinist literary policies and propaganda. Its weekly paper, the Irodalmi Újság (Literary Gazette), propagated communist literary works and culture. In the early 1950s, however, the Union's membership shifted to an increasingly less communistic ideology. By 1955, most of the high-ranking members of the Union were non-communists and decided to use the Irodalmi Újság as a means to call for reforms in the Hungarian government. This shift in ideology was instrumental in encouraging several other unions within Hungary to do the same.

== Sparking the revolution ==
On the afternoon of 23 October 1956, approximately 20,000 protesters convened next to the statue of József Bem - a national hero of Poland and Hungary. Péter Veres, President of the Writers’ Union, read a manifesto to the crowd,

We Hungarian writers have formulated the demands of the Hungarian nation in the following seven points:

- We want an independent national policy based on the principles of socialism. Our relations with all countries and with the USSR and the People’s Democracies in the first place, should be regulated on the basis of the principle of equality. We want a review of international treaties and economic agreements in the spirit of equality of rights.
- Minority policies which disturb friendship between the peoples must be abandoned. We want true and sincere friendship with our allies - the USSR and the People’s Democracies. This can be realized on the basis of Leninist principles only.
- The country’s economic position must be clearly stated. We shall not be able to recover after this crisis, unless all workers, peasants and intellectuals can play their proper part in the political, social and economic administration of the country.
- Factories must be run by workers and specialists. The present humiliating system of wages, norms, and social security conditions must be reformed. The trade unions must truly represent the interests of the Hungarian workers.
- Our peasant policy must be put on a new basis. Peasants must be given the right to decide their own future freely. Political and economic conditions to make possible free membership in co-operatives must at last be created. The present system of deliveries to the State and of taxation must be gradually replaced by a system ensuring free socialist production and exchange of goods.
- If these reforms are to be achieved, there must he changes of structure and of personnel in the leadership of the Party and the State. The Rákosi clique, which is seeking restoration, must be removed from our political life. Imre Nagy, a pure and brave Communist who enjoys the confidence of the Hungarian people, and all those who have systematically fought for socialist democracy in recent years, must he given the posts they deserve. At the same time, a resolute stand must be made against all counter-revolutionary attempts and aspirations.
- The evolution of the situation demands that the PPF [Popular People’s Front] should assume the politica lrepresentation of the working strata of Hungarian society. Our electoral system must correspond to the demands of socialist democracy. The people must elect freely and by secret ballot their representatives in Parliament, in the Councils and in all autonomous organs of administration.

Later that day, a large crowd gathered at the Radio Budapest building, which was heavily guarded by the ÁVH. The flash point was reached as a delegation attempting to broadcast their demands was detained and the crowd grew increasingly unruly as rumors spread that the protesters had been shot. Tear gas was thrown from the upper windows and the ÁVH opened fire on the crowd, killing many. The ÁVH tried to re-supply itself by hiding arms inside an ambulance, but the crowd detected the ruse and intercepted it. Hungarian soldiers sent to relieve the ÁVH hesitated and then, tearing the red stars from their caps, sided with the crowd. Provoked by the ÁVH attack, protesters reacted violently. Police cars were set ablaze, guns were seized from military depots and distributed to the masses and symbols of the communist regime were vandalized.

During the night of 23 October, Hungarian Working People's Party Secretary Ernő Gerő requested Soviet military intervention "to suppress a demonstration that was reaching an ever greater and unprecedented scale." The Soviet leadership had formulated contingency plans for intervention in Hungary several months before. By 2 a.m. on 24 October, under orders of the Soviet defence minister, Soviet tanks entered Budapest.

Early that morning, Gyula Háy and the Hungarian Writers' Union broadcast a desperate plea for Western aid in several languages: Via playwright Juilius Hay, "To every writer in the world, to all scientists, to all writers' federations, to all science academies and associations, to the intelligentsia of the world! We ask all of you for help and support; there is but little time! You know the facts, there is no need to give you a special report! Help Hungary! Help the Hungarian writers, scientists, workers, peasants, and our intelligentsia!"

Western aid did not come and the revolt was put down. Although the Writers Union was banned at the end of the revolution, some of its editors emigrated to western Europe and kept the organization alive. The first copy of Irodalmi Újság printed outside of Hungary was published in London on March 15, 1957. In 1962, the Union set up editorial offices in Paris and the last copy of Irodalmi Újság was printed in 1989, 33 years after the Hungarian Revolution.
