= List of defunct airlines of Australia =

This is a list of defunct airlines of Australia.

| Airline | Image | IATA | ICAO | Callsign | Commenced operations | Ceased operations | Notes |
|---|---|---|---|---|---|---|---|
A
| Aboriginal Air Services | | I8 | | | 2000 | 2006 | |
| Ad Astral Aviation | | AT | | | 1986 | 2016 | |
| Adastra Aerial Surveys | | | | | 1944 | 1973 | Founded by Frank William Follett. Acquired by East-West Airlines. Operated de Havilland Fox Moth, Lockheed Hudson, de Havilland Dragonfly, Douglas C-47A |
| Adelaide Airways | | | | | 1935 | 1957 | Formed by the Adelaide Steamship Company. Merged with the Orient Steam Navigation Company and the Union Steam Ship Company of New Zealand Limited in 1936 to form Australian National Airways (ANA) |
| Advance Airlines | | DR | | | 1974 | 1981 | |
| Aero-Tropics Air Services | | HC | ATI | | 1999 | 2008 | |
| Aeropelican | | OT | PEL | PELICAN | 1971 | 2013 | Former staff of Aeropelican went on to establish FlyPelican using the former Aeropelican fleet. Operated Cessna 402, de Havilland Canada DHC-6 Twin Otter, Embraer EMB 110 Bandeirante, Swearingen Metroliner |
| Air Australia | | VC | AGC | STRATEGIC | 2008 | 2012 | Formed as Strategic Airlines. Operated Airbus A320-200, Airbus A330-200 |
| Air Beef | | | | | 1949 | 1962 | Formed as a consortium of Australian National Airways and MacRobertson Miller Airlines to transport beef. Operated Bristol Freighter, Lockheed 10, Douglas DC-3 |
| Air Kangaroo Island | | UV | | | 1990 | 1996 | Operated DHC-6 Twin Otter, Short 330 |
| Air Queensland | | QN | AQN | BUSHAIR | 1981 | 1988 | Absorbed into Australian Airlines |
| Aircrafts [sic] Pty | | | | | 1928 | 1948 | Formed by John Ronald Shafto Adair. Operated Avro Avian, Waco 10, de Havilland DH.60 Moth, de Havilland Hawk Moth |
| Airlines of New South Wales | | WX | | NEWSOUTH | 1959 | 1993 | Absorbed into Ansett |
| Airlines of Northern Australia | | BT | | | 1982 | 1985 | Operated Fokker F27, Fokker F28 |
| Airlines of South Australia | | GJ | | ALSA | 1960 | 1986 | Subsidiary of Ansett Australia |
| Airlines of South Australia | | RT | LRT | | 1987 | 2006 | Independent airline formed by a merger of Lincoln Airlines and Augusta Airways |
| Airlines of Western Australia | | MV | AWA | AIRWA | 1981 | 1984 | Operated Fokker F28 |
| AirSwift Aviation | | | | | 2000 | 2007 | Merged into Skytrans Airlines |
| Airtex Aviation | | | | | 1982 | 2010 | |
| Albatross Airlines | | UX | | | 1979 | 1998 | |
| Ansett Air Freight | | | | | 1989 | 2000 | |
| Ansett Australia | | AN | AAA | ANSETT | 1936 | 2002 | |
| Ansett Express | | WX | NSW | NEWSOUTH | 1959 | 1993 | Operated Aérospatiale N 262, Fokker F28, Fokker 50, DHC-6 Twin Otter |
| Arkaroola | | | | | 1968 | 1973 | Renamed Science Aids. Operated Cessna 206 |
| Asian Express Airlines | | HJ | AXF | | 1996 | 2008 | Renamed from Premier Airlines in 1996 and rebranded as Tasman Cargo Airlines in 2008 |
| Associated Airlines | | | | | 1938 | 2000 | Air services on behalf of Consolidated Zinc and BHP. Operated de Havilland Heron, Grumman Gulfstream |
| Augusta Airways | | BH | | | 1983 | 1998 | Acquired Lincoln Airlines and renamed Airlines of South Australia. Operated Aero Commander 500 |
| Aus-Air | | NO | AUS | AUS-AIR | 1956 | 1999 | |
| Australia Asia Airlines | | IM | AAU | AUSTASIA | 1990 | 1996 | Subsidiary of Qantas |
| Australian Air Charterers | | | | | 1956 | 1982 | Renamed Aus-Air. Operated Piper Navajo, Piper Apache, Piper Twin Comanche, Piper Cherokee Six |
| Australian airExpress | | XM | XME | QANTAS | 1992 | 2013 | |
| Australian Airlines (1986-1993) | | TN | AUS | AUSTRALIAN | 1986 | 1993 | Operated Airbus A300B4, Airbus A320, Boeing 727, Boeing 737-300, BAe Jetstream 31, DHC Dash 8 Douglas DC-9 |
| Australian Airlines | | AO | AUZ | AUSTRALIAN | 2002 | 2006 | Subsidiary of Qantas |
| Australian National Airways | | | | | 1930 | 1931 | |
| Australian National Airways (ANA) | | | | | 1936 | 1957 | Sold to Ansett Airways and they merged to form Ansett-ANA |
| Australian Regional Airlines of Queensland | | | | | 1988 | 1993 | Was a subsidiary of Australian Airlines. Operated DHC Dash 8, DHC-6 Twin Otter, Fokker F27 |
B
| BackpackersXpress | | | | | 2005 | | Not launched |
| Bonza | | AB | BNZ | BONZA | 2023 | 2024 | Operated Boeing 737-8 |
| Brindabella Airlines | | FQ | BRI | BRINDABELLA | 1994 | 2013 | |
| British Commonwealth Pacific Airlines | | | | | 1946 | 1954 | Taken over by Qantas |
| Bush Pilots Airways | | QN | AQN | BUSHAIR | 1951 | 1981 | Became BPA then renamed Air Queensland in 1981 |
| Butler Air Transport | | | | | 1934 | 1959 | Absorbed into Ansett as Airlines of New South Wales |
C
| Carnarvon Air Taxis | | | | | 1963 | 1979 | Renamed Skywest Airlines |
| Charter Cruise Air | | | | | 1983 | 1994 | Renamed Aircruising Australia. Operated Fokker F27 Friendship |
| Coastal Airways | | | | | 1962 | 1984 | Absorbed into Ansett |
| Commodore Airlines | | | | | 1979 | 1985 | Operated Short 360 |
| Compass Airlines | | YM | CYM | COMPAIR | 1990 | 1991 | Operated Airbus A300-600, Airbus A310-200 |
| Compass Airlines MkII | | YM | CYM | | 1992 | 1993 | Formed as Southern Cross Airlines, and purchased the name and "goodwill" of the original Compass Airlines (Australia). Operated McDonnell Douglas MD-80#MD-82, McDonnell Douglas MD-80#MD-83 |
| Connair (Australia) | | CK | | | 1970 | 1979 | Established as Connellan Airways in 1943. Renamed Northern Airlines. Operated Douglas DC-3 |
| Connellan Airways | | CX | | | 1939 | 1980 | Acquired by East-West-Airlines |
D
E
| East-West Airlines | | EW | EWA | EASTWEST | 1947 | 1993 | Absorbed into Ansett |
| Eastland Air | | DK | ELA | | 1991 | 2003 | |
| Emu Airways | | TL | | | 1970 | 2005 | |
F
| Flight West | | YC | FWQ | UNITY | 1987 | 2001 | Sold to Queensland Aviation Holdings |
| Flinders Island Airways | | | | | 1932 | 1933 | Merged with Holyman's Airways to form Tasmanian Aerial Services |
| Fly Corporate | | FC | | | 2016 | 2020 | Rebranded as Link Airways |
G
| Global Air | | | GAG | GLOBAL AIRGROUP | 1997 | 2005 | Operated Boeing 747SP |
| Golden Eagle Airlines | | | | | | | |
| Great Western Aviation | | | | | 1998 | 2006 | |
| Guinea Airways | | | | | 1927 | 1959 | Renamed Airlines of South Australia. Operated de Havilland DH.37, Airco DH.9, Junkers W 34, de Havilland DH.60 Moth, Westland Widgeon, Junkers F 13, de Havilland Fox Moth |
H
| Hart Aircraft Service | | | | | 1929 | 1938 | Sold to Victorian & Interstate Airways |
| Hazelton Airlines | | ZL | HZL | HAZELTON | 1953 | 2001 | Acquired by Australiawide Airlines and merged with Kendell Airlines to form Rex Airlines |
| Holden's Air Transport | | | | | 1928 | 1936 | Founded by Les Holden. Operated de Havilland DH.60 Moth, de Havilland Giant Moth, Avro Avian |
| Holyman's Airways | | | | | 1934 | 1936 | Merged with Adelaide Airways and West Australian Airways to form Australian National Airways |
| Horizon Airlines | | BN | HZA | HORIZ AIR | 1999 | 2004 | Established as International Aviation in 1998. Acquired by Macair Airlines. Operated Hawker Siddeley HS 748, Short Skyvan, Swearingen Metroliner |
I
| Impulse Airlines | | VQ | IPU | IMPULSE | 1992 | 2004 | Absorbed into QantasLink, Operated Beechcraft C99, Beechcraft 1900D, British Aerospace Jetstream 41, Hawker Siddeley HS 748, Boeing 717 |
| Inland Pacific Air | | | | | 1993 | 2007 | Acquired by Skytrans Airlines. Operated DHC-6 Twin Otter, Swearingen Merlin II |
| IPEC | | IN | IPA | | 1976 | 1993 | Renamed Independent Air Freighters |
J
| Janami Air | | | | | 1982 | 1999 | Merged into Aboriginal Air Services. Operated Cessna Grand Caravan |
| Jetcraft Air Cargo | | | JCC | JETCRAFT | 1989 | 2008 | Renamed Toll Priority. Operated Fairchild Metroliner |
| JetGo | | JG | JGO | JETGO | 2011 | 2018 | |
K
| Kendell Airlines | | KD | KDA | KENDELL | 1971 | 2002 | Acquired by Australiawide Airlines and merged with Hazelton Airlines to form Rex Airlines |
L
| Lincoln Airlines | | RT | LRT | | 1987 | 1998 | Renamed Augusta Airways. Operated Embraer Bandeirante |
| Lip-Air | | | | | 1997 | 1999 | Renamed Aero-Tropics Air Services. Operated Aero Commander 500 |
| Lloyd Aviation | . | | | QUEENSLAND | 1969 | 1990 | Operated Embraer Bandeirante, Mohawk 298, Fokker F28-4000, Cessna 500, CASA C-212, Short 330 |
M
| MacAir Airlines | | CC | MCK | MACAIR | 1996 | 2009 | |
| MacRobertson Miller Airlines (MMA) | | MV | | MILLER | 1927 | 1981 | In 1963 became a division of Ansett Transport Industries and was renamed MacRobertson Miller Airline Services. Renamed Airlines of Western Australia in 1981. |
| McKinlay Air Charter | | | | | 1992 | 2000 | Renamed MacAir Airlines in May 1998 |
| Murray Valley Airlines | | | | | 1979 | 1986 | Operated Short 360, Piper Chieftain |
N
| National Jet Systems | | NC | NJS | | 1990 | 2009 | Renamed Cobham Aviation Services Australia |
| New England Airways | | | | | 1931 | 1935 | Floated as Airlines of Australia in 1935 |
| Newcastle Aviation | | | | | 1994 | 1995 | Acquired by Pel-Air |
| Ngaanyatjarra Air | | | | | 1982 | 1999 | Merged into Aboriginal Air Services. Operated Cessna 208 Caravan |
| Ngurratjuta Air | | | | | 1987 | 1999 | Merged into Aboriginal Air Services. Operated Cessna 208 Caravan, Cessna 210 |
| Noosa Air | | OF | | | 1975 | 1983 | Established as Whitaker Pty in 1970. Merged into Sunstate Airlines |
| Norfolk Air | | N5 | NFK | NORFIK AIR | 2006 | 2011 | |
| Norfolk Airlines | | UG | NIA | | 1988 | 1991 | Established as Norfolk Island Airlines |
| Norfolk Island Airlines | | UG | NIA | | 1973 | 1992 | |
| Norfolk Island Airlines | | | | | 2017 | 2018 | Used Nauru Airlines aircraft |
| Norfolk Jet Express | | YE | | | 1997 | 2005 | |
| North Queensland Airways | | | | | 1936 | 1938 | |
| Northern Airlines | | | | | 1979 | 1981 | Established as Connair in 1970 |
O
| O'Connor Airlines | | UQ | OCM | OCONNOR | 1973 | 2007 | |
| Oxley Airlines | | VQ | | | 1974 | 1994 | Founded by Brian Peel. Acquired by Impulse Airlines. Operated Beech King Air, Beech 99, Beech 1900, Embraer Bandeirante, Piper Navajo |
| OzJet | | O7 | OZJ | AUSJET | 2005 | 2012 | |
P
| Pacific Air Express | | PE | PAQ | SOLPAC | 1993 | 2021 | |
| Premiair Aviation | | | | | 1967 | 1982 | Founded by Don Kendell. Renamed Kendell Airlines |
| Premier Airlines | | | | | 1994 | 1996 | Renamed Asian Express Airlines. Operated Boeing 727-100 on behalf of DHL Aviation |
| Promair | | | | | 1989 | 1993 | Operated Piper Navajo |
| PY Air | | | | | 1982 | 1999 | Merged into Aboriginal Air Services. Operated Embraer Bandeirante |
Q
| Qantas Empire Airways | | | | | 1934 | 1967 | Renamed Qantas |
| Queensland Airlines | | | | | 1949 | 1958 | Acquired by Ansett. Operated Handley Page Dart Herald, Piaggio P.166 |
| Queensland Pacific Airlines | | | | | 1988 | 1991 | |
| Queensland Pacific Airways | | | | | 1971 | 1972 | Absorbed by Bush Pilots Airways |
| Queensland Regional Airlines | | Q7 | | | 2003 | 2007 | |
| Qwestair | | | | | 1989 | 1995 | Subsidiary of Pel-Air. Operated Beech Super King Air |
R
| Regional Pacific Airlines | | QT | | | 2001 | 2010 | |
| RegionalLink Airlines | | | | | 2004 | 2006 | Formed by the merger of Emu Airways and Airnorth |
| Rossair | | RF | | | 1982 | 1988 | Merged with Airnorth and Tillair to form Air North International |
| Rossair Charter | | | RFS | | 1963 | 2017 | |
S
| Seaplane Safaris | | | | | 2004 | 2006 | Merged with Sydney Harbour Seaplanes and Southern Cross Seaplane to form Sydney Seaplanes. Operated DHC-2 Beaver, Cessna 185 |
| Seawing Airways | | | | | 2004 | 2006 | Operated DHC-2 Beaver |
| Singleton Air Services | | | | | 1980 | 1988 | Founded by Paul Rees. Renamed Yanda Airlines. Operated Cessna 402 |
| SkyAirWorld | | S9 | SYW | SKY AIR | 2006 | 2009 | |
| Skymaster Air Services | | | | | 2007 | 2010 | Operated Piper PA-31P-350 Mojave |
| Skyport | | | | | 1975 | 1993 | Integrated into Airnorth |
| Skytrans Regional | | Q6 | SKP | | 2007 | 2015 | Peter Collings and Johnathan Thurston re-launched Skytrans |
| Skywest Airlines | | XR | OZW | | 1980 | 2013 | Established as Carnarvon Air Taxis in 1963. Rebranded as Virgin Australia Regional Airlines |
| Slingair Heliworks | | | | | 1984 | 2013 | Renamed Aviair |
| Somerset Airways | | | | | 1950 | 1963 | Taken over by Bush Pilots Airways. Operated Auster J-1N Alpha, Beech Bonanza |
| Southern Australia Airlines | | | | | 1992 | 2002 | Established in 1981 as Sunstate Airlines. Merged into Qantas. Operated BAe 146 |
| Southern Cross Airlines | | | | | 1992 | 1993 | Renamed Compass Airlines (Australia) prior to starting operations. Refer to Compass Airlines MkII (Australia) for operated fleet. |
| Southern Cross Airways | | YK | | | 1978 | 1982 | Established as Air Charter Tours in 1970. Operated Beech Queen Air, Cessna 402 |
| Southern Pacific Regional Airlines | | | | | 1991 | 1993 | Operated Frakes Mohawk |
| Stillwell Airlines | | | | | 1937 | 1942 | Established as Civil Flying Services in 1960. Acquired by Skywest Airlines (Australia). Operated Fairchild Metroliner |
| Sungold Airlines | | | | | 1986 | 1989 | Acquired by Queensland Pacific Airlines. Operated BN-2 Islander, Partenavia P.68 |
| Sunshine Express Airlines | | CQ | EXL | | 1998 | 2006 | Ceased all scheduled operations. Charter only. |
| Survey & Inland Transportation | | | | | 1939 | 1943 | Founded by Edward Connellan. Renamed Connellan Airways |
| Sydney Harbour Seaplanes | | | | | 1993 | 2006 | Took over Aquatic Air. To Sydney Seaplanes. Operated DHC-2 Beaver |
T
| Tamair | | GG | TMR | | 1950 | 1998 | Established as Tamworth Air Taxi Service in 1949. Renamed Eastern Australia Airlines. Operated Piper Chieftain, Cessna 310, Cessna 152 |
| Tasair | | TA | | | 1998 | 2012 | |
| Tasmanian Aerial Services | | | | | 1933 | 1933 | Formed by the merger of Flinders Island Airways and Holyman's Airways |
| Tasmanian Airways | | | | | 1926 | 1935 | |
| Tigerair Australia | | TT | TGG | TIGOZ | 2007 | 2020 | Acquired in stages by Virgin Australia Holdings between 2012 and 2014. Brand retired in 2020. |
| Tillair | | | | | 1983 | 1988 | Merged with Airnorth and Tillair to form Air North International |
| Trans Australia Airlines | | TN | TAA | TRANSAIR | 1946 | 1994 | Rebranded as Australian Airlines in 1986. Acquired by Qantas in 1992. Brand retired. |
| Trans Regional Airlines | | | | | 1982 | 1982 | Operated Embraer Bandeirante |
| Trans-West Air Charter | | | | | 1967 | 1979 | Renamed Transwest Airlines. Operated BN-2 Islander, Beech King Air, De Havilland DHA-3 Drover, Piper Apache |
| Transair | | JT | | | 2002 | 2006 | |
| Transtate Airlines | | | | | 1996 | 2000 | Operated Embraer Bandeirante, DHC-6 Twin Otter |
| Transwest Airlines | | | | | 1979 | 1982 | Established as Trans-West Air Charter in 1967. Acquired by Skywest Airlines (Australia). Operated BN-2 Islander, Beech King Air, Beech Baron, Cessnas |
U
V
| V Australia | | VA | VAU | VEE-OZ | 2009 | 2011 | |
| Vincent Aviation Australia | | BF | VIN | | 2004 | 2014 | |
W
| West Australian Airways | | | | | 1921 | 1936 | Purchased by Adelaide Airways |
| Whitaker Pty | | | | | 1970 | 1975 | Renamed Noosa Air |
X
Y
| Yanda Airlines | | YE | | | 1988 | 2001 | |

== See also ==
- List of airlines of Australia
- List of airports in Australia

== Bibliography ==
- Affleck, A. H. (1964). The wandering years. Longmans, Green and Co. Ltd.
- Brogden, S. (1960). The history of Australian aviation. Melbourne: The Hawthorn Press.
- McGrath, Tony (2020). In Western Skies: A Brief History of Commercial Aviation in Western Australia - The First Hundred Years. Carlisle, WA: Hesperian Press. ISBN 9780859058216.
- Airline history of Australia. Kogarah: Aironautica.
