= Two Airlines Policy =

Australian anti-competitive rule

The Two Airlines Policy (or Two Airlines Agreement) was a policy of the Government of Australia from the late 1940s to the 1990s. Under the policy, only two airlines were allowed to operate flights between state capital cities and between capitals and nominated regional centres. The Two Airlines Policy was a legal barrier to new entrants to the Australian aviation market. It restricted intercapital services to the two major domestic carriers. This anti-competitive arrangement ensured that they carried approximately the same number of passengers, charged the same fares and had similar fleet sizes and equipment.

For most of the period of the policy, the two airlines were the privately owned Ansett Airlines and the government-owned Trans Australia Airlines. Though persisting for some decades, the policy finally fell into abeyance with airline deregulation in Australia in 1990.

== Beginnings ==
The First and Second Chifley (Labor) ministries established Trans Australia Airlines (TAA) in 1946, after passing legislation establishing TAA in 1945. TAA was initially intended to be a monopoly national carrier, subsuming all the routes flown by Australian National Airways and any other non-government airlines. This was successfully challenged in two High Court cases.

== Formal establishment ==
The Two Airlines Policy was formulated by the Fifth Menzies Ministry with the Civil Aviation Agreement Act 1952 taking effect. The policy took practical effect when Ansett purchased the failing Australian National Airways in 1957, resulting in it being the only competitor for the government-owned TAA.

While smaller regional airlines were free to operate flights between regional airports and between cities and regional centres, the policy allowed only two airlines to operate flights between major cities in Australia. This led to some minor intrusions by other airlines, for example in 1970, East-West Airlines briefly operated between Sydney and Melbourne by linking a longstanding Sydney to Albury service with a newly added Albury to Melbourne sector, thereby including a nominal number of through passengers at lower than normal fares. Another aspect of the policy was that scheduled flights on the same routes would take off about five minutes apart, with Ansett taking off before TAA.

== Continuation of the duopoly ==
The failing Australian National Airways was taken over in 1957 by Ansett. Subsequent governments continued to allow TAA and Ansett to hold a duopoly over domestic flights in Australia for almost four decades until the deregulation of the industry which resulted in Compass Airlines, Impulse Airlines and Virgin Australia to compete from 1990. It was formerly disbanded on 30 October 1990.

In 1966, interstate courier company Ipec began operating interstate flights carrying freight from Brisbane to Cowra to connect with trucks to and from Melbourne. This was deemed in breach of the law and the service ceased. In 1981, freight services were removed from Two Airlines Policy to allow Ipec to operate services between the mainland and Tasmania.
