= Airservices Australia v Canadian Airlines International Ltd =

Judgement of the High Court of Australia

- Court: High Court of Australia
- Full case name: Airservices Australia v Canadian Airlines International Ltd
- Decided: 2 December 1999
- Citation: (1999) 202 CLR 133

Case history
- Prior action: none
- Subsequent action: none

Court membership
- Judges sitting: Gleeson CJ, Gaudron, McHugh, Gummow, Kirby, Hayne and Callinan JJ

Case opinions
- (5:2) The fee imposed under the Civil Aviation Act 1988 was not a tax (per Gleeson CJ, McHugh, Gummow and Hayne JJ)

Airservices Australia v Canadian Airlines International Ltd (1999) 202 CLR 133 is a High Court of Australia case that affirms previous High Court definitions of a tax.

== Facts ==
Between December 1990 and December 1991 Compass Airlines Pty Ltd ("Compass") carried on business as an Australian domestic airline. The business failed, and in December 1991 Compass went into provisional liquidation. The aircraft operated by Compass were leased from Canadian Airlines International Ltd.

At the relevant time, the Civil Aviation Act 1988 contained provisions relating to the imposition of charges for services and facilities provided to airline operators. The legislation also created a statutory lien over aircraft to secure payment of such charges. At the time Compass went into provisional liquidation, it owed the Civil Aviation Authority (CAA, later "Airservices Australia") substantial amounts in respect of charges and penalties payable in respect of the operations of each of the leased aircraft. The CAA invoked its statutory liens. Each respondent paid, under protest, the charges and penalties claimed to be owing in respect of each aircraft. Upon receipt of those payments, the CAA discharged the liens it asserted. The amounts were paid pursuant to agreements which entitled the respondents to recover the moneys, together with interest, if it were to be held that, as against the respondents, the liens did not validly secure payment of the charges, or for any reason the liens, or the charges, or both, were, in whole or in part, illegal, void or unenforceable.

In the Federal Court Canadian Airlines successfully contended that the charges contravened section 67 of the Act, in that they amounted to taxation. Airservices Australia appealed the decision.

== Decision ==
The High Court held there was no discernible relationship between Airservices Australia and the services received by Canadian Airlines. The method of calculation meant the amount paid by Canadian Airlines was not in proportion to their use of the services. Expert testimony said that the method of calculation to establish the payments owed was the best possible allocation. As a consequence the court decided it was a fee and not a tax.

The court held that there has to be a discernible relationship between the fee paid and the service provided, though they relaxed the requirement somewhat because the fee paid by Canadian Airlines was not in proportion to their use of services. There was however, a bona fide attempt to recover the costs, and it was the only way to spread the cost among the spectrum of airlines and users. Ultimately there is no need for actual correlation between services used and the charge imposed.

== See also ==
- Constitutional basis of taxation in Australia
- Australian constitutional law
