= Scone Aerodrome =

Scone Aerodrome may refer to:

- Perth Airport (Scotland), an airport near the Scottish city of Perth, situated in village of Scone
- Scone Airport, an airport serving the town of Scone in the Australian state of New South Wales
