= 2017 Sydney Seaplanes DHC-2 crash =

2017 aviation accident in Australia

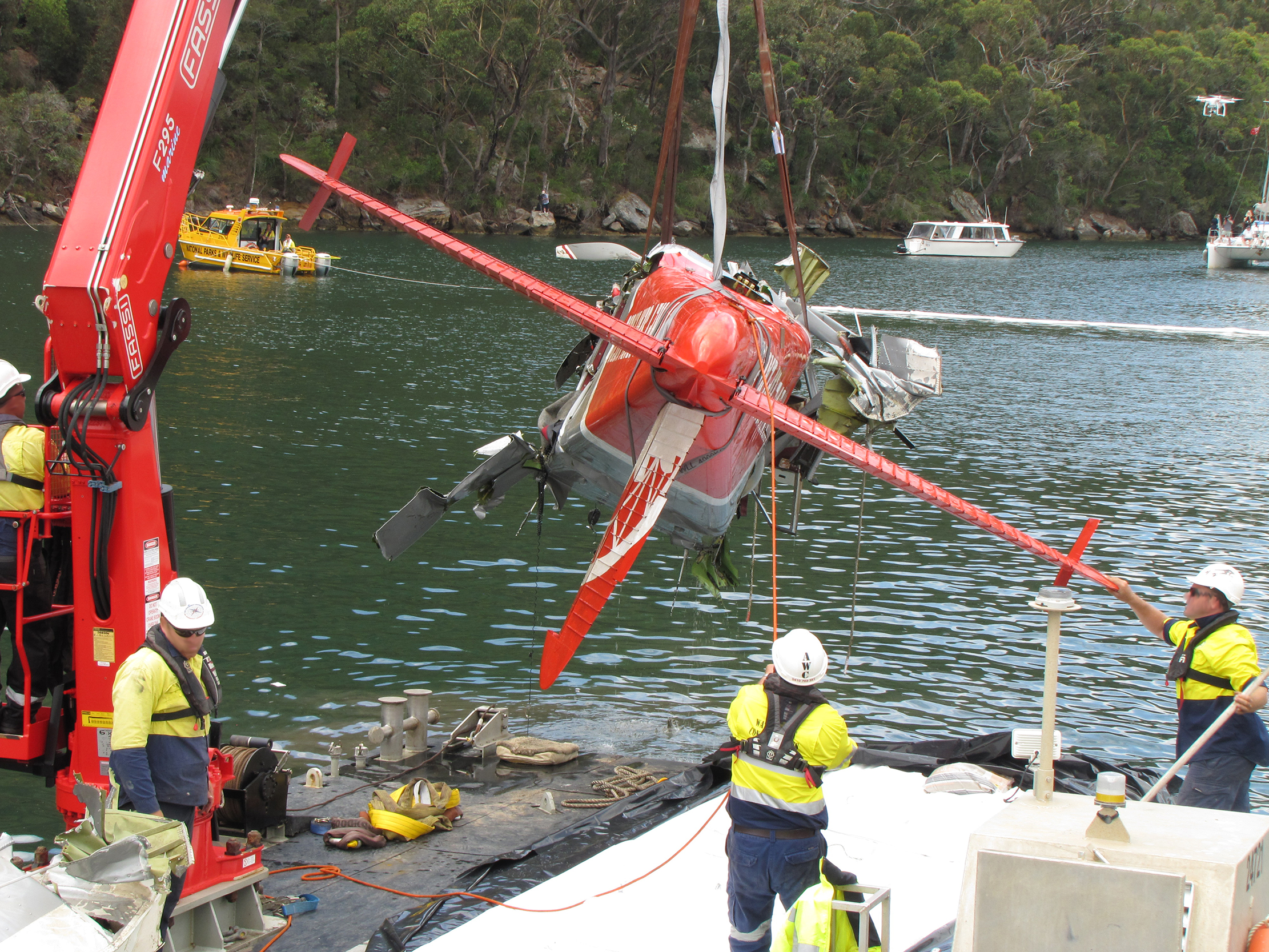
- Wreckage of the aircraft being recovered

Accident
- Date: 31 December 2017
- Summary: Loss of control following pilot incapacitation
- Site: Cowan Creek; 33.590°S 151.193°E

Aircraft
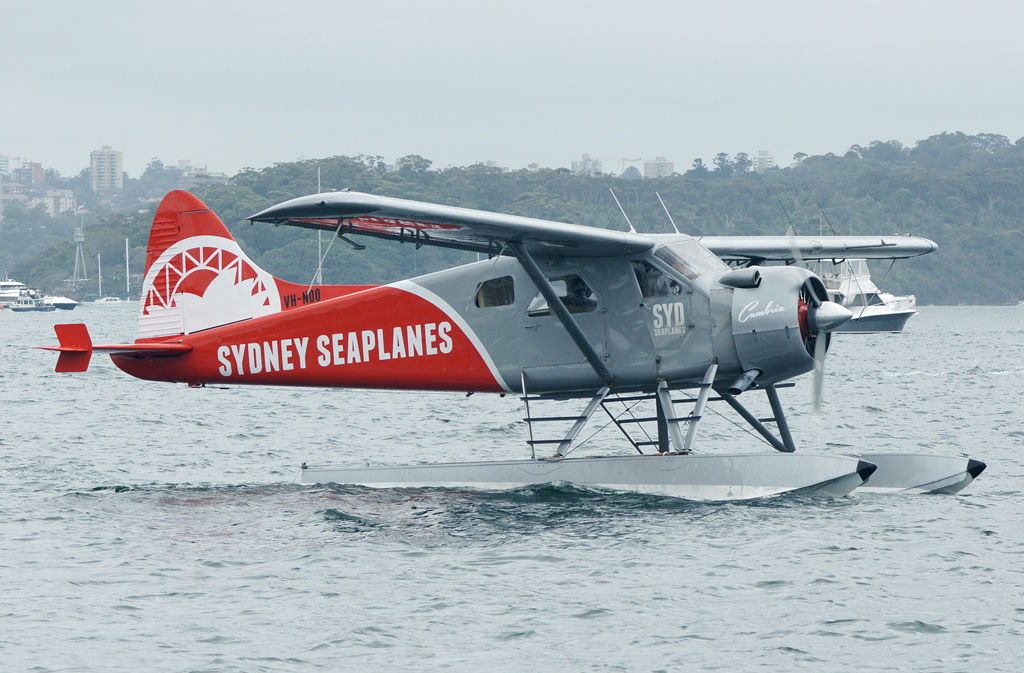
- VH-NOO, the aircraft involved in the accident, seen in January 2017
- Aircraft type: de Havilland Canada DHC-2 Beaver
- Aircraft name: Cambria
- Operator: Sydney Seaplanes
- Registration: VH-NOO
- Flight origin: Cottage Point, New South Wales
- Destination: Rose Bay Water Airport
- Occupants: 6
- Passengers: 5
- Crew: 1
- Fatalities: 6
- Survivors: 0

The 2017 Sydney Seaplanes DHC-2 crash occurred on 31 December 2017 at about 3:15 pm AEDT (UTC+11:00), when a de Havilland Canada DHC-2 Beaver configured as a floatplane crashed – less than two minutes after takeoff – into Jerusalem Bay off Cowan Creek, on the northern outskirts of Sydney, Australia. The aircraft, operated by Sydney Seaplanes, was carrying five passengers and a pilot, all of whom were killed in the crash. It was returning diners from Cottage Point Inn restaurant to Rose Bay Water Airport. The ATSB believes it probable that the pilot's performance was adversely affected by carbon monoxide poisoning. Post mortem tests on the bodies of the victims showed raised levels of CO in the blood, and a crack in the exhaust system was seen as the likely source of the gas.

== Aircraft ==
The aircraft was a 54-year-old de Havilland Canada DHC-2 Beaver, originally built in 1963 and registered in Australia since February 1964; it was powered by a single Pratt & Whitney R-985 Wasp Junior engine.

In 1996, the aircraft was destroyed in a crash while working as a crop duster near Armidale, New South Wales, killing the pilot. The aircraft was then completely rebuilt; the Civil Aviation Safety Authority confirmed that it had been repaired according to industry requirements.

== Victims ==
The Canadian-Australian pilot, Gareth Morgan (44) and five British tourists – Richard Cousins (58), CEO of British foodservice company Compass Group, his two sons, his fiancée and her daughter – were killed in the crash.

== Investigation ==
The Australian Transport Safety Bureau (ATSB) opened an investigation into the accident. Most of the wreckage of the aircraft was raised on 4 January 2018. The intermediate report, published on 31 January 2018, indicated that the aircraft was found to have followed a differing flight path from the usual, and had failed to climb to the necessary altitude needed to fly over the surrounding terrain. It also indicated that the preliminary examination of aircraft flight control surfaces and controls seemed in sound order and expected positions, and that the engine sounded normal to witnesses on the ground. The aircraft landed inverted and all six on board suffered fatal injuries.

On 28 January 2021, the ATSB released a final report into the accident, which concluded that the pilot and passengers had higher than normal levels of carboxyhaemoglobin in their blood. Additionally, several pre-existing cracks in the exhaust collector ring very likely released exhaust gas into the engine/accessory bay; gas very likely entered the cabin through holes in the main firewall where three bolts were missing from the magneto access panels. The aircraft was fitted with a disposable CO detector, but CO detectors of its kind have been widely deemed unreliable.

The operators of the aircraft have implemented changes to the aircraft's system of maintenance, which include:

- The aircraft has been fitted with active electronic CO detectors.
- The check for the serviceability of the CO detectors has been incorporated into the monthly emergency equipment checklist.
- The new maintenance provider has been directed to classify the removal and installation of the main firewall access panels as a critical maintenance operation task, requiring certification by a licensed aircraft maintenance engineer and a conformity inspection.
- The new maintenance provider has been directed to conduct a mandatory test for the presence of CO following maintenance activities on the engine exhaust system or use of the main firewall access panels.
- An inspection of the magneto access panels and CO testing has been incorporated into the 100-hourly 'B' check inspection.

== In popular culture ==
The crash of the Sydney Seaplanes DHC-2 was featured in the 2023 episode "Dream Flight Disaster", of the Canadian-made, internationally distributed documentary series Mayday.

== See also ==
- 1967 Air Ferry DC-4 accident - another plane crash due to carbon monoxide poisoning
- 2019 English Channel Piper PA-46 crash - another plane crash due to carbon monoxide poisoning
- 2000 Queensland Beechcraft King Air crash - another Australian plane crash due to pilot incapacitation
