= Compass Airlines =

Compass Airlines may refer to:

- Compass Airlines (Australia)
- Compass Airlines (North America)
