= Aus-Air =

Australian airline

IATA	ICAO	Call sign
NO	AUS	AUS-AIR
- Founded: 1956
- Commenced operations: November 1986
- Ceased operations: 4 July 1999
- Operating bases: Moorabbin Airport
- Fleet size: 8
- Destinations: 6
- Headquarters: Melbourne, Australia

Aus-Air (Australian Air Charterers Pty Ltd) was an airline based in Melbourne, Australia. It operated a regional airline network, linking rural communities and provincial centres in Tasmania, Victoria and southern New South Wales with Melbourne. Its main base was Moorabbin Airport, Melbourne.

== History ==
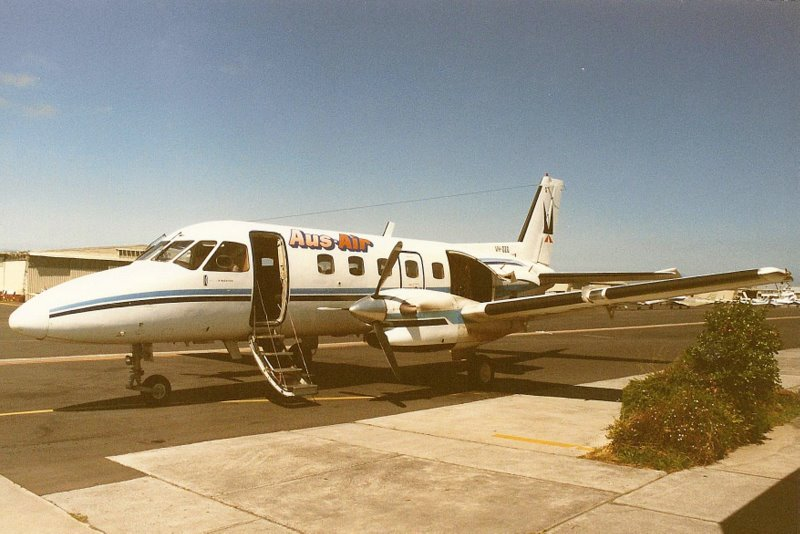
An Aus-Air Embraer EMB 110 Bandeirante at Moorabbin Airport in 1998

The privately owned Australian Air Charterers was established in 1956 and commenced scheduled services in November 1986 between Essendon Airport, Melbourne and Smithton Airport, Tasmania. The company moved its scheduled operations to its home base at Moorabbin Airport in July 1987. The Aus-Air website (in December 2008 still accessible) stated that in the latter-1990s it had 50 employees. The company encountered financial difficulties and in 1999 was placed in Administration - a legal term in Australian Law not unlike Chapter 11 Bankruptcy in the USA. The company and its assets were offered for sale however no buyer was found and Aus-Air ceased scheduled operations on 4 July 1999. The Aus-Air fleet of aircraft was subsequently purchased by Bankstown-based Airtex Aviation. As of December 2008 Aus-Air still operated three single-engined aircraft on a charter Air Operator Certificate.

As of April 2011, Aus-Air operates from Echuca in Victoria, north of Melbourne and offers charter flights.

== Destinations ==
At the time of its closure in 1999 Aus-Air operated services to the following domestic destinations:

- Melbourne (Moorabbin Airport)
- King Island
- Flinders Island
- Devonport
- Launceston
- Burnie

== Fleet ==
The Aus-Air fleet at the time it ceased operations consisted of the following aircraft:

- 2 Embraer EMB 110 Bandeirante
- 4 Piper PA31-350 Chieftain
- 2 Piper PA-31 Navajo

== See also ==
- List of defunct airlines of Australia
- Aviation in Australia
