= BNY (disambiguation) =

BNY is an American bank and finance company.

BNY, .BNY, Bny, or bny can also refer to:

== Transportation ==
- Anua Airport, an airport in Anua, Solomon Islands in Oceania, by IATA code
- Barhni railway station, a train station in Barhni, Uttar Pradesh, India
- Barnsley Interchange, a train station in Barnsley, South Yorkshire, England, U.K.
- Niesky station, a train station in Niesky, Germany
- Norfolk Island Airlines, an Australian airline that existed from 2017 to 2018

== Other ==
- Bandylite, a mineral; see List of mineral symbols
- Bintulu language, a language spoken in Borneo, by ISO 639 code
- BNY Music, a music publishing company founded by American businessman Jay Faires
- .BNY, a file format extended by the ShrinkIt lossless compression software
