= COJ =

COJ may mean:

- Call of Juarez, a Western-themed video game
- City of Jacksonville, specifically referring to the city government's offices
- Coonabarabran Airport, a small airport in Australia
- Cup of Joe, a Filipino pop/rock band
- European Court of Justice, the supreme court of the European Union in matters of European Union law
