= Transwest Airlines =

Airline of Australia

IATA	ICAO	Call sign
WW	—	-
- Founded: 1979
- Ceased operations: 1982
- Headquarters: Carnarvon Airport, Western Australia

Transwest Airlines was a commuter airline operating from its base in Jandakot Airport, Western Australia since 1979 until 1982 when it was amalgamated into Skywest Airlines (Australia).

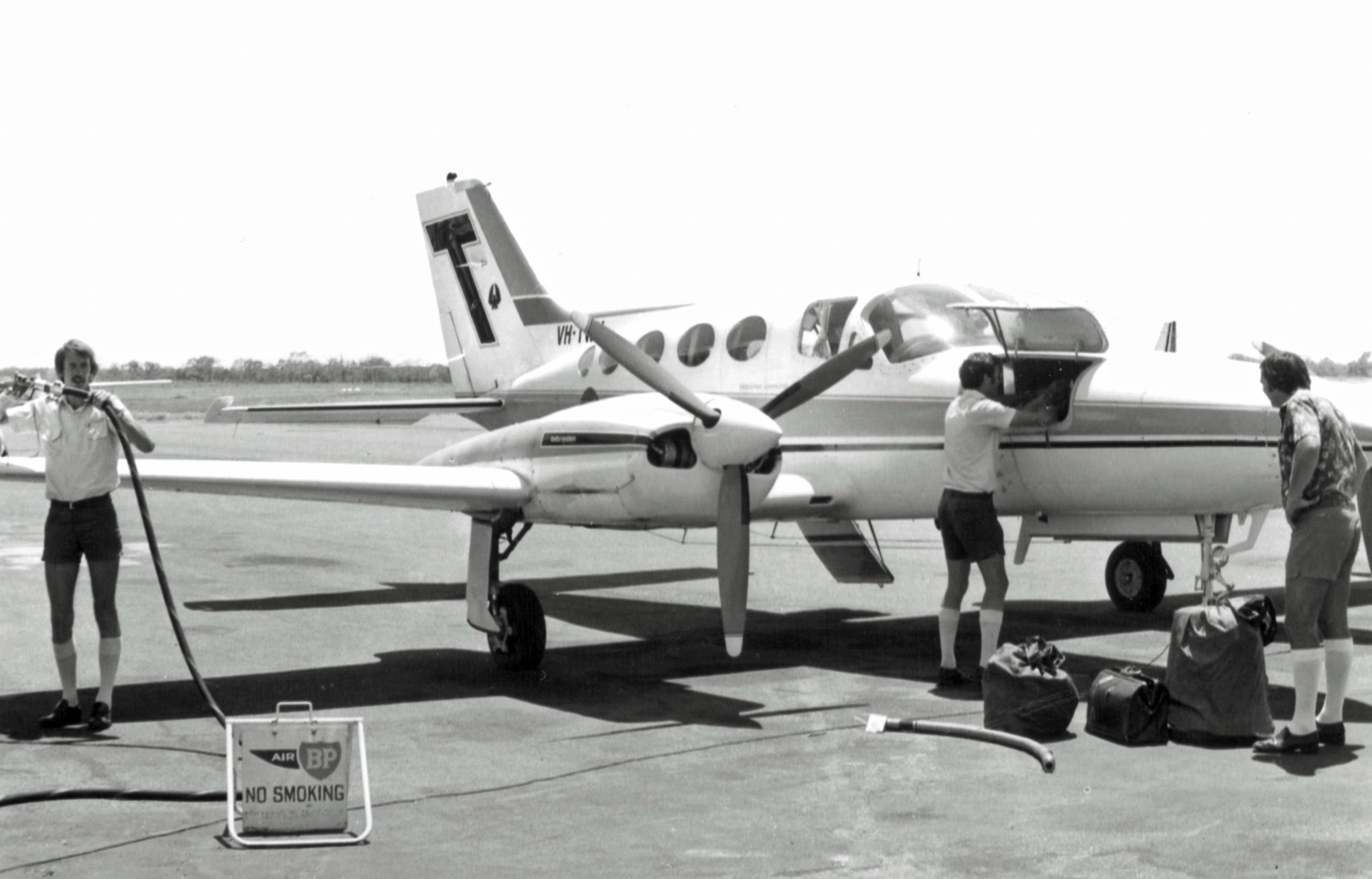
A Transwest aircraft refuelling at Derby in 1979

== History ==
After leaving QANTAS; before leaving Australia with English wife Jacqueline and later retiring as a Trans-Atlantic Airline Captain, TWA was initially founded by Captain Robert Cowley. His aviation Alma Mater was Royal Victorian Aero Club and he contributed his own capital, along with other prime backers at the start-up, who were all Melbourne based. These consisted of James Ryan [Barrister] - Ray Lanham [Caterer] - Neil Smith [Doctor]. Captain Cowley in fact wrote the original operations manual, which was submitted in 1966, to the then; Department of Civil Aviation, for the initial AOC. Many people in Perth helped in giving support; including but not limited to; Jack Antonovich, who introduced Robert to Lang Hancock, the Wright family and later Charles Court; The Hon Charles Court was then Minister for Local Government; first knighted in 1972 - ‘Sir Charles Court’ and in 1974 Premier of Western Australia. From 7 May 2013, the use of the Skywest brand was discontinued and the airline became part of the Virgin Australia brand, however it continues to operate under its current Air Operator's Certificate and its own management team.

The airline had its beginning in Carnarvon, Western Australia, where it operated as Trans-West Air Charter since 1967 employing Beech Baron and Cessna 206, focusing the activity on air charter services from Jandakot Airport, Geraldton, Port Hedland and Kalgoorlie.

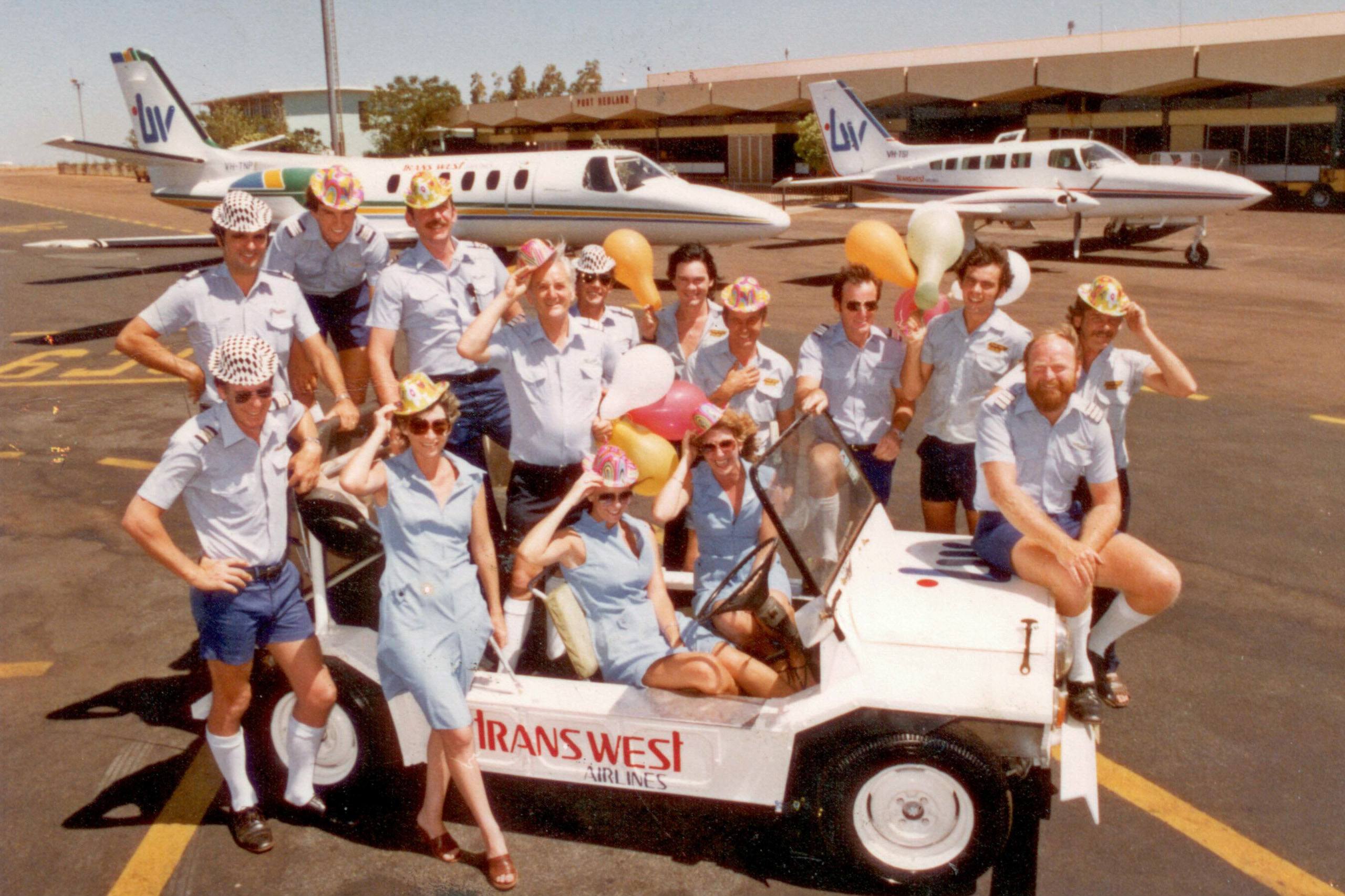
Promotion picture of Transwest airlines pilots and engineering staff at Port Hedland Airport - 1980

When it amalgamated into Skywest Airlines in 1982 it was the largest commuter airline in Western Australia operating a range of aircraft as Beech Baron, Beech King Air, BN-2 Islander, Cessna 206, Cessna 210, Cessna 310, Cessna 404, DHC-6 Twin Otter and employing 28 pilots operating out of 6 regional bases in Western Australia.

== Destinations ==
- Goldsworthy
- Kalgoorlie
- Leonora
- Marble Bar
- Nullagine
- Perth
- Port Hedland
- Tiaverton
- Windarra

== See also ==
- List of defunct airlines of Australia
- Aviation in Australia
