= Ad Astral Aviation =

Australian charter airline

IATA	ICAO	Call sign
AT	-	-
- Founded: 1986
- Ceased operations: 2016
- Hubs: Perth Airport
- Fleet size: 5
- Headquarters: Perth Airport, Australia
- Key people: Ron Magrath, OAM (Chief Pilot)
- Website: Official website

Ad Astral Aviation was a charter airline and former advanced flight school based at Perth Airport, Western Australia from 1986 to 2016. The company's name originated from the Latin phrase and common Air Force term 'ad astra' which means "to the stars".

== Operations ==
Ad Astral operated from the Perth Flight Centre in the general aviation precinct at Perth Airport. The charter airline branch of the company operated across Western Australia on mining contract flights as well as some occasional interstate ad hoc charters.

In late 2016, Ad Astral was acquired by Adelaide based charter airline Rossair in a deal to help both companies capture more of the growing tourism market in both South Australia and Western Australia.

== Fleet ==
Current fleet:

- Beechcraft 1900C – 2
- Beechcraft 1900D – 2
- Beechcraft 76 Duchess – 1

== See also ==
- List of defunct airlines of Australia
- Aviation in Australia
