= Aboriginal Air Services =

Airline of Australia

IATA	ICAO	Call sign
I8	-	-
- Founded: 2000
- Ceased operations: 2006
- Headquarters: Alice Springs Airport, Australia

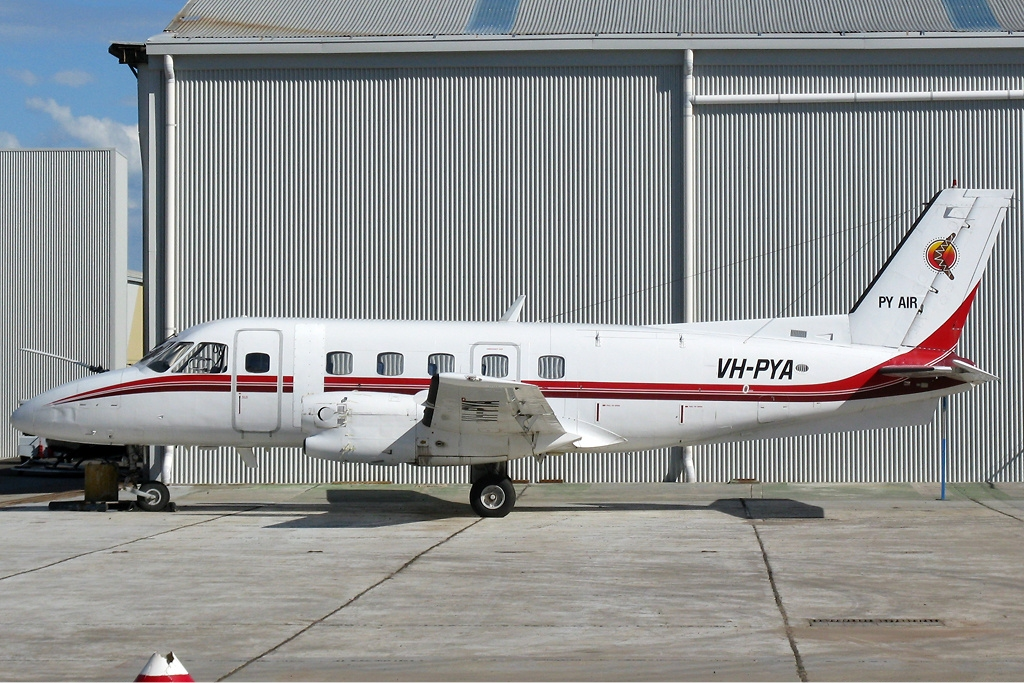
Engineless EMB-110 of PY Air at Essendon Airport

Aboriginal Air Services was an umbrella company of 4 distinct airlines owned by the Aboriginal people of central Australia. Four companies (see list below) gradually came together as a consortium over nearly twenty years. The consortium, known as Aboriginal Air Services was fully owned by Aboriginal people.

In the late 1990s, Aboriginal Air Services offered tourist flights on the mail plane.

The consortium ceased operating on 17 September 2006.

== History ==
The airlines which comprised Aboriginal Air Services were responsible for regular charter flights into the Northern Territory, Western Australia and South Australia. Before the company shut down, it was responsible for offering 29 regular flights each week. The company was offered patient retrieval flights into areas such as remote Anangu Pitjantjatjara land, and was based in Darwin, the capital city of the Northern Territory.

In early September 2006, the company's board decided to go into voluntary administration. Following this, the staff was reduced by 30 people and started to scale back the amount of flights per week. Some of the major contributing factors to these decisions was the withdrawal of one participant airline, NG Air, and the amount of flights per week not being economically viable during the wet season, when the volume of tourism lulls. Although the Transport Minister of the Northern Territory at the time, Delia Lawrie, expressed that there was a possibility that the Aboriginal Air Services would not have to shut down, the company was ultimately liquidated later that same month.

The closure of the company was expected to have a negative impact on people living in remote areas of Australia and Aboriginal health services. A spokesman for Nganampa Health Council, an Aboriginal health service, expressed concerns that the closure would cause delays in blood tests and doctors appointments, and that several communities were seeking alternative methods of transport.

== Airlines ==
- Ngaanyatjarra Air (Western Australia)
- Ngurratjuta Air (Northern Territory, operated by the Ngurajuta Association of Hermannsburg)
- Janami Air (Northern Territory, from the Warlpiri tribe)
- PY Air (South Australia)

== Fleet ==
- Cessna 208 Caravan
- Cessna 210
- Cessna Grand Caravan
- Embraer EMB 110 Bandeirante

== See also ==
- List of defunct airlines of Australia
- Aviation in Australia
