= Queensland Pacific Airlines =

Australian airline

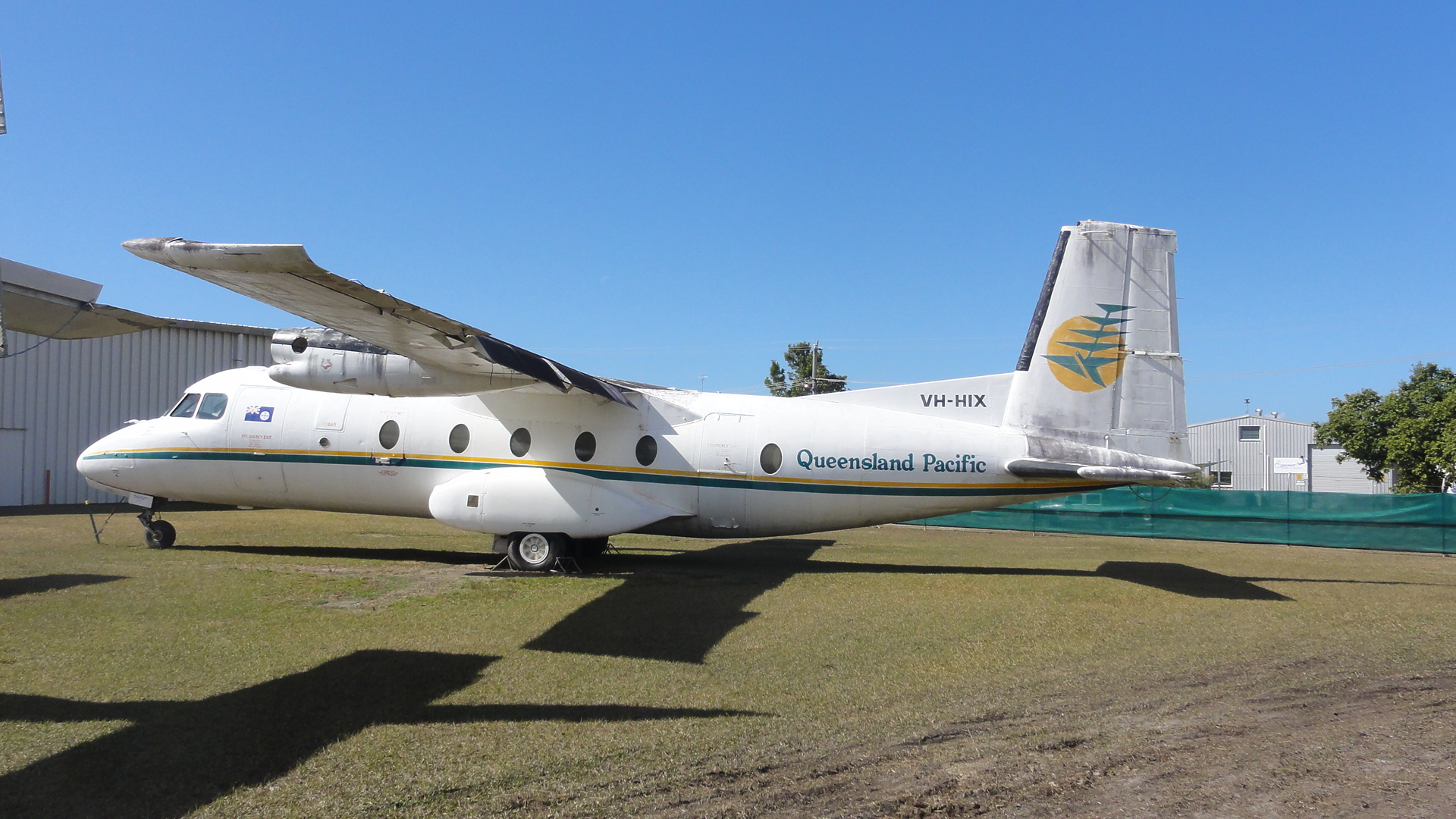
- Queensland Pacific Mohawk at the Queensland Air Museum
IATA	ICAO	Call sign
-	-	-
- Commenced operations: 1988
- Ceased operations: 1991
- Fleet size: Nord Mohawk; Embraer EMB 110 Bandeirante
- Destinations: See Destinations below
- Headquarters: Australia

Queensland Pacific Airlines was an Australian airline which commenced operations on 4 December 1988; the following year purchased Sungold Airlines and on 1 March 1991 ceased operations while the assets were acquired by Southern Pacific Regional Airlines.

== Destinations ==
It conducted services between the following centres: Brisbane, Bundaberg, Gladstone, Rockhampton, Mackay, Townsville, Blackwater, Thangool, Coolangatta and Newcastle.

== Fleet ==
It operated Nord Mohawk aircraft and Embraer EMB 110 Bandeirantes.

== See also ==
- List of defunct airlines of Australia
- Aviation in Australia
