= Golden Eagle Airlines =

Airline of Australia

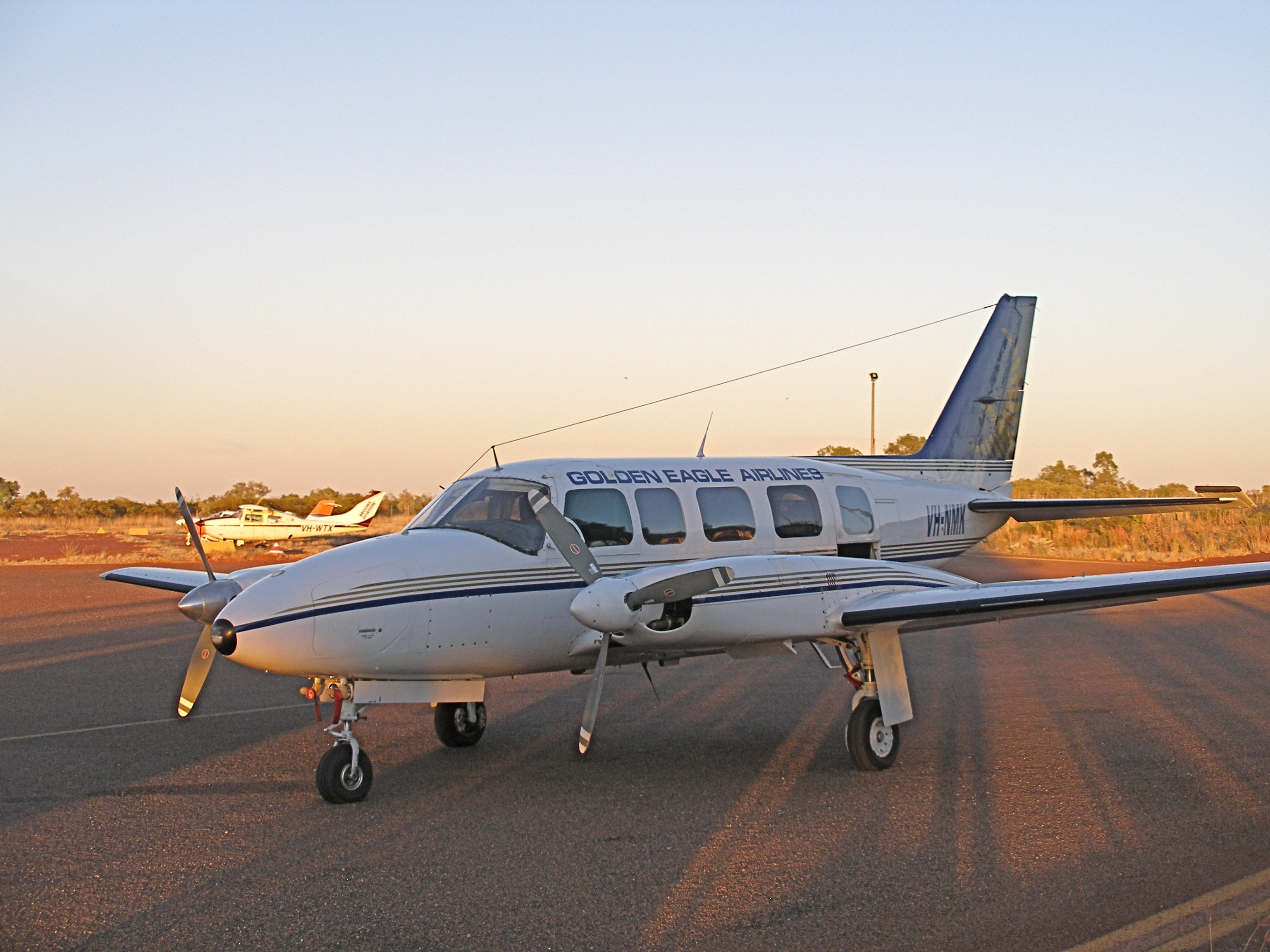
Golden Eagle Airlines Piper Chieftain

Golden Eagle Airlines was a regional airline of north Western Australia with bases at Port Hedland, Derby and Broome. It flew charter flights to regional destinations.

== Accidents ==
- On 11 July 2012, a Golden Eagle Airlines Piper Seneca crashed shortly after takeoff from Broome Airport on its way to Port Hedland. The aircraft was located two kilometers south of Cable Beach. The pilot, who was the only person on board the aircraft, was killed.

== See also ==
- List of defunct airlines of Australia
- Aviation in Australia
