= Regional Pacific Airlines =

Airline based in Queensland, Australia (2001–2010)

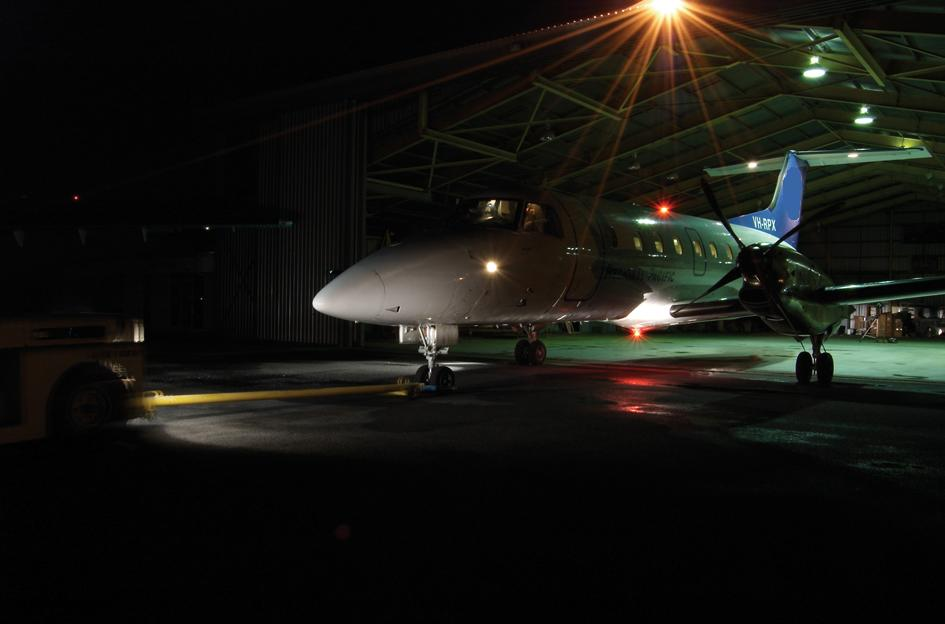
IATA	ICAO	Call sign
QT	—	—
- Founded: May 2001
- Ceased operations: 2010
- Operating bases: Cairns Airport
- Parent company: Aviation Management Consultants Pty Ltd
- Headquarters: Cairns, Queensland, Australia
- Website: www.RegionalPacific.com.au

Regional Pacific Airlines was an airline based in Cairns, Queensland, Australia.

== History ==
It was established and started operations in May 2001 and operated scheduled services from Horn Island in Queensland. On 29 June 2010, it was announced that Regional Pacific Airlines had gone into administration and all business and flight operations were stopped.

== Fleet ==
As of May 2009, the Regional Pacific Airlines fleet includes two (2) Embraer EMB 120ER Brasilia aircraft.

== Destinations ==
As of November 2009, Regional Pacific Airlines operated scheduled service to the following domestic destinations:

- Alice Springs (ASP) – Alice Springs Airport (1 flight daily to Mount Isa)
- Bamaga (BAM) – Northern Peninsula Airport (2 flights daily to Cairns)
- Cairns (CNS) – Cairns Airport (2 flights daily to Bamaga, 3 flights daily to Mount Isa)
- Mount Isa (ISA) – Mount Isa Airport (2 flights daily to Alice Springs, 3 flights daily to Cairns)

== See also ==
- List of defunct airlines of Australia
- Aviation in Australia
