= Tamair =

Australian airline

Tamair Pty. Ltd.
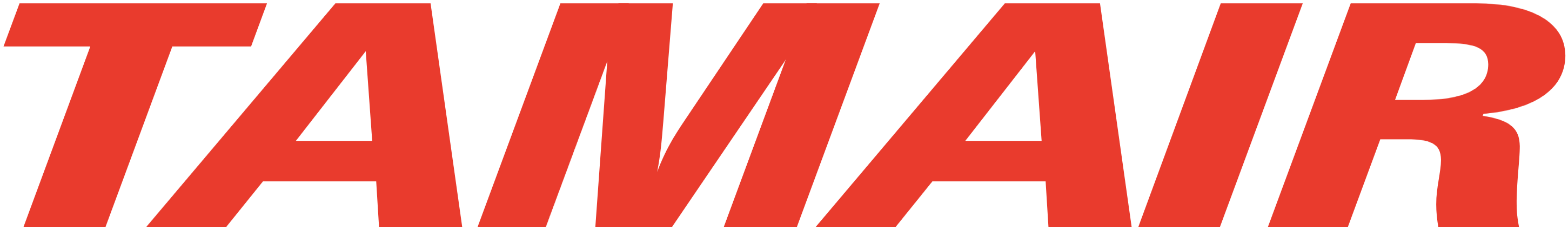

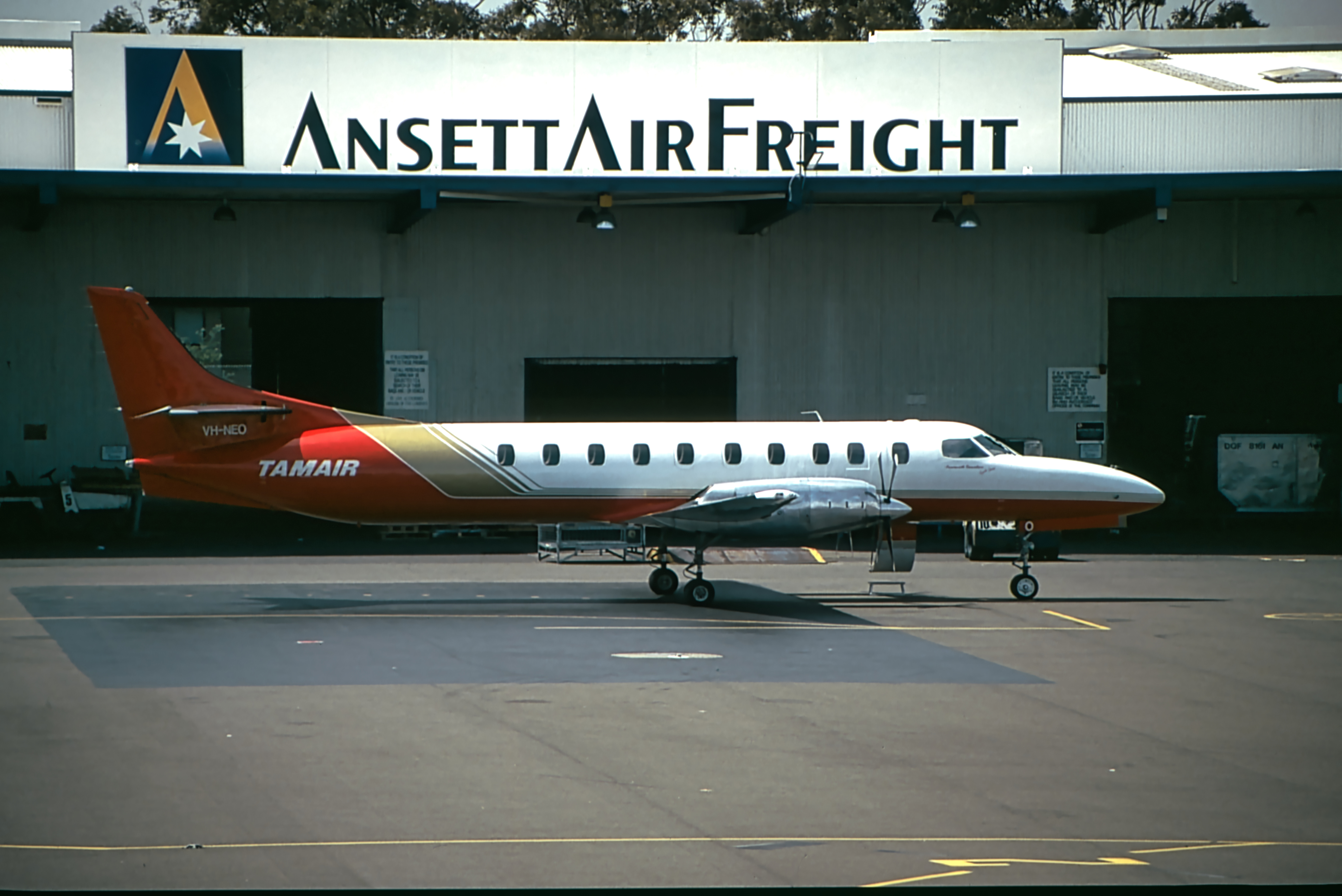
- Tamair Metro 23 parked at Sydney Airport
IATA	ICAO	Call sign
GG	TMR	—
- Founded: 1985
- Commenced operations: August 1992
- Ceased operations: August 1998
- Operating bases: Tamworth Airport
- Headquarters: Tamworth, New South Wales, Australia
- Website: tamair.com.au

Tamair was an Australian airline based in Tamworth, New South Wales.

== History ==
Tamair commenced in August 1992 operating between Tamworth and Sydney. In May 1996 it took took over the Sydney to Glen Innes and Inverell from Impulse Airlines.

In June 1998 it was placed in voluntary administration as a result of financial problems from an association with Airlines of Tasmania. A scheme of arrangement was agreed with its creditors to restructure the business, however in August 1998 operations ceased after the Civil Aviation Safety Authority suspended Tamair's air operator's certificate.

== Fleet ==
As of April 1995, Tamair fleet consisted of the following aircraft:

- 6 Cessna 310
- 2 Turbo Commander
- 3 Metro III
