= Tasair =

Australian regional airline

| IATA | ICAO | Call sign |
|---|---|---|
| TA | N/A | N/A |
- Founded: 1965
- Ceased operations: 2012
- Hubs: Hobart; Devonport
- Fleet size: 12
- Destinations: 4
- Headquarters: Hobart, Australia
- Key people: George Ashwood (Managing Director)
- Website: www.tasair.com.au

Tasair was an airline based in Hobart and Devonport, Australia. It operated a regional network across Tasmania until it was placed in voluntary liquidation on 3 February 2012.

== History ==
Tasair was established in 1965. It began as an air charter, maintenance, and flying school operation. Scheduled operations commenced on 27 March 1998 on a triangular service from Hobart to Devonport and Burnie, using a Piper PA-31-350 Chieftain and two Aero Commander 500S Shrike Commanders. Four months later operations from Devonport to King Island via Burnie commenced. In May 2010 Burnie was dropped from the structure of regular flights. Tasair's busiest sector was between Devonport and King Island. The company was placed in voluntary liquidation on 3 February 2012.

== Legal Issues ==
In December 2009, Tasair was speculated to be involved in charter flights hired by a PR firm for Japan's 'Institute of Cetacean Research' whaling company to spy on anti-whaling vessels, an action later condemned by the Australian Government and deemed illegal under a 2008 Australian Court order preventing any assistance to whaling operations. Tasair has declined to comment on whether its planes or staff were involved in the flights. Managing director George Ashwood says that kind of information is commercial in confidence. The incident caused the Civil Aviation Safety Authority (CASA) to start a national investigation into companies conducting flights over water. Tasair incurred hefty legal bills dealing with the CASA probe and another by the Environmental Defender's Office that included demands that documents be surrendered. CASA boss John McCormick told the Senate committee Tasair's air operator's certificate covered domestic operations in Australia and it was technically in breach of regulations if it travelled beyond 12 nautical miles but admitted there was confusion within the industry and resulted in no action taken against the air charter operator.

== Services ==
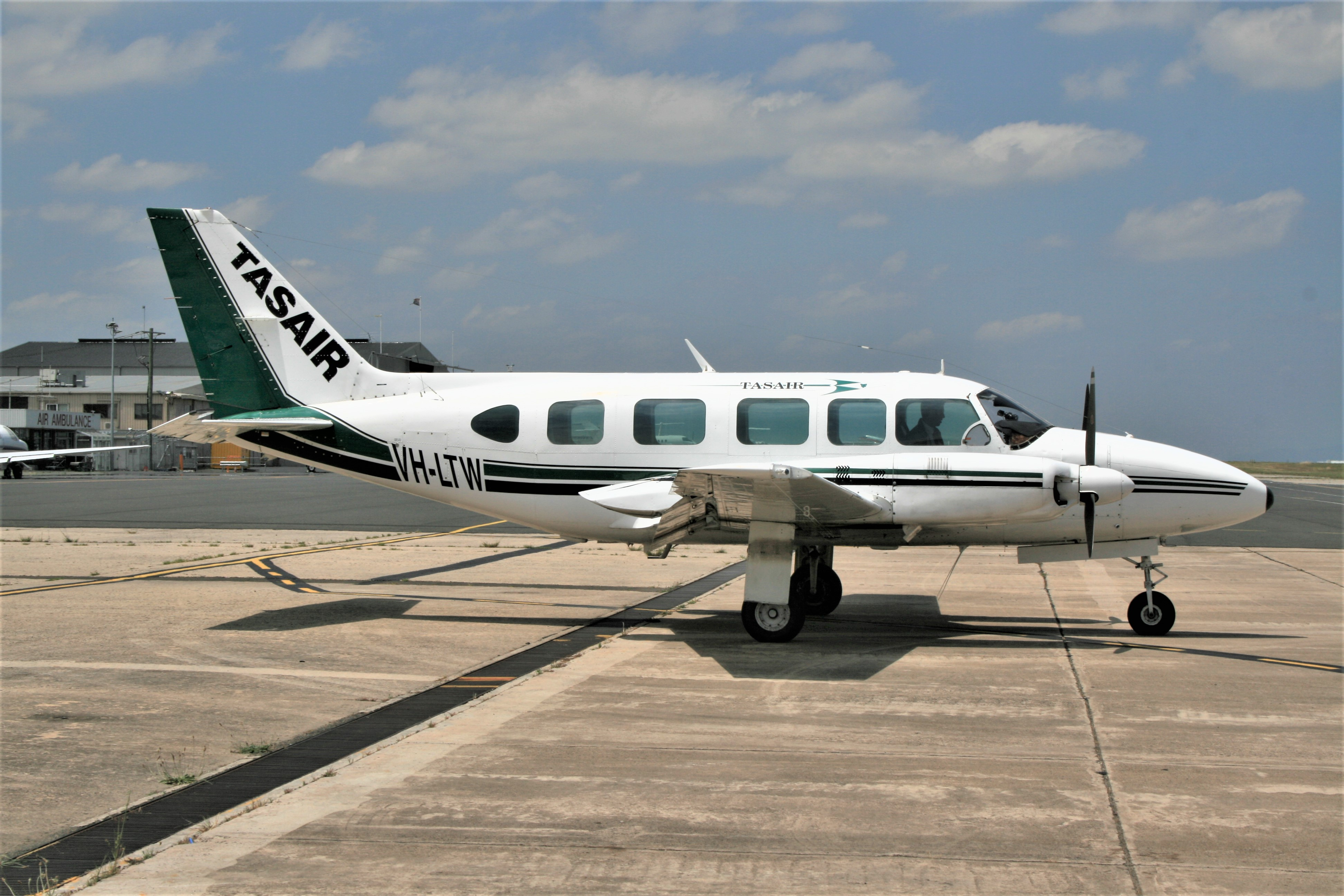
Tasair Piper PA-31-350 Chieftain

As of September 2011, Tasair operated scheduled passenger flights to the following destinations:

- Hobart
- Devonport
- King Island
- Burnie

It also offered bushwalking flights to Melaleuca in the Southwest National Park.

Regular freight services were conducted between Hobart, Devonport, King Island and Burnie. Night freight operations were also conducted from Hobart to Essendon via Devonport, returning to Hobart via Launceston.

Charter flights were also operated to many destinations throughout Tasmania and mainland Australia.

Tasair also operated scenic flights across Tasmania including Maria Island, the Tasman Peninsula, South West Wilderness, Bruny Island and Hobart.

== Fleet ==
As of September 2011 the Tasair fleet consisted of the following:

- 1 British Aerospace 3107 Jetstream 31
- 4 Piper PA31-350 Chieftain
- 1 Aero Commander 500S Shrike Commander
- 2 Cessna U206 Stationair
- 4 Cessna 172 Skyhawk

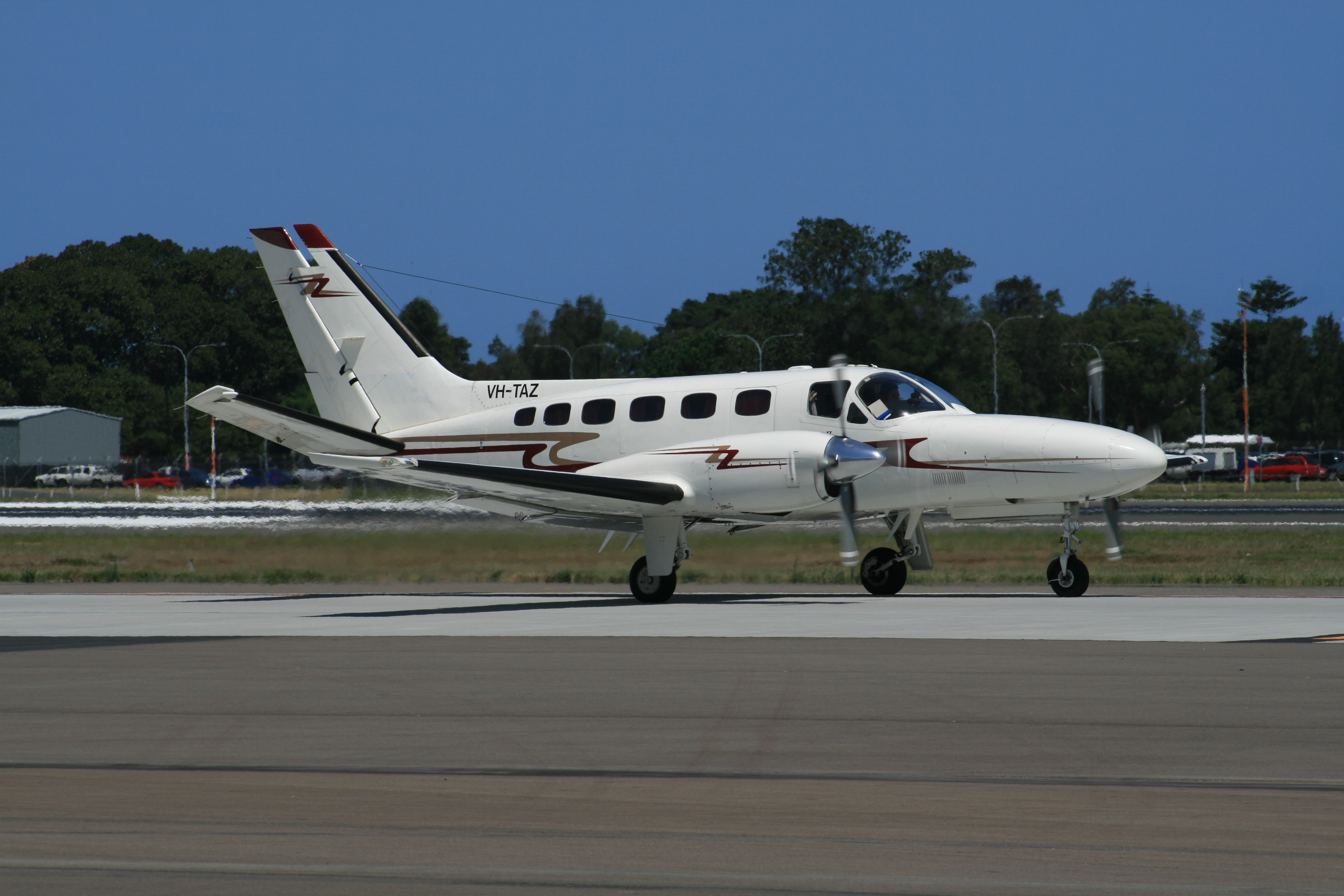
Tasair disposed of this Cessna Conquest II in 2008

The Chieftains were used on Tasair's scheduled services and for charters. The Cessnas were used to carry bushwalkers to remote locations; for sightseeing; and for flight training.

=== Previously operated ===
- Cessna 441 Conquest II

== See also ==
- List of defunct airlines of Australia
