= BackpackersXpress =

Failed proposal for an Australian airline

Backpackers Express
- Founded: 2003; 23 years ago
- Ceased operations: April 2005; 21 years ago
- Headquarters: Brisbane, Queensland, Australia

BackpackersXpress was a proposed airline to have been based in Melbourne, Australia. It was established in 2003 and sought to start a long-haul, low-fares operation using two dry-leased Boeing 747 aircraft. Proposed destinations included Delhi, Bangkok, Munich and Manchester. The company failed to gain regulatory approval for its proposed routes and did not take delivery of any aircraft. It shut down in 2005 before conducting any flights.

== History ==
=== Proposal ===
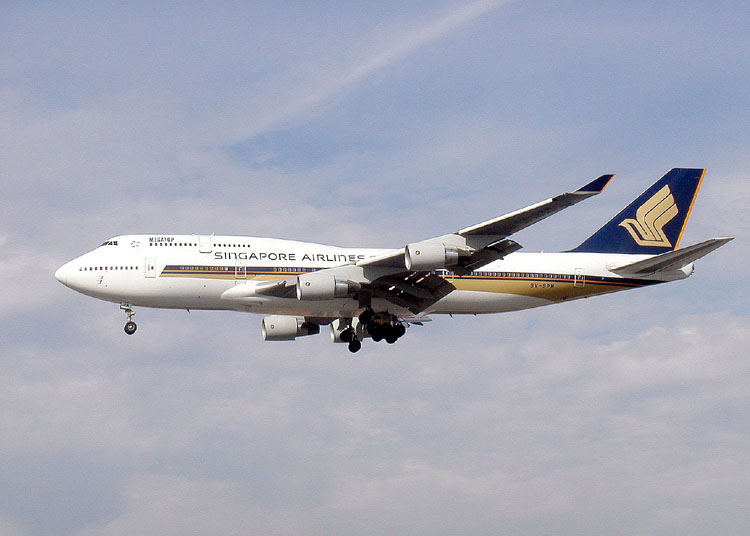
A Singapore Airlines Boeing 747-400 in 2003. BackpackersXpress sought to lease two Boeing 747s from the airline.

In June 2003, BackpackersXpress sought A $80 million with the goal to begin operations in November 2003. However, investors were reluctant to provide funding due to concerns over the impact on the aviation industry of the Iraq War and Severe acute respiratory syndrome epidemic. The project proponents told the Australian Financial Review in December that year that they had been able to demonstrate that the market for backpacker tourism was less affected by these events, and that they intended to apply for an air operator's certificate in January 2004.

BackpackersXpress hoped to attract backpackers by offering relatively low fares, fitting the Boeing 747s with a pub, and providing live entertainment to passengers. The aircrew would encourage passengers to socialise, and Indigenous Australians would provide information on their culture. It was also planned to conduct karaoke and dance competitions during the flights. The Boeing 747s were to be fitted with 473 seats, which was 100 more than typical. The aircraft would also carry up to 20 tonnes of freight per flight.

In December 2003 it was reported that there was an in-principle agreement for Carlton & United Breweries to be the airline's "official brewer", and Neighbours actor Ryan Moloney would appear in its advertising. At this time the company claimed it would attract 139,000 passengers during its initial year of operations.

BackpackersXpress had 14 staff members in May 2004, and was holding talks with Singapore Airlines about leasing aircraft and an unnamed British airline concerning funding for the venture. The company claimed that it would employ 400 people once flights commenced. At this time it was still not able to operate flights as it did not have an air operator's certificate. An industry expert interviewed by Bloomberg News was sceptical that the venture was viable given that the proponents did not have a track record in the aviation industry and the market for long-haul flights was highly competitive. In February 2004 a writer in The Times stated that "It seems doubtful to any sane observer ... whether the project will ever get off the ground", and that the plan to encourage a "party in the sky" was "a radical move" given the concerns over air rage and terrorism.

=== Failure ===
On 30 July 2004 the International Air Services Commission (IASC) rejected an application from BackpackersXpress for permission to fly up to three flights per week between Australia and the United Kingdom as the company had not demonstrated that it would be able to operate the services. The right to conduct these flights was awarded to Qantas. An earlier application by BackpackersXpress to operate between Australia and India had also been rejected on the same grounds. The IASC noted in its determination regarding flights between Australia and the UK that this judgement meant that there would not be any unallocated capacity for BackpackersXpress to operate on this route in the foreseeable future, even if it was able to further develop its business model and gain necessary regulatory approvals. At this time BackpackersXpress had not been able to reach an agreement to lease aircraft.

In August 2004 BackpackersXpress was planning to start an accommodation and touring company to generate cash flow and raise the firm's profile before commencing flights. By September it had dropped its plan to fly from Melbourne, and was considering using Darwin or Cairns as its base. In November that year the Australian Financial Review reported that BackpackersXpress was "redoing the numbers" that underpinned its business plan after its application for flights to the UK was rejected.

Seed funding for the BackpackersXpress was withdrawn on 20 January 2005, and the company closed in April that year. During its existence BackpackersXpress' total expenditure was $A1 million. Two of the company's creditors were conducting legal action to reclaim debts in April 2005.

A 2006 story in The Sydney Morning Herald stated that the failure of BackpackersXpress suggested that two other proposals to launch long-haul discount airlines at the time were unlikely to be successful.

== See also ==
- List of defunct airlines of Australia
