= Yanda Airlines =

Australian airline

IATA	ICAO	Call sign
YE	-	-
- Founded: 1988
- Ceased operations: 2001
- Fleet size: 4
- Destinations: Coonabarabran, Gunnedah, Maitland, Scone, Singleton, Sydney
- Headquarters: Singleton, New South Wales, Australia
- Key people: Paul Rees

Yanda Airlines was a small Australian regional airline that served the Hunter Valley and north west New South Wales from 1988 until 2001. Following the company's demise, most of the communities Yanda served have been left without scheduled air services.

== History ==
The family owned business was established by Paul Rees who purchased Singleton Air Services operating Cessna 402 and the small Singleton Airport in 1980, intending to franchise routes that would use Singleton as a regional hub and connect onward to Sydney. Services branded as Yanda Airlines commenced in 1988 as a milk run between Scone and Sydney with intermediate stops in Singleton and Maitland utilising a 9-seat Piper PA-31 Chieftain.

The airline added a second route Coonabarabran - Gunnedah - Sydney in 1991 following the withdrawal of Hazelton Airlines from these towns. By 1998, the Yanda's fleet comprised 3 Piper PA-31s and one EMB 820C (PA-31 Chieftain built under license by Embraer in Brazil), and the company employed 12 staff. Aircraft and pilots were based in Scone and Coonabarabran, with maintenance contracted to a Scone-based company.

Yanda operated services as commuter flights in response to demand, often combining scheduled flights to increase passenger load factors. This operational flexibility allowed the company to remain profitable while operating very marginal routes.

== Controversies ==
The company's Air operator's certificate was controversially suspended by the Civil Aviation Safety Authority on 5 January 2001, following an incident after takeoff at Gunnedah. The pilot requested the assistance of passengers to assist in controlling the aircraft while an incorrect trim setting was rectified. CASA cited a 'history of operational problems' since 1997 and this incident as reasons for the grounding, despite acknowledging satisfactory compliance by the company regarding the previous safety issues. Yanda's management and local councils who relied on the airline for commuter service accused the regulator of inconsistency in the application of standards, as systematic problems had recently been identified in the maintenance practices of Ansett Australia, a major national carrier, and that airline had been permitted to continue operating by the regulator. CASA maintains their action in grounding the airline was justified in the interest of public safety, and that the nature of the incident if mis-handled could have caused the aircraft to crash. The airline did not apply to have the AOC renewed, with Mr Rees claiming his company had been made into a scapegoat and its reputation destroyed.

=== Final report ===
The subsequent report by the Australian Transport Safety Bureau released in November 2001 attributed the incident to pilot error and uncovered no systematic problems with the airlines' training or maintenance routines.
