= Norfolk Island Airlines =

Australian regional airline

Norfolk Island Airlines (1973-1991)
IATA	ICAO	Call sign
UG	NIA	–
- Commenced operations: 1973
- Ceased operations: 1991
- Operating bases: Norfolk Island Airport
- Destinations: Brisbane; Lord Howe Island Airport
- Headquarters: Norfolk Island, Australia

Norfolk Island Airlines Limited was a regional airline based on Norfolk Island which operated services to the Australian mainland from Norfolk and Lord Howe Islands.

The airline commenced operations in 1973 with a Beech Baron on services from Norfolk Island Airport to Brisbane. A Beech King Air 200 was acquired by the airline in 1975 and services began from Lord Howe Island Airport in 1976.

In 1988 it was renamed to Norfolk Airlines and operated Beech Queen Air and BN Islander and ceased the operations in 1991.

The route between Norfolk Island and Brisbane is some 800 nautical miles (1,500 km), making it one of the longest commuter airline routes in the world.

== See also ==
- List of defunct airlines of Australia
- Aviation in Australia
