= Airtex Aviation =

Australian air charter company

- Founded: 1982
- Commenced operations: 1982
- Ceased operations: 2010
- Hubs: Bankstown Airport, Sydney, NSW
- Headquarters: Bankstown Airport; Bankstown, Sydney, NSW, Australia

Avtex Air Services Pty Ltd, trading as Airtex Aviation, was an Australian air charter company with its head office at Bankstown Airport, Sydney. Formed in 1982, the company operated passenger and freight air charter services, as well as air search and rescue services.

On 20 July 2010 the Civil Aviation Safety Authority suspended the operator certificates of Avtex and its sister company Skymaster Air Services, which operated the organisation's piston engine aircraft, after a crash on an Airtex aircraft in Canley Vale in western Sydney which caused two deaths. A number of other serious incidents in the time prior to the accident had been taken in consideration for this decision. Further enquiries found that "pilot bullying, deliberate rule breaking and corner cutting were amongst the unsafe practices". After the matter ran its course by February 2011, Avtex and Skymaster were left without further recourse against the suspension of their air operator's certificates and had to cease operations.

== Fleet ==
As of December 2009, the Airtex fleet consisted of:

- 1 Cessna 340
- 2 Fairchild SA227-AC Metro III
- 10 Piper PA-31-350 Chieftain
- 3 Piper PA-31P-350 Mojave
- 1 Piper PA-31 Navajo
- 2 Ted Smith Aerostar 600
- 1 Ted Smith Aerostar 601P

== Incidents and accidents ==
- On 25 June 2001, an Airtex Aviation Embraer EMB-110P1 Bandeirante aircraft with nine people on board transmitted a mayday call on its approach to the airport in the town of Cootamundra, New South Wales. The pilot reported smoke in the cabin and an engine and gear failure, followed by instructing the passengers to adopt the "brace position". The aircraft touched down and skidded 400 metres (437 yards) with its right engine in flames. All passengers survived the crash.
- On 9 April 2008, at 23:30, an Airtex Aviation Fairchild Metro III aircraft took off from Sydney Airport in Sydney, bound for Brisbane with a consignment of air freight. Shortly after takeoff, ten nautical miles (18.5 km / 11.5 miles) southeast of the airport, the aircraft turned contrary to instructions from air traffic control, initially to the right when the controller had instructed a left turn. The pilot responded that he was experiencing "minor technical problems". The aircraft disappeared from radar at a height of 4,000 ft (1,219 metres). The wreckage was located on the seabed nine kilometres south-east of Bundeena.
- On 15 June 2010, an Airtex Aviation Piper PA-31 Mojave clipped power lines and crashed in Canley Vale in Sydney's south-west shortly after take-off from Bankstown Airport. The pilot and flight nurse were killed.

== See also ==
- List of defunct airlines of Australia
- Aviation in Australia
