= Coonabarabran Airport =

Airport in New South Wales, Australia

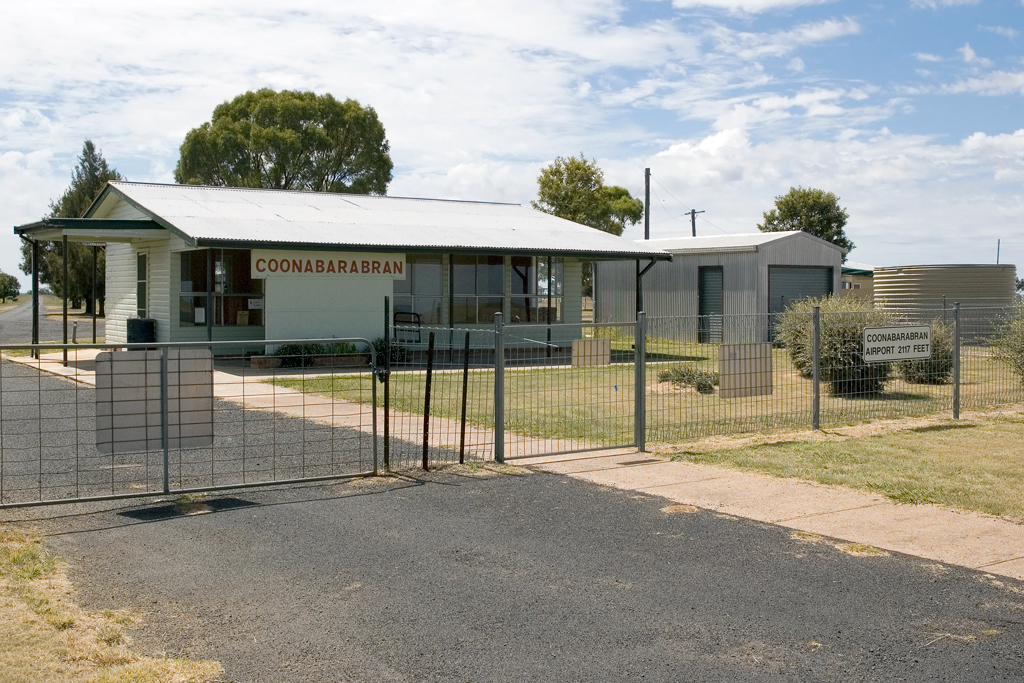
- IATA: COJ; ICAO: YCBB

Summary
- Airport type: Public
- Operator: Warrumbungle Shire Council
- Location: Coonabarabran, New South Wales
- Elevation AMSL: 2,117 ft / 645 m
- Coordinates: 31°20′S 149°16′E

Map
- Location in New South Wales

Runways
Direction	Length		Surface
Direction	m	ft	Surface
11/29	1,520	4,987	Asphalt
01/19	649	2,129	Grass
- Sources: AIP

Coonabarabran Airport (IATA: COJ, ICAO: YCBB) is a small airport located 4 nautical miles (7.4 km; 4.6 mi) south of Coonabarabran, New South Wales, Australia.

Coonabarabran Airport appeared on an episode of Royal Flying Doctor Service on Monday 1 October 2007.

Coonabarabran Airport has a grass runway, 01/19 and a sealed runway 11/29. From 1991 to 2001 Yanda Airlines based an aircraft and pilots at the airport to provide 12 weekly commuter flights to Sydney via Gunnedah. Although Coonabarabran no longer has a passenger service, the airport is used by the local aeroclub regularly.

== See also ==
- List of airports in New South Wales
