= Sydney Seaplanes =

Australian airline

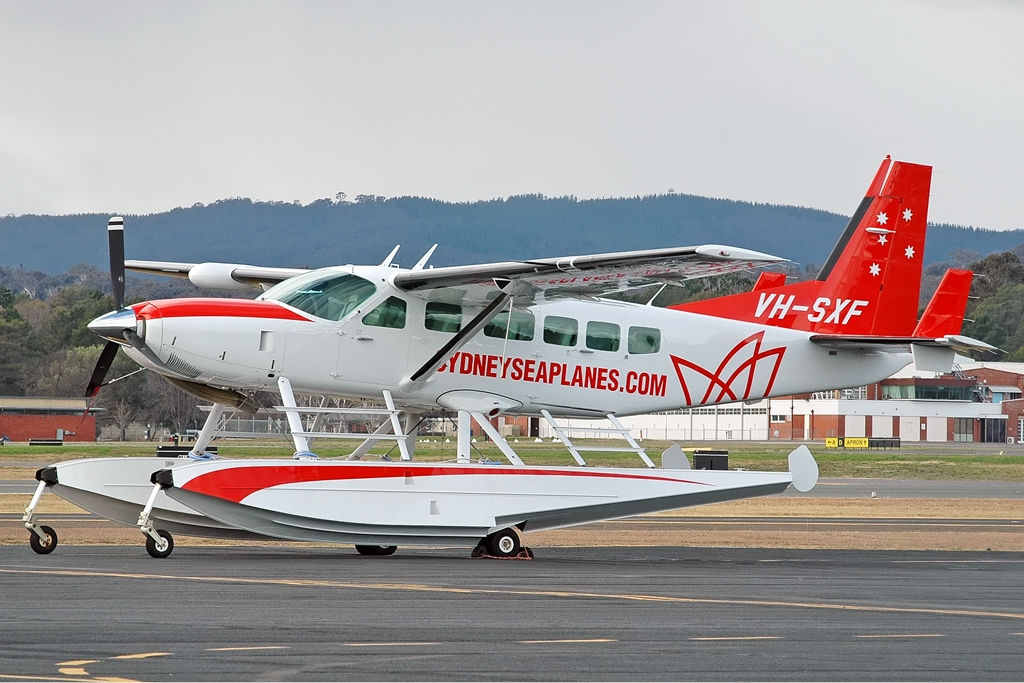
- Sydney Seaplanes Cessna 208 Caravan
- Founded: 2 August 2006
- Hubs: Rose Bay Water Airport
- Fleet size: 5
- Destinations: 6
- Headquarters: Rose Bay, New South Wales, Australia
- Key people: Aaron Shaw (Founder and Managing Director)
- Website: seaplanes.com.au

Sydney Seaplanes, a domestic and charter carrier in the Sydney area, is Australia's largest seaplane operator, conducting hundreds of weekly flights during peak tourist seasons. Established in August 2006 through the merger of Sydney Harbour Seaplanes, Seaplane Safaris, Southern Cross Seaplanes, and two other operators, the company was founded and is managed by Aaron Shaw. Initially operating with one aircraft, Sydney Seaplanes has expanded in response to the growing Asian tourist market and VIP leisure travel.

== History ==
The airline was formed in August 2006 through the merger of Sydney Harbour Seaplanes, Seaplane Safaris, Southern Cross Seaplanes and two other operators. The founder and managing director is Aaron Shaw. In late 2016, a new era of growth for the airline was ushered in with the new harbourside terminal being opened, with the 'Empire Lounge' restaurant/bar inside. In 2017, Sydney Seaplanes partnered with Dr Jerry Schwartz of Schwartz Family Co. to expand the airlines fleet, purchasing two additional amphibious Cessna Caravan aircraft.

In 2016, the new Rose Bay terminal was opened, with the 'Empire Lounge' located within the terminal. It is Australia's first purpose-built seaplane terminal and has an outdoor decking area with views over the water.

It has flown celebrities around when in Sydney, including Ed Sheeran, Top Gear and The Grand Tour presenters Jeremy Clarkson and James May, Cuba Gooding Jr, Sam Smith and Pippa Middleton

== Fleet ==
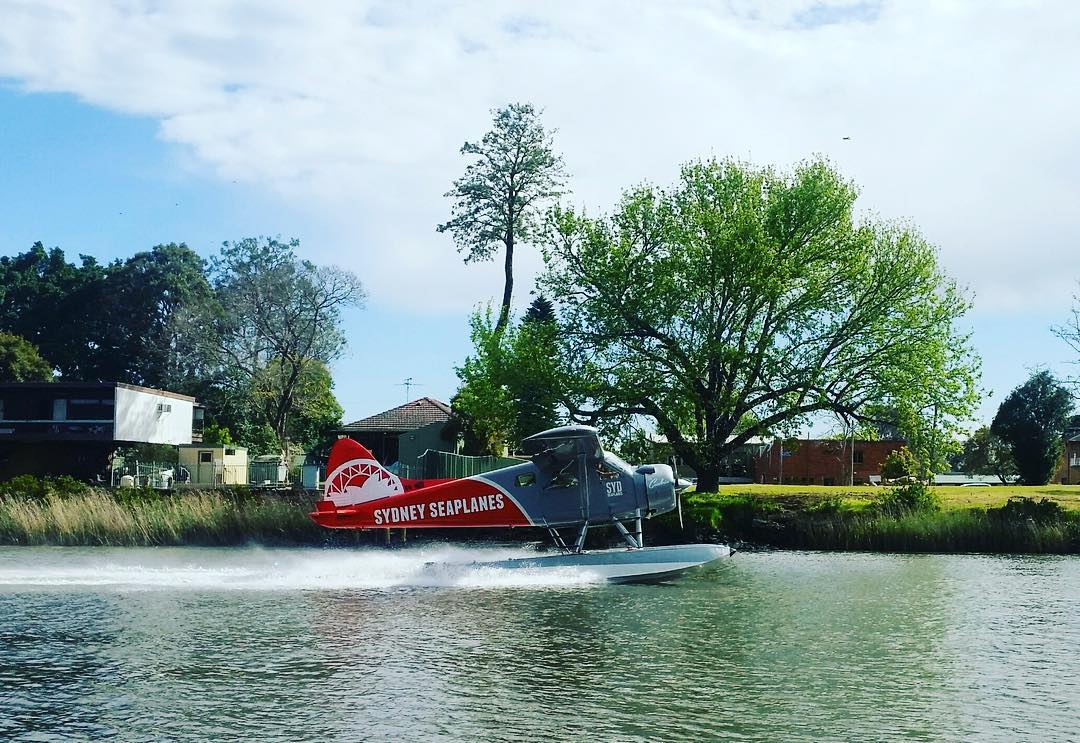
A Sydney Seaplanes DHC-2 Beaver taking off

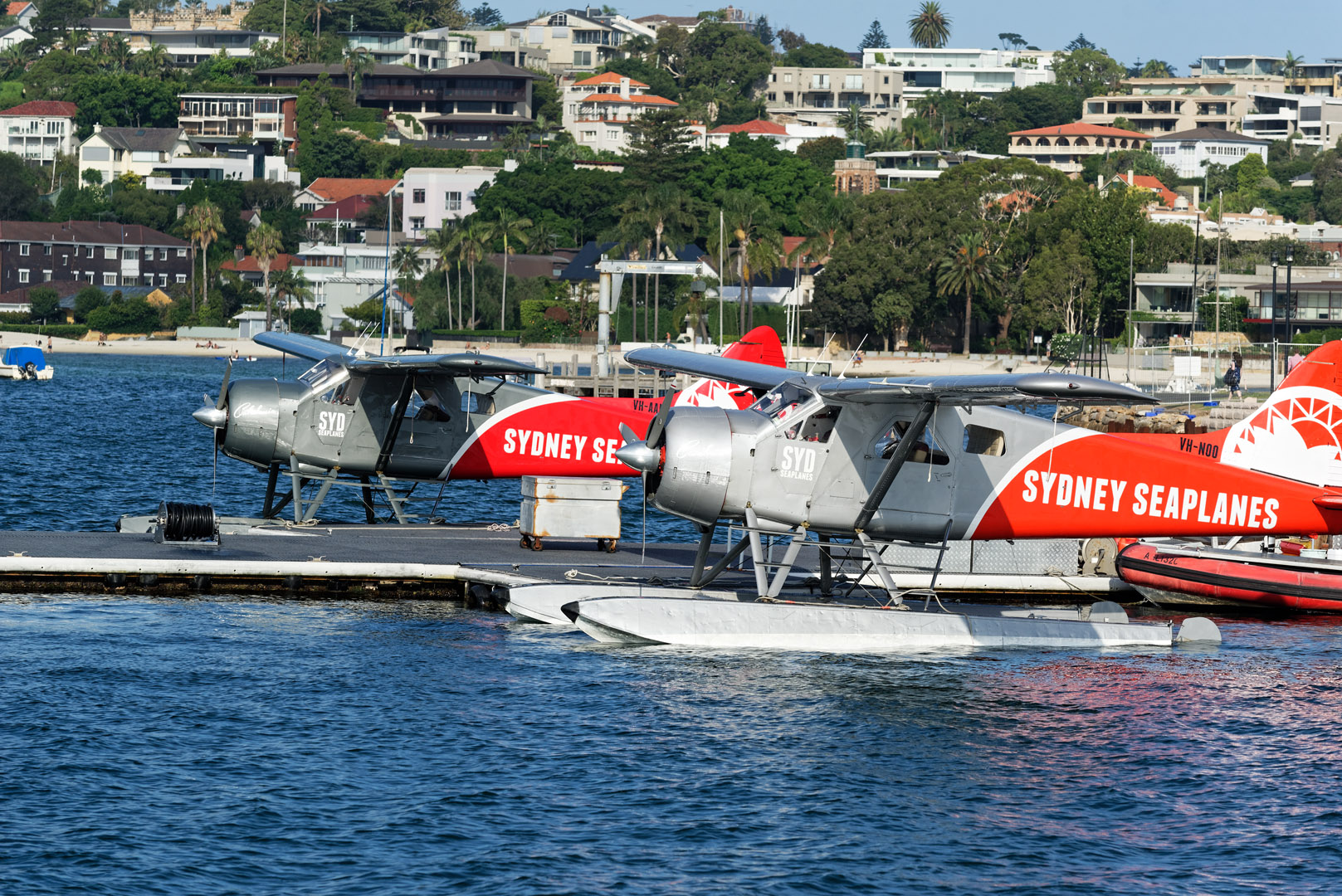
The fleet of DHC-2 Beavers operated Sydney Seaplanes at Rose Bay terminal

The five aircraft fleet of Sydney Seaplanes includes the following aircraft (at May 2025):

- 2 de Havilland Canada DHC-2 Beaver* - VH-NXF & VH-CXS
- 2 Cessna 208 Caravan - VH-IOV & VH-SXF

*Refer below to the incident regarding one of the Sydney Seaplanes owned DHC-2 Beaver.

Sydney Seaplanes also has previously indicated plans to grow the fleet with more Cessna 208 Caravan aircraft.

== Destinations ==
Sydney Seaplanes operates to a number of destinations on a semi-regular basis and offers charter services. All flights are from the Rose Bay Water Airport in Sydney's Eastern Suburbs.

- Palm Beach (Lilypad, Floating Accommodation)
- Whale Beach (Jonah's Restaurant)
- Cottage Point (Cottage Point Inn)
- Berowra Waters Inn
- Hawkesbury River (Peats Bite)
- Pittwater (Bert's Bar)
- Sydney Harbour Scenic, over Eastern Suburbs, Northern Beaches, CBD and return to Rose Bay

== Accidents ==
A major incident occurred on 31 December 2017, involving VH-NOO. The aircraft crashed into Jerusalem Bay off the Hawkesbury River after deviating from its usual flight path. All six people on board were killed in the crash (five passengers including an 11 year old girl and one crew, the pilot). The pilot was returning from Cottage Point Inn to the hub of Rose Bay. The ATSB determined the pilot was incapacitated from carbon monoxide poisoning, caused by exhaust gasses entering the cabin through holes in the firewall. The company that maintained the aircraft, Airag Aviation Services, was found to have left out bolts that secure the magneto access panels to the firewall, creating the pathway.
