= Scone Airport =

Scone Memorial Airport
- IATA: NSO; ICAO: YSCO

Summary
- Airport type: Public
- Owner: Upper Hunter Shire Council
- Operator: Upper Hunter Shire Council
- Serves: Hunter Valley
- Location: Scone, New South Wales
- Elevation AMSL: 745 ft (227 m)
- Coordinates: 32°02′14″S 150°49′56″E

Map
- Location in New South Wales

Runways
Direction	Length		Surface
Direction	m	ft	Surface
11/29	1,404	4,606	Asphalt
- Sources: Australian AIP and aerodrome chart

Scone Memorial Airport, (IATA: NSO, ICAO: YSCO) is a public airport in the Upper Hunter Valley, 4 km (2.5 mi) north-west of Scone, New South Wales, Australia. It was built to provide a public aerodrome replacing Nandowra aerodrome on located on Nandowra, approximately nine kilometres south of Scone.

== History ==
In 1937, No. 3 Squadron RAAF aircraft, including Hawker Demon and Avro Anson, together with an Aerodrome Defence Crew camped at Nandowra Aerodrome.

During World War II, the Royal Australian Air Force utilised Nandowra Aerodrome as an emergency landing ground.

Between 1988 and 2001, Yanda Airlines based an aircraft and pilots at Scone to operate commuter flights to Sydney via Cessnock, Singleton and Maitland. The company's fleet of PA-31 aircraft were also maintained by Scone Aircraft Maintenance at the airport until Yanda's grounding by the Civil Aviation Safety Authority.

== Current facilities ==
There are currently no airlines serving Scone.

The airport is home to several businesses providing a range of services. These include: Scone Aero Club, a social club and Ultralight Flight Training Facility approved to conduct Recreational Aviation Australia instructor training and which organised the Warbirds Over Scone series of airshows in 1998, 2001 and 2003; Pay's Air Charter and the Warbird Museum Airspeed Aviation, a charter operator and flying school; Scone Aircraft Maintenance, an approved aircraft maintenance facility; and AirPasture, an aerial application business.

In 2010, an agreement between the Upper Hunter Shire, State Government and local business owners secured up to $2 million in funding to update and expand the airport facilities. The upgrades include improved drainage, a runway extension and a new taxiway. The runway extension was completed by May 2011. The Upper Hunter Shire has expressed an interest in attracting commuter airline services to the upgraded airport.

== Accidents and incidents ==
- On 31 October 1982, a de Havilland DH-82 Tiger Moth preparing for a display formation involving two other aircraft crashed shortly after takeoff and was destroyed by the post impact fire, killing both the pilot and passenger. The cause of the crash was determined to be a combination of factors attributed to pilot error.
