= Aircruising Australia =

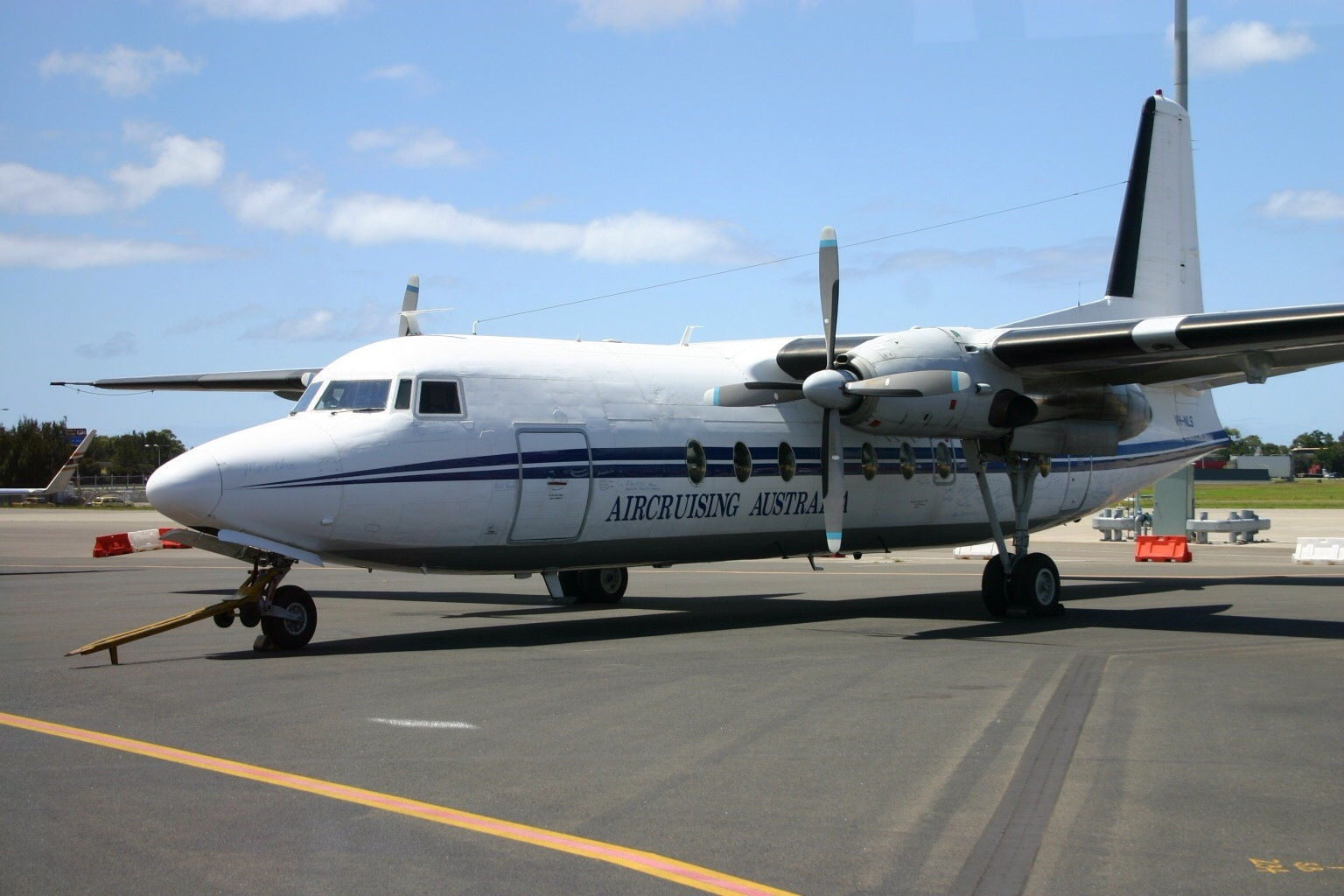
- Aircruising Australia Fokker F27 Friendship
IATA	ICAO	Call sign
–	AIX	CRUISER
- Founded: 1983
- Hubs: Sydney Airport
- Fleet size: 1 (leased)
- Headquarters: Sydney
- Key people: Neville Salisbury (founder)
- Website: www.aircruising.com.au

Aircruising Australia Limited (ASX: AIG) is an airline based in Sydney, Australia. It operates air cruises/sightseeing trips as well as charter flights around Australia and New Zealand. Its main base is Sydney Airport.

The company was renamed Bill Peach Group in 2014.

== History ==
The airline was established by Neville Salisbury and started operations in 1983. It was known as Charter Cruise Air until 1994.

== Fleet ==
The airline no longer operates aircraft directly, chartering them instead from companies including Skytrans Airlines, but in the past years operated Fokker F27 Friendship.

== See also ==
- List of airlines of Australia
