= Rose Bay Water Airport =

Water airport in Rose Bay in Sydney, New South Wales

Rose Bay Water Airport Sydney–Rose Bay
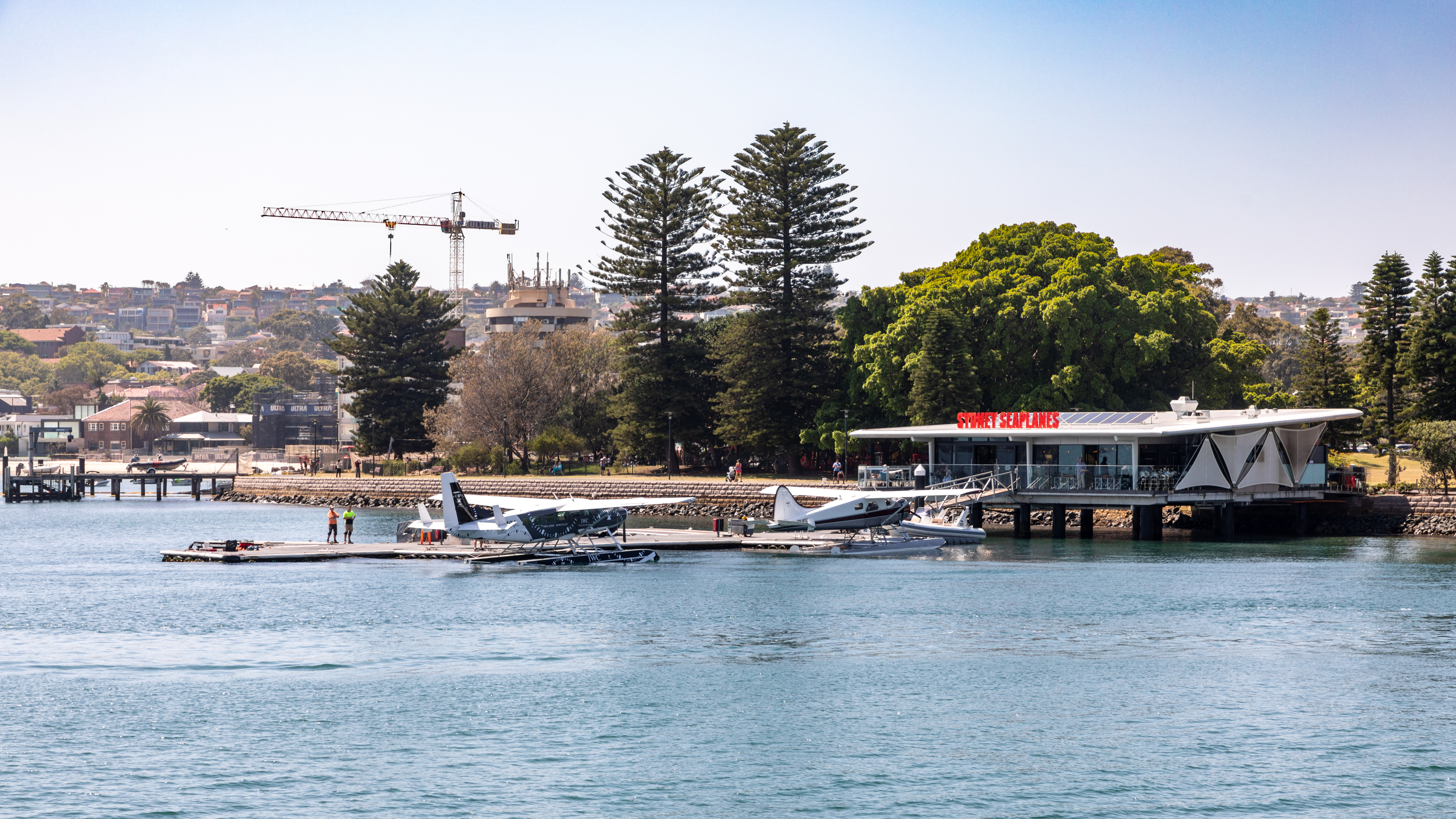
- IATA: RSE; ICAO: YRAY

Summary
- Airport type: Public
- Serves: Sydney
- Location: Rose Bay, New South Wales, Australia
- Opened: 4 August 1938
- Time zone: AEST (+10:00)
  - Summer (DST): AEDT (+11:00)
- Coordinates: 33°52′12″S 151°15′47″E
- Interactive map of Rose Bay Water Airport
- Aerodrome reference point: Airservices Australia

Rose Bay Water Airport (IATA: RSE), also known as Sydney Water Airport, is a water airport located in the Sydney suburb of Rose Bay, New South Wales, Australia. Its shore facilities are at Lyne Park, on Sydney Harbour, and it is used for scenic flights and charter services.

Established in 1938, Rose Bay was Sydney's first international airport and the Australian terminus of the Short Empire flying boat service operated by Qantas Empire Airways and Imperial Airways to Britain. It also served Tasman Empire Airways, Trans Oceanic Airways and Ansett. During World War II it supported military transport and aircraft maintenance. Qantas withdrew its flying boats in 1955; Ansett's scheduled service to Lord Howe Island continued until September 1974. Smaller seaplanes continue to operate from the bay.

== History ==
=== Establishment ===
The development of the airport followed Australia's agreement in January 1937 to join the Empire Air Mail Scheme. Rose Bay was selected that year as the Australian terminus despite opposition from some local residents. Botany Bay was considered as an alternative, but would have required a costly breakwater and several years of construction. The base occupied land at Lyne Park previously used as a naval recreation area.

The original terminal, designed by the Government Architect, combined passenger accommodation with a control office overlooking the water. Its Art Deco design included a curved balcony and glazed control room on the upper floor. Qantas's maintenance hangar was completed in October 1939. Aircraft moored offshore, with passengers transferred between the terminal and flying boats by launch.

=== Qantas and Imperial Airways ===
Flying boat services began before the airport's formal inauguration. On 5 July 1938, the Short Empire Cooee left Rose Bay on the first through flying boat service to Britain. Qantas crews operated the Sydney–Singapore section, with Imperial Airways responsible for the onward journey to Southampton.

The route followed Australia's east coast before crossing northern Australia and the Dutch East Indies to Singapore. The journey to Southampton took about nine and a half days, with overnight stops on land. The flying boats carried both mail and passengers, who had access to separate cabins, reclining seats and an onboard meal service. Qantas moved its headquarters from Brisbane to Sydney with the introduction of the service.

On 4 August 1938, Rose Bay Water Airport was officially opened. The ceremony was performed by Lord Huntingfield, the acting governor-general. The full thrice-weekly Empire Air Mail Scheme service from Sydney began on 9 August, with Coriolanus. Rose Bay became Sydney's first international airport.

=== Second World War ===
At the outbreak of war in 1939, Qantas's flying boat service was suspended for six days before airmail flights to Singapore resumed. After Italy entered the war, the link with Britain was reorganised: Qantas extended its operations to Karachi, and British Overseas Airways Corporation carried mail via Cairo to Durban, from where it travelled to Britain by sea. This became known as the Horseshoe route.

Tasman Empire Airways Limited (TEAL) began its service between Mechanics Bay in Auckland and Rose Bay on 30 April 1940. Its inaugural flight carried ten passengers. TEAL maintained the trans-Tasman service during the war.

The Japanese advance through South-East Asia severed the Singapore route in February 1942. Rose Bay's facilities were used by the Royal Australian Air Force for the repair and overhaul of Allied aircraft. Wartime flying boat operations included services to Nouméa and the transport of personnel, cargo and mail along the east coast to New Guinea. Women were among the Qantas employees engaged in wartime support work at Rose Bay.

Two Empire flying boats operated by Qantas were lost in landing accidents at Rose Bay in 1944. Clifton sank on 18 January, and Coolangatta crashed on 11 October, killing one passenger. After the war, the base received repatriated prisoners of war. On 16 September 1945, Catalinas brought members of the 8th Division from Singapore; crowds met them at Rose Bay before they were taken to the 113th General Hospital for medical examination.

=== Post-war services ===
Flying boat services between Britain and Australia resumed in May 1946 and ended in 1949, as faster Lockheed Constellation landplanes took over the route. The expansion of land-based airports during the war and improvements in landplanes reduced the advantages of flying boats.

Trans Oceanic Airways (TOA) began a passenger service from Rose Bay to Lord Howe Island on 1 August 1947. Qantas introduced a competing Catalina service that December, replacing the Catalinas with Sandringhams in 1950. In 1951 Qantas withdrew from Lord Howe Island and TOA withdrew from Nouméa.

On 27 August 1949, Qantas Catalina VH-EAW was destroyed by an explosion at its Rose Bay moorings. Police investigated after a device incorporating an alarm clock and battery was recovered from the wreckage.

TEAL replaced its Auckland–Sydney flying boat service with Douglas DC-6 landplanes in 1954. In 1955, Qantas discontinued its flying boat service.

=== Ansett and the end of scheduled flying boat services ===
Ansett Airways commenced operating services to Lord Howe Island in 1953. Ansett Flying Boat Services took over TOA in May, enabling it to concentrate at Rose Bay the operations acquired from TOA and Barrier Reef Airways.

Flying boat operations depended on a fleet of control launches, workboats and fuel launches. Control launches checked the water for debris and marked the area used for take-offs and landings; floating flare buoys marked it at night.

Ansett's Sandringham Beachcomber, VH-BRC, operated the last return passenger flying boat service to Lord Howe Island on 10 September 1974. The island's new land airport allowed the route to be served by landplanes. The hangars at Rose Bay were dismantled in 1977 and their site returned to parkland. A commemorative plaque was installed at Lyne Park in 1988, marking fifty years since the start of the Qantas and Imperial Airways flying boat service.

== Facilities ==
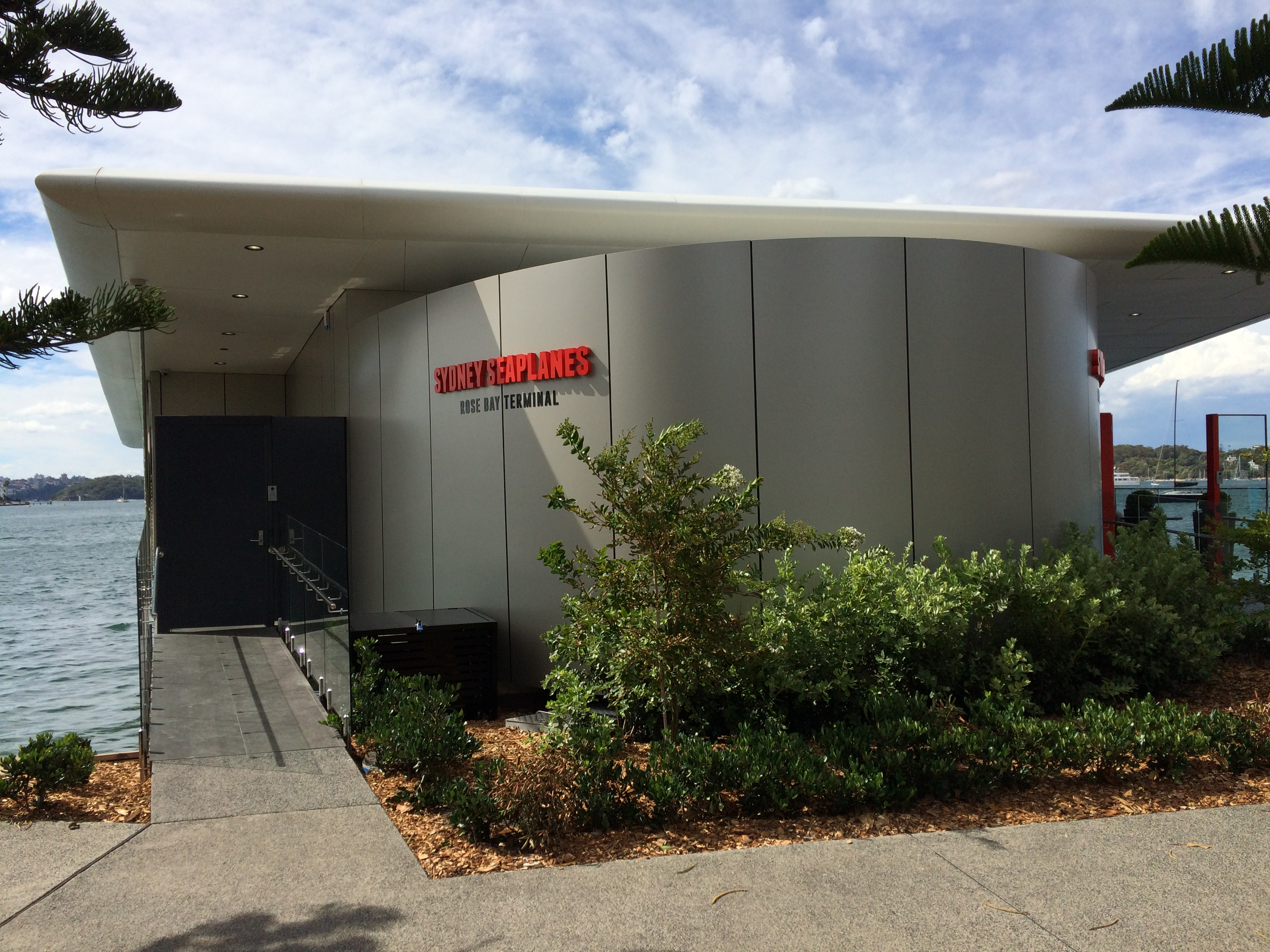
The Sydney Seaplanes terminal building

The airport has an unmarked water alighting area within Rose Bay. Its northern boundary runs from Woollahra Point to Shark Island and then to Steel Point. Published noise-abatement procedures require aircraft operations to remain over water.

Sydney Seaplanes operates from a terminal at Lyne Park beside Rose Bay ferry wharf. A replacement terminal opened in October 2016, jointly funded by Sydney Seaplanes and Roads & Maritime Services through the Maritime Waterways Fund. The building incorporated passenger facilities, the Empire Lounge, a restaurant and a display of flying boat history.

== Airlines and destinations ==
Sydney Seaplanes offers a series of tour packages, as well as scenic flights. It also offers private charter flights to destinations with suitable water or land landing facilities.

Sydney by Seaplane and Seawing Airways, which are both trading names of Krug Agencies Pty Ltd, offer scenic flights, private charters and excursions including Palm Beach and the Hunter Valley from Rose Bay.
