= Impulse Airlines =

Regional airline of Australia (1992–2004)

IATA	ICAO	Call sign
VQ	IPU	IMPULSE
- Founded: 1992
- Ceased operations: 25 May 2004 (relaunched as Jetstar)
- Parent company: Qantas (2001–2004)
- Headquarters: Mascot, New South Wales, Australia
- Founders: Gerry McGowan; Sue McGowan
- Website: impulse.com.au

Impulse Airlines was an Australian airline which operated regional and low-cost trunk services between 1992 and 2004. Founded by Gerry and Sue McGowan, it developed from a newspaper freight business into a regional passenger airline. In June 2000 it introduced Boeing 717 jets on major domestic routes, competing with Qantas and Ansett.

Following financial difficulties and the withdrawal of investor support, Impulse ended its independent interstate services in May 2001 and began operating for Qantas. Qantas bought the company in November 2001, and it operated under the QantasLink brand before becoming the basis of Jetstar, which began passenger services in May 2004.

== History ==
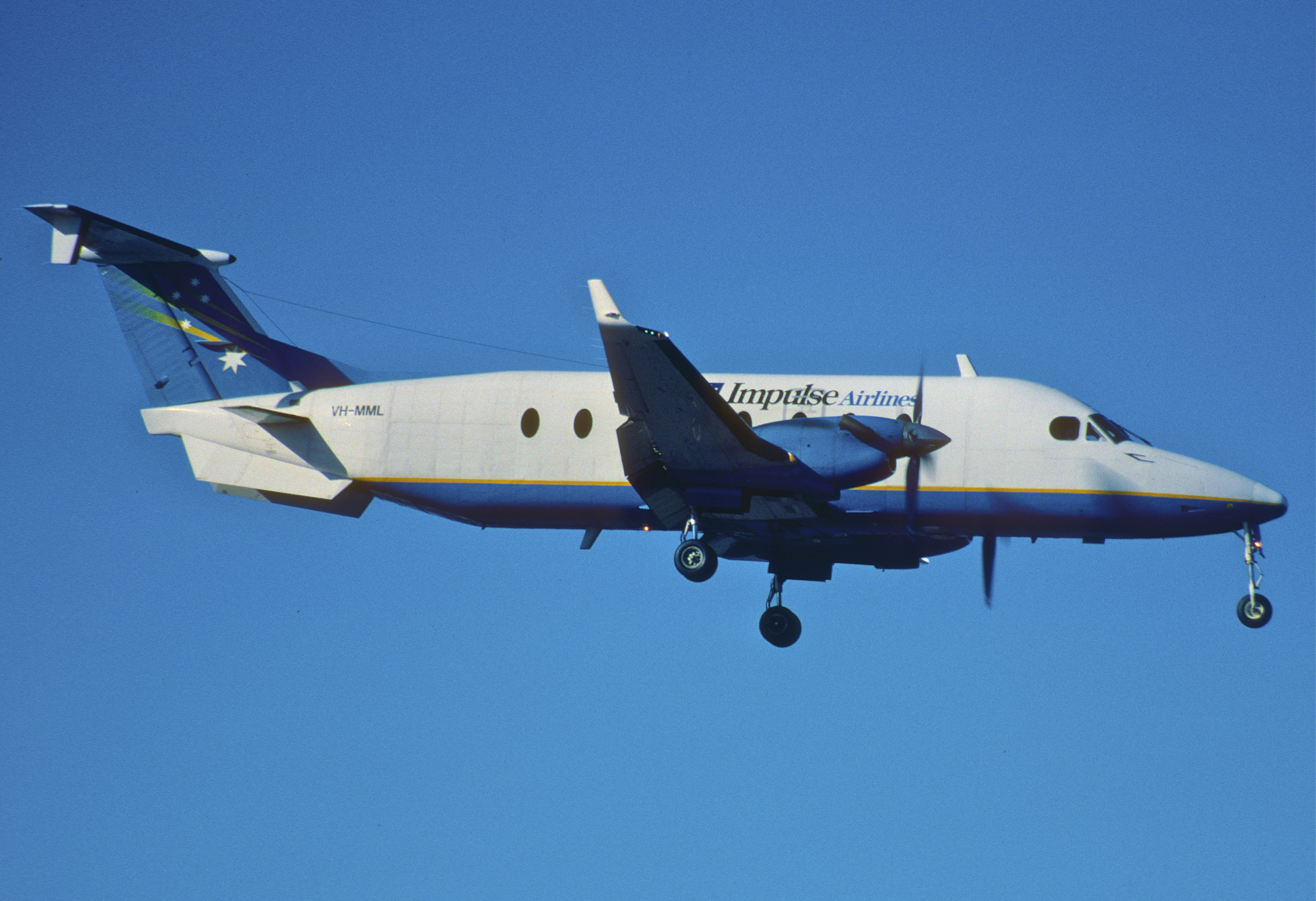
Impulse Airlines Beechcraft 1900D in August 1999

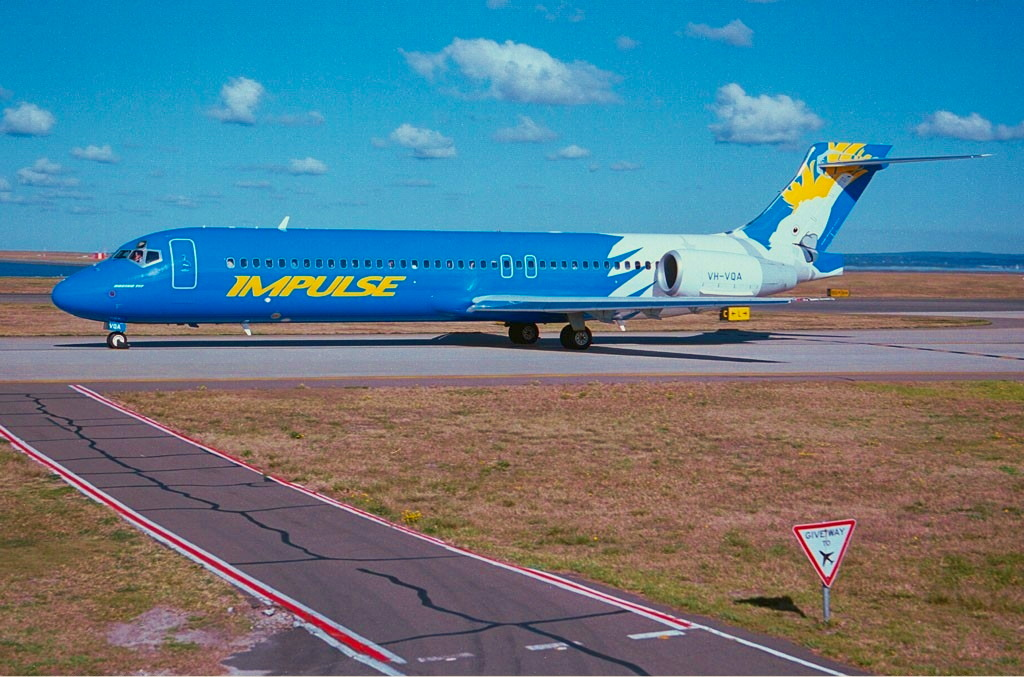
Impulse Airlines Boeing 717 in 2001

=== Establishment ===
Impulse Airlines was founded by Gerry and Sue McGowan in 1992 following the acquisition of Port Macquarie based Oxley Airlines. The McGowans' transport business had used aircraft to distribute Fairfax newspapers; Oxley chartered the aircraft for daytime passenger flights before encountering financial difficulties. In April 1994, it was rebranded as Impulse Airlines. In May 1994 Impulse purchased Pacific Aviation from Ansett Transport Industries.

It operated a network of regional routes throughout New South Wales and into Queensland. The airline operated a fleet of Beechcraft 1900 aircraft. It also flew to Victoria, carried newspapers for Fairfax and provided feeder traffic to Ansett under a commercial alliance.

The first of five BAe Jetstream 41 aircraft arrived in August 1994. Impulse began direct Newcastle–Melbourne services on 17 October 1994, but withdrew from the route on 9 July 1995. Its last Jetstream 41 flight was on 11 July 1995, after which the aircraft were returned to the manufacturer.

The airline was a major sponsor of the Newcastle Knights National Rugby League team.

=== Low-cost airline ===
In 1999, Ansett decided to end its commercial alliance with Impulse and concentrate its New South Wales regional links on Kendell Airlines and Hazelton Airlines. Impulse subsequently considered entering the east coast trunk market. In April 2000, Boeing announced that Impulse had arranged to lease five 717-200s, each with 117 economy-class seats. Its jet services began on 5 June 2000. The initial route was Sydney–Melbourne. By January 2001, the 717s also served Sydney–Brisbane. Hobart joined the network on 2 April 2001.

Before the launch, Impulse announced a $139 one-way fare for every seat on its Sydney–Melbourne flights and a $119 Sydney–Canberra fare. Qantas and Ansett matched these prices with non-refundable, non-transferable fares, describing the cuts as a normal competitive response. The Australian Competition and Consumer Commission (ACCC) said it would monitor the established airlines' conduct towards Impulse and Virgin Blue. Virgin Blue began flying in August 2000.

The airline gradually began to phase in a bright blue livery with a cockatoo on the tail of its aircraft.

=== Competition disputes ===
In December 1999, McGowan complained to the ACCC that Qantas was engaging in predatory conduct on the Newcastle–Melbourne route. He alleged that Qantas was adding capacity to an already marginal market, introducing 792 seats a week against Impulse's 1,062. Qantas deputy chief executive Geoff Dixon denied the allegation and said the expansion was part of an existing plan to develop Newcastle as a regional hub.

In August 2000, the ACCC concluded that there was no basis for action under the Trade Practices Act 1974 over Qantas's Newcastle–Melbourne and Newcastle–Brisbane expansion. It cited Qantas's pre-existing plans, its BHP contract and evidence of commercial viability. Although Impulse had redeployed its Newcastle–Melbourne aircraft, the commission found no indication of material damage to Impulse from the expansion.

Impulse's entry also prompted a dispute over facilities at Canberra Airport. In May 2000, Qantas withdrew from common security-screening and passenger-waiting arrangements ahead of Impulse's arrival. Airport owner Capital Airport Group began legal proceedings alleging breaches of Qantas's lease, and the ACCC examined the competition implications. Qantas said the dispute was with the airport owner and denied trying to restrict another airline's access.

The interstate fare war intensified in early 2001. In March, Qantas offered some Sydney–Melbourne fares as low as $36.50, while Impulse sold seats from $37. McGowan accused Qantas of trying to drive Impulse out by adding excessive capacity. In April he supported Virgin Blue's allegations that Qantas was flooding the market to force one or both new entrants out. Impulse reduced Sydney–Melbourne and Sydney–Brisbane frequencies and redeployed flights to Melbourne–Hobart. The ACCC said it was closely monitoring the airlines, although no formal complaint about that capacity expansion had then been made.

=== Acquisition by Qantas ===
By early 2001, the fare war and rising fuel costs had made Impulse unprofitable. It approached Qantas about an agreement, while its investors declined to provide further support. On 1 May 2001, the airlines announced an arrangement under which Impulse would cease selling services under its own name and operate for Qantas. The agreement involved a wet lease of Impulse's aircraft and crews, financial support from Qantas and an option to buy the airline.

Dixon rejected the suggestion that the arrangement was anti-competitive, pointing to continuing competition from Ansett and Virgin Blue. He said that $33 fares were unsustainable and that Impulse's aircraft would replace Qantas aircraft on existing services.

On 18 May, the ACCC announced that it would not oppose the transaction. It concluded that the acquisition would lessen competition, but that receivership would be a worse outcome, given Impulse's financial position and the absence of another buyer. Qantas gave undertakings concerning access to peak-period Sydney Airport slots and terminal facilities, and the maintenance of service frequency and capacity and restrictions on fare increases on routes served only by Qantas and Impulse. Virgin Blue chief executive Brett Godfrey nevertheless argued that the deal threatened low fares by strengthening Qantas's position.

Impulse ended independent interstate services on 22 May 2001. That day it announced cuts to 70 direct jobs and more than 130 contractor positions as Qantas took over airport handling. The cuts prompted staff protests. Qantas said Impulse had made the decision and that the agreement preserved most jobs that would otherwise have been lost.

Qantas exercised its option in November 2001, and Impulse was absorbed into QantasLink. The purchase was completed on 20 November for an undisclosed sum. By then, Impulse's eight Boeing 717s and 13 Beechcraft 1900Ds had been operating under the Qantas banner since May.

In April 2003, Rene Rivkin was found guilty of insider trading over the purchase of 50,000 Qantas shares before the Impulse deal was announced. He bought these shares on behalf of Rivkin Investments on 24 April 2001, just hours after speaking to the executive chairman of Impulse, Gerry McGowan.

=== Jetstar ===
Impulse subsequently provided the operating company, aircraft and employment agreements for Qantas's new low-cost airline, Jetstar. In Mayday, journalist Matt O'Sullivan identified Impulse's lower labour costs as a central attraction of the acquisition: its pilots and cabin crew remained employed by the subsidiary on conditions different from those at Qantas. O'Sullivan quoted Dixon as saying, "We went very aggressively to get Impulse when we knew it was in trouble."

Qantas approved the new low-cost airline project in October 2003. The use of Impulse's employment agreements raised concerns among unions that Jetstar could be used to reduce wages and conditions elsewhere in the Qantas group. The Flight Attendants Association of Australia, however, said Qantas appeared willing to negotiate and that the outcome would depend on the routes and aircraft chosen.

Impulse Airlines Pty Limited changed its name to Jetstar Airways Pty Limited on 23 December 2003. Jetstar began passenger services on 25 May 2004, with its inaugural flight from Newcastle to Melbourne. Its initial fleet consisted of 14 Boeing 717s, with Airbus A320s to follow.

The facilities developed by Impulse Airlines for its Newcastle base continued to be used as a heavy maintenance base for Jetstar. In June 2020, Jetstar announced that the base would close and its work would move to Melbourne.

== Fleet ==
The fleet contracted to Qantas in 2001 comprised 21 aircraft:

Impulse Airlines fleet in 2001
Aircraft	In Fleet
Boeing 717-200	8
Beechcraft 1900D	13
Total	21

Earlier aircraft included the Beech 99, Beechcraft 1900C, British Aerospace Jetstream 41 and Hawker Siddeley HS 748.
