= Compass Airlines (Australia) =

Low cost airline in Australia, 1990–1993

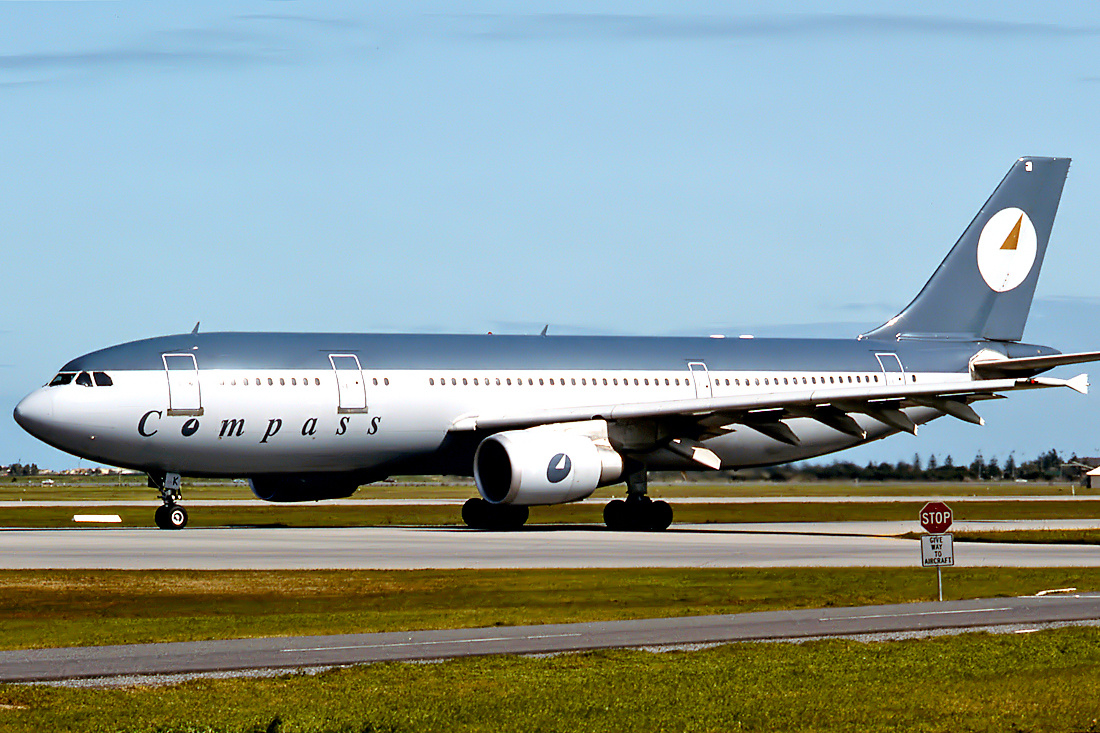
- Airbus A300 at Adelaide Airport in August 1991
IATA	ICAO	Call sign
YM	CYM	COMPAIR
- Commenced operations: Mark 1: 1 December 1990; Mark 2: 31 August 1992
- Ceased operations: Mark 1: 20 December 1991; Mark 2: 4 March 1993
- Fleet size: Mark 1: 5 Mark 2: 5
- Key people: Bryan Grey

Compass Airlines operated in Australia for two brief periods in the early 1990s. The two incarnations of the airline were quite separate with different management and aircraft.

== History ==
Compass I was Australia's first low cost airline. It was established following deregulation of the Australian airline industry in 1990. Previously Ansett and the government-owned Australian Airlines had operated under the Two Airlines Policy, which was in fact a legal barrier to new entrants to the Australian aviation market. It restricted intercapital services to the two major domestic carriers. This anti-competitive arrangement ensured that they carried approximately the same number of passengers, charged the same fares and had similar fleet sizes and equipment.

== Compass Mark I ==
Compass Airlines, later referred to as Compass Mark I was established by Bryan Grey, who had previously run regional airline East-West Airlines.

East-West had earlier attempted to break the duopoly of Ansett and Australian Airlines by offering cheap fares but in the regulated environment of the time was not allowed to operate directly between major cities so was forced to detour via regional centres. East-West was ultimately acquired by Ansett.

Compass commenced operating between Brisbane, Sydney, Melbourne and Perth on 1 December 1990. In July 1991 it commenced serving Adelaide.

At its peak Compass Mark I operated four leased Airbus A300s and a single A310. Two aircraft were leased from British charter carrier Monarch Airlines and one from Canadian Airlines International.

Compass Mark I collapsed on 20 December 1991, with Ferrier Hodgson appointed as administrator. The reasons being portrayed as undercapitalisation, sustained fare discounting by its competitors and failing to make use of its potential to also carry freight.

The Federal Government made it extremely difficult for the new airline to succeed, as evidenced by the lack of suitable facilities provided to Compass. In the major cities, the fledgling carrier was forced to accept what were the least accessible aircraft parking bays inside the terminal of one of their competitors, an impediment to successful trade also noted by the government's own Australian Competition & Consumer Commission study. Compass Airlines' initial operations were also significantly disrupted by what appeared to be a computer attack on their reservations system.

As the official findings of the Australian Taxation Office detail, the federal government set in place legal proceedings that inevitably led to the repossession of the leased aircraft and the effective grounding of the airline, with the subsequent direct and indirect loss of thousands of jobs.

The government and Compass had been in dispute for many months over the amount paid for the provision of services provided by the governmental authority the Civil Aviation Safety Authority. Although this dispute had been ongoing, the Government chose to act just before the peak 1991 Christmas traveling period. At 21:00 on 20 December 1991, Compass Airlines was grounded. The underlying issues remained unresolved until a final High Court of Australia hearing in 1999. It was argued, had the airline been allowed to continue trading over the Christmas period, the peak travel season in Australia, it would have had more of a chance meeting its disputed financial obligations than being shut down at this point in time.

== Compass Mark II ==
Compass Mark II was originally conceived as Southern Cross Airlines but chose to trade under the Compass brand, which seemed to have popular support. This may have been a commercial error as many suppliers required Compass Mark II to purchase items and pay up front, rather than lease the same items as would normally be the case.

It commenced operations on 31 August 1992 with three McDonnell Douglas MD-82 and two McDonnell Douglas MD-83 aircraft. It collapsed on 4 March 1993 with Price Waterhouse appointed administrator. Operations ceased on 11 March 1993. Two further MD83 aircraft were on order when Compass collapsed. Southern Cross chairman Douglas Reid was convicted in 1997 of theft and false accounting amounting to $10 million in relation to the collapse. He received a record 10-year jail sentence.

== Fleet ==
Compass Mark I

- 4 Airbus A300B4-605R
- 1 Airbus A310-304

Compass Mark II

- 3 McDonnell Douglas MD-82
- 2 McDonnell Douglas MD-83
