= List of airports in Tasmania =

This is a list of current registered airports in the Australian state of Tasmania.

== List of airports ==
The list is sorted by the name of the community served, click the sort buttons in the table header to switch listing order. Airports named in bold are Designated International Airports, even if they have limited or no scheduled international services.

Community	Airport name	Type	ICAO	IATA	Coordinates	Image
Bridport	Bridport Airport	Public	YBDP		41°01′19″S 147°24′25″E	
Bruny Island	Bruny Island Airport	Public	YBYI		43°14′3″S 147°22′48″E	
Cambridge, Hobart	Cambridge Aerodrome	Public	YCBG		42°49′36″S 147°28′30″E	
Cambridge, Hobart	**Hobart Airport**	Public	YMHB	HBA	42°50′12″S 147°30′36″E	
Cape Barren Island	Cape Barren Island Airport	Public	YCBN	CBI	40°23′30″S 148°1′1″E	
Currie	King Island Airport	Public	YKII	KNS	39°52′39″S 143°52′42″E	
Devonport	Devonport Airport	Public	YDPO	DPO	41°10′11″S 146°25′49″E	
George Town	George Town Aerodrome	Private	YGTO	GEE	41°04′48″S 146°50′24″E	
Lady Barron	Lady Barron Aerodrome	Public	YLDB		40°11′45″S 148°14′44″E	
Launceston	**Launceston Airport**	Public	YMLT	LST	41°32′42″S 147°12′54″E	
Queenstown	Queenstown Airport	Public	YQNS	UEE	42°04′32″S 145°31′51″E	
Smithton	Smithton Airport	Public	YSMI	SIO	40°50′06″S 145°05′00″E	
St Helens	St Helens Airport	Public	YSTH	HLS	41°20′12″S 148°16′54″E	
Strahan	Strahan Airport	Public	YSRN	SRN	42°09′20″S 145°17′29″E	
Whitemark	Flinders Island Airport	Public	YFLI	FLS	40°05′29″S 147°59′34″E	
Wynyard	Burnie Airport	Public	YWYY	BWT	40°59′56″S 145°43′52″E	

Note that some unregistered landing grounds in Tasmania, such as Queenstown Airport, are still listed in international coding systems, usually as private aerodromes.

== See also ==
- List of airports in Australia
