= Par Avion (airline) =

Australian airline

IATA	ICAO	Call sign
FO	ATM	AIRTAS
- Founded: 1978
- Operating bases: Cambridge Aerodrome
- Fleet size: 13
- Destinations: 3 (scheduled)
- Headquarters: Hobart, Tasmania, Australia
- Employees: 40
- Website: www.paravion.com.au

Par Avion, formerly Airlines of Tasmania, is a regional airline based in Hobart, Tasmania, Australia. It operates scheduled services across Tasmania and charter services. It owns and operates Cambridge Aerodrome, a flying training school which is affiliated with the University of Tasmania and a tourism business into the Southwest National Park, including day and overnight trips to Bathurst Harbour.

== History ==
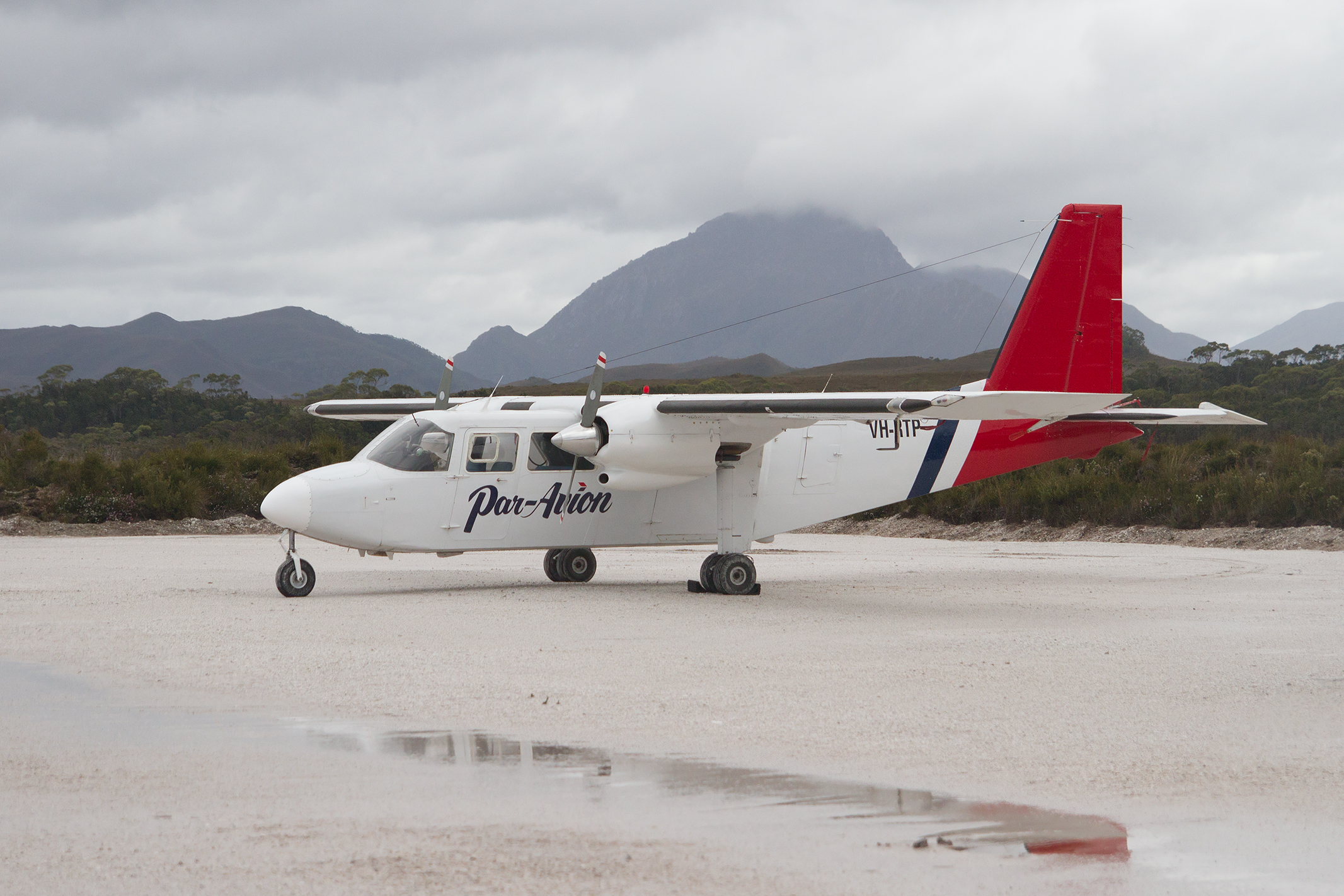
Par-Avion Britten-Norman BN-2 Islander on the Melaleuca Airstrip in the South West Wilderness

Airlines of Tasmania was established in 1978. During its early years, the company had regular services to the West Coast from Queenstown and Strahan.

In 1984 Par Avion Wilderness Tours was established specialising in flights and tours to the South West Wilderness. In November 1989, it launched a Launcestion to Melbourne Essendon service with four Aérospatiale N 262s. In 1992, it purchased Cambridge Aerodrome from the Federal Airports Corporation.

In 2004–2005 there was a service between Hobart and Strahan, but this service ceased due to marginal traffic. Early in 2008, the airline moved its Melbourne operations from Moorabbin Airport to Essendon Airport, due to the airline upgrading its fleet by introducing the Dornier 228.

In October 2010, Sharp Airlines took over all scheduled operations to Flinders Island. In July 2012, Sharp Airlines took over all scheduled operations to King Island. In December 2013, the airline announced a partnership with the University of Tasmania, for flying training study as part of a tertiary qualification and is a registered training organisation.

In February 2014, the airline announced it was intending to expand into the mainland and commence regular services from Essendon to Griffith. Following approval by the Civil Aviation Safety Authority, the airline announced the first services would begin on 17 March, under the Par Avion brand. The airline used Cessna 404 Titan aircraft on the route. The airline has since dropped the route.

In September 2015 the airline announced it would introduce a new service from Hobart (Cambridge Aerodrome) to King Island via Wynyard and in partnership with Sharp Airlines. Flights commenced in November using 6-9 passenger seating Piper Navajo and the occasional service using Cessna 404 weeks before the route was dropped. Airlines of Tasmania / Par Avion Airlines would fly from Cambridge Aerodrome to Wynyard, passengers could then board a Sharp Airlines flight to connect with King Island. Flights operated twice daily on Monday, Wednesday and Friday. Flights were suspended in late 2015 due to poor passenger numbers.

Par Avion entered the Tasmanian Tourism Hall of Fame in 1999 (Tour and Transport Operator - Significant) and again in 2016 (Major Tour and Transport Operator) and won the 2014, Australian Tourism Award for Major Tour and Transport Operator (receiving Silver in 2016) for its tourism operations around Tasmania

In May 2019, Par Avion commenced airline services to Strahan from Hobart / Cambridge, with assistance of a Government of Tasmania grant, with services three times a week using a Cessna Titan, this service was again terminated at the end of the grant due to unsustainable passenger numbers.

== Destinations ==
The sightseeing flights under the Par Avion branding are conducted from the Cambridge Aerodrome base near Hobart.

In May 2019, the company commenced services to Strahan three times a week, and Hobart to Launceston twice a week Par Avion provides chartered flights and as of November 2019, provides scheduled passenger services to the following locations:

- Hobart-Cambridge
- Launceston Airport
- Cape Barren Island

Par Avion has previously operated to King Island, Flinders Island, Strahan, Burnie, Melbourne/Essendon and Griffith

== Fleet ==
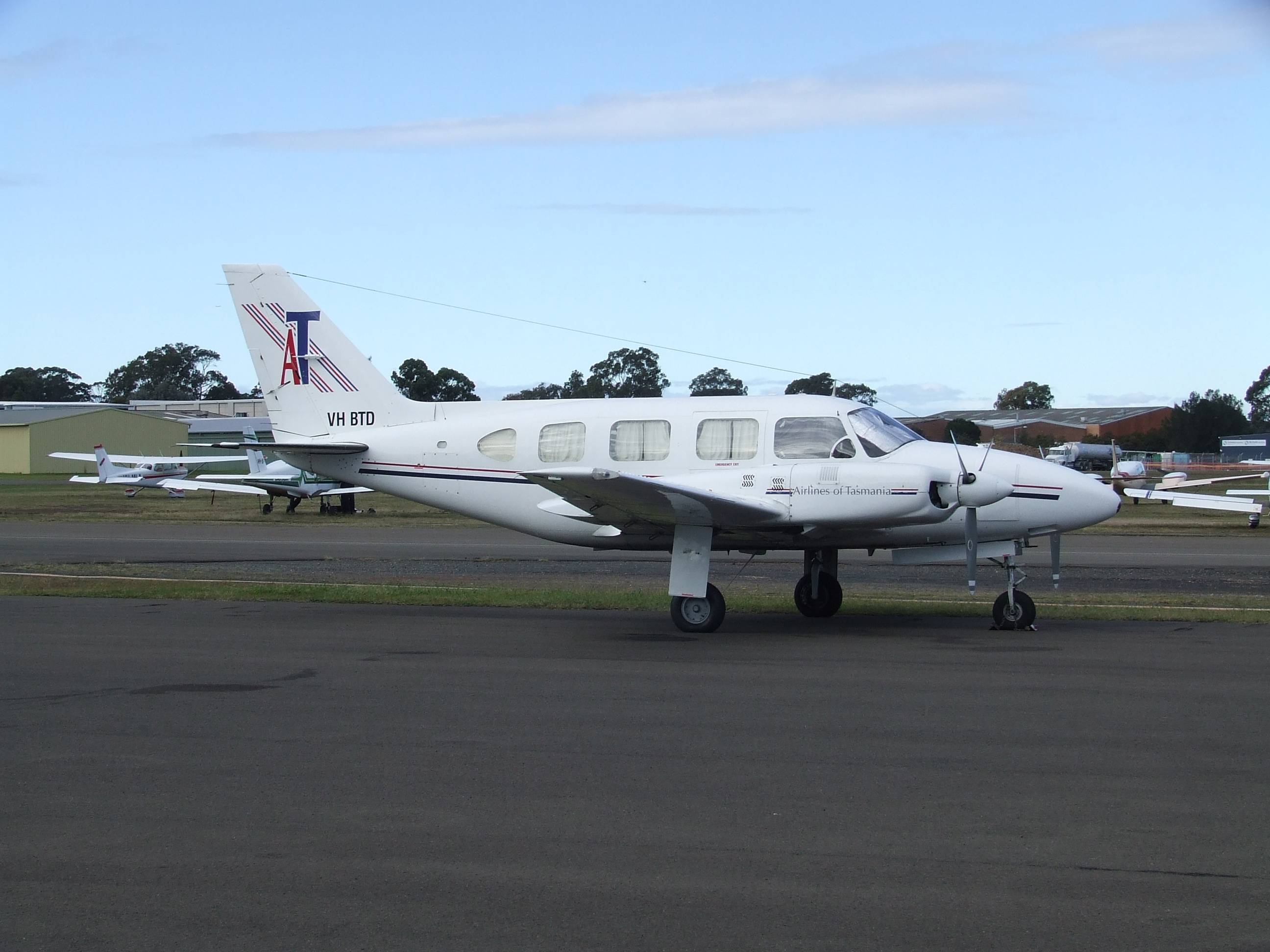
An Airlines of Tasmania Piper PA-31 Navajo

As of April 2025, the Airlines of Tasmania fleet consists of the following aircraft:

Airlines of Tasmania fleet
Aircraft	In service	Notes
Britten-Norman Islander	1	VH-ZOU
Cessna 172S	6	VH-EOK VH-EOX VH-PRJ VH-TSP VH-TSR VH-USQ
Cessna 206H	1	VH-IDF (Leased)
Cessna U206G	2	VH-MRK VH-MYS
Cessna 404 Titan	1	VH-WZM
PAC CT/4 Airtrainer	1	VH-YCX
Piper PA-31 Navajo	1	VH-BTI
Total	13	

== Accidents and incidents ==
The company has been involved in two separate fatal accidents.

- A Par-Avion Britten Norman Islander airplane impacted terrain near Federation Peak and the Western Arthur Range in December 2018 which resulted in the death of the pilot.
- A Cessna 172 impacted the ocean off the Tasman Peninsula in December 2014 resulting in the death of the company pilot and one passenger

== See also ==
- List of airlines of Australia
