= Hobart Airport =

Airport in Hobart, Tasmania, Australia

Hobart International Airport

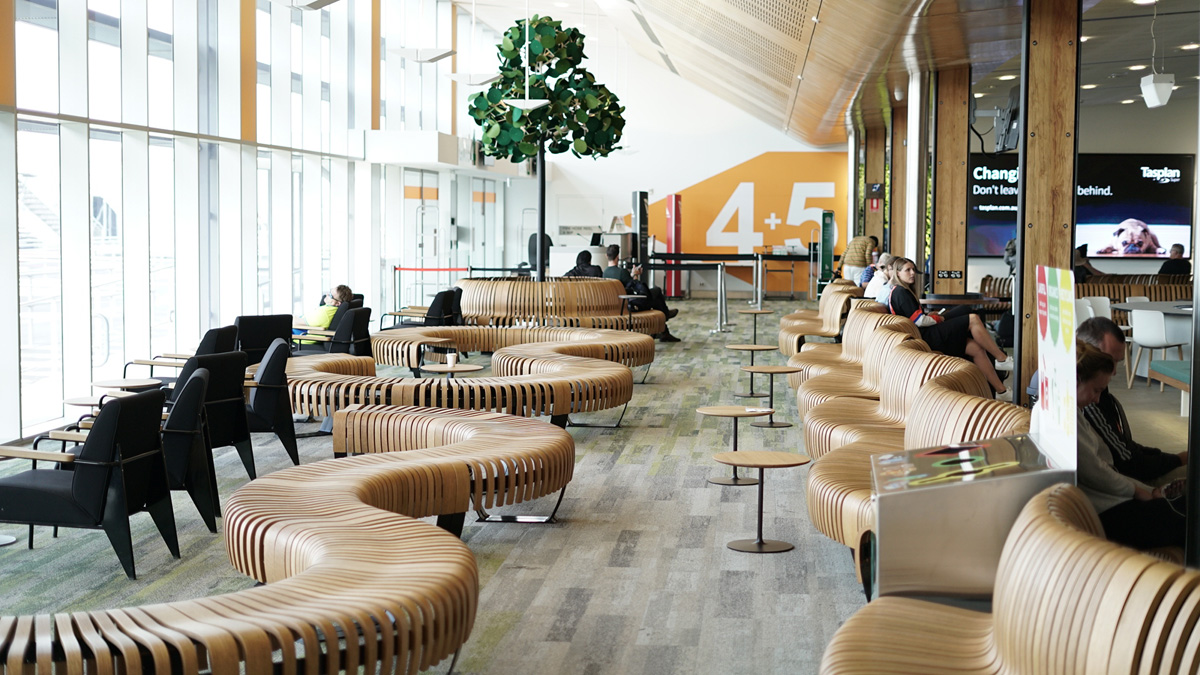
- Hobart Airport departures lounge featuring gates 4 and 5
- IATA: HBA; ICAO: YMHB; WMO: 94975

Summary
- Airport type: Public
- Owner: Queensland Investment Corporation (35%); Schiphol Group (35%); CareSuper (30%)
- Operator: Hobart Airport Pty Ltd
- Serves: Hobart
- Location: Cambridge, Tasmania, Australia
- Opened: 1956; 70 years ago
- Elevation AMSL: 13 ft (4.0 m)
- Coordinates: 42°50′12″S 147°30′36″E
- Website: www.hobartairport.com.au

Map
- Interactive map of Hobart International Airport

Runways
Direction	Length		Surface
Direction	m	ft	Surface
12/30	2,727	8,947	Asphalt

Statistics (2024-25)
- Passengers: 2,801,784
- Aircraft operations: 19,853
- Source: AIP passengers from the Department of Infrastructure & Transport; Operations from Airservices Australia

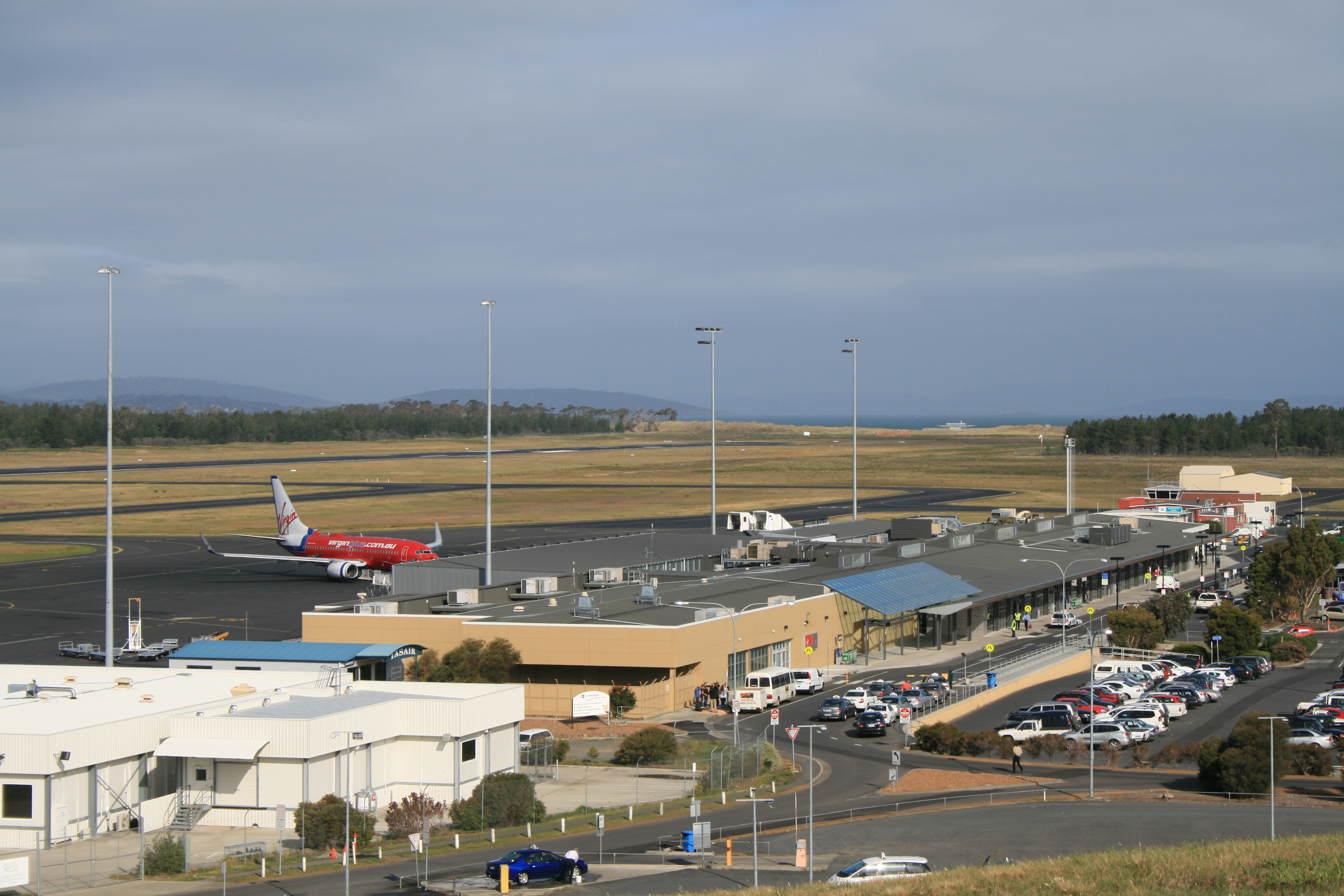
Main terminal

Hobart International Airport (IATA: HBA, ICAO: YMHB) (formerly known as Llanherne Airport) is an airport located in Cambridge, 17 km (11 mi) north-east of the Hobart central business district. It is the principal airport of Tasmania.

The federal government owned airport is operated by the Tasmanian Gateway Consortium under a 99-year lease.

The airport maintains a conjoined international and domestic terminal. The major airlines servicing the airport are Qantas, Jetstar and Virgin Australia operating domestic flights predominantly to Melbourne, Sydney and Brisbane.

Due to the airport's southern location, Skytraders operates regular flights to Antarctica on behalf of the Australian Antarctic Division using an Airbus A319.

Hobart Airport was opened in 1956 and privatised in 1988. Occupying approximately 565 ha (1,400 acres) of land, the airport is situated on a narrow peninsula. Take-offs and landings are inevitably directed over bodies of water regardless of approach or departure direction. The region immediately surrounding the airport remains largely unpopulated, which enables the airport to operate curfew-free services.

== History ==
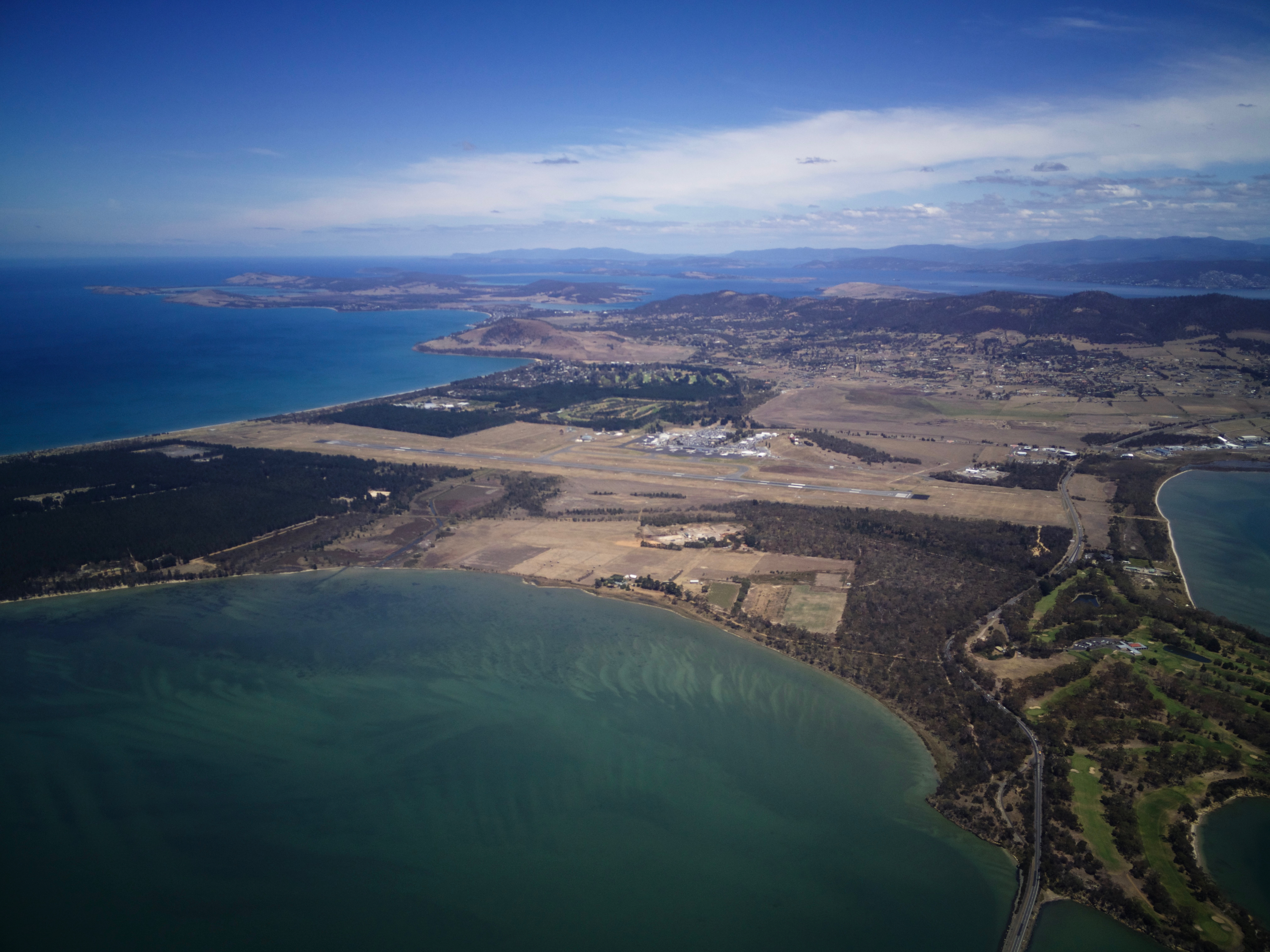
Hobart Airport seen from above

Prior to the existence of the airport, the region was served by Cambridge Airport, a small airport located close to the existing site. As air travel became more frequent and the number of flights increased, it was clear that Cambridge airport was only suitable for light aircraft. In June 1948, Prime Minister Ben Chifley announced the construction of a new AU£760,000 airport at Llanherne. With Australia's continual interest in Antarctica, it was believed the southernmost airport of Australia would serve as an ideal base for heavy aircraft serving the region. Hobart Airport was commissioned in 1956 as the primary regular public transport airport. It was initially named Llanherne Airport, after the property on which it was built, but the name has since fallen into disuse. In its first full year of operation, the airport processed 120,086 passengers and 11,724 tonnes of freight, ranking fifth in Australia.

By 1957, the airport's infrastructure comprised a small terminal building which remains at the south-eastern end of the current terminal, two freight hangars, a fuel depot, a timber weather station, and the airport administration office and works compound. In 1964, the Federal Government upgraded and lengthened the runway to cater for jet aircraft. The runway was extended again in 1985 to cater for large aircraft such as the Boeing 747 and Antonov 124 (albeit to a limited operating range). The current domestic terminal building was officially opened on 28 July 1976 and the international terminal building in 1986. The Federal Government corporatised the airport in January 1988 with the establishment of the Federal Airports Corporation.

=== Privatisation ===
In June 1998, Hobart Airport was privatised, with a 99-year lease purchased by a consortium of Hobart Ports Corporation, Hambros Australia and Airport Group International. In 2004, the domestic terminal was redeveloped for the first time in its 30-year history. This development involved modernising the terminal, moving the retail shops to within the security screening area, realignment of the car park and moving the car rental facilities to a new building in the car park. In 2005, Hobart Airport experienced record annual passenger numbers and it was decided to bring forward plans to upgrade the seating capacity of the airport. This work expanded the domestic terminal building over the tarmac by three metres to provide more departure lounge space.

In December 2007, the Tasmanian Government sold the TasPorts owned subsidiary for $350 million to the Tasmanian Gateway Consortium, a private consortium made up of Macquarie Capital (one of Macquarie Group's infrastructure funds) and Tasmania's public sector superannuation fund, the Tasplan. The sale was in line with other state capital airport sell-offs, and Hobart airport was the last capital city airport remaining under government control. In October 2019, Macquarie Capital sold its stake to Queensland Investment Corporation and Schiphol Group.

In February 2024, Hutchinson Builders began work to double the size of the terminal. In July 2024, work began to upgrade the runway to accommodate Airbus A350 and Boeing 787s. The runway upgrade was completed in August 2025.

== Terminals ==
Hobart Airport has a combined Domestic and International passenger terminal. In 2008, the airport received a commendation for public architecture at the Tasmanian Chapter of the Australian Institute of Architects, for the new terminal upgrade that combined the previously separate Domestic and International Terminal. The airport also currently maintains a combined international, domestic and general aviation apron. Provisions have been made to create a dedicated general aviation apron to the south of the one currently in use.

=== Passenger terminal ===
The current terminal was opened in 1976 as domestic only and has been expanded several times since. All airlines share the same check in and departure area towards the south-eastern end of the building. A Qantas Club is located airside within the departures area, with provision for an expanded lounge for both Qantas and Virgin Australia in the master plan. The arrivals hall for all airlines is located at the north-western end of the building and contains two baggage carousels. The easternmost of the baggage carousels can be secured for use by international arrivals. The domestic apron has six parking bays for narrow-body (Airbus A320/Boeing 737-sized) aircraft, with three additional parking bays located toward the northern end of the domestic apron. To allow for the return of International flights in 2021, gate 6 at the south eastern end of the terminal was converted into an international swing gate, allowing for both domestic and international departures.

Upgrades to the terminal commenced in 2024, with a new security screening point opening in late 2025, along with a Relay convenience store. Hungry Jack's has announced it will be opening an outlet at the airport in 2026.

=== Previous international terminal ===
The international terminal was opened in 1983 to facilitate Trans-Tasman air traffic, although, international flights began at the airport in December 1980 with Ansett and TAA offering services to New Zealand. In 1985 the terminal was upgraded, along with the runway, to provide limited 747 operations. Between 1998 and 2020, no regular international flights serviced the airport after Air New Zealand suspended their operations from Christchurch.

=== Freight ===
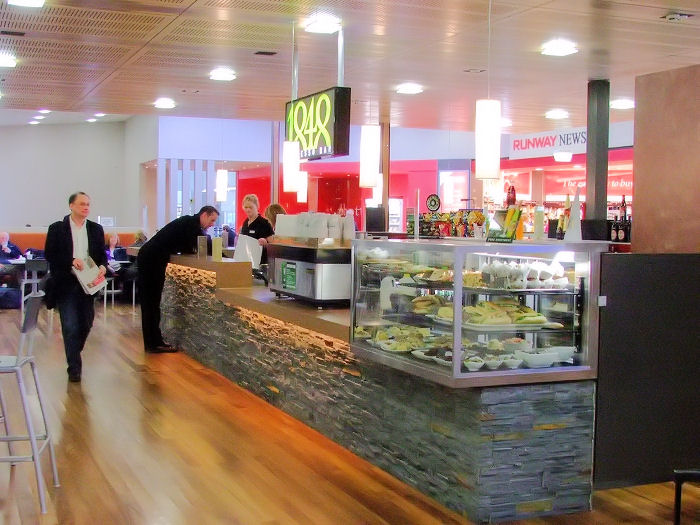
Terminal cafe

There are two domestic freight areas operating at the airport, catering for Qantas, Toll Air and Virgin Australia. The facility includes two buildings on a total area of approximately 10,000 m^{2} (110,000 sq ft), including the freight apron area. Qantas uses dedicated jet freight aircraft. In January 2007, Virgin Blue and Toll Air opened a 1,000 m^{2} (10,764 sq ft) dedicated freight facility to the north of the international terminal. This new freight area has no dedicated apron of its own, but rather makes use of the cargo holds of the passenger aircraft already serving the airport.

=== General aviation ===
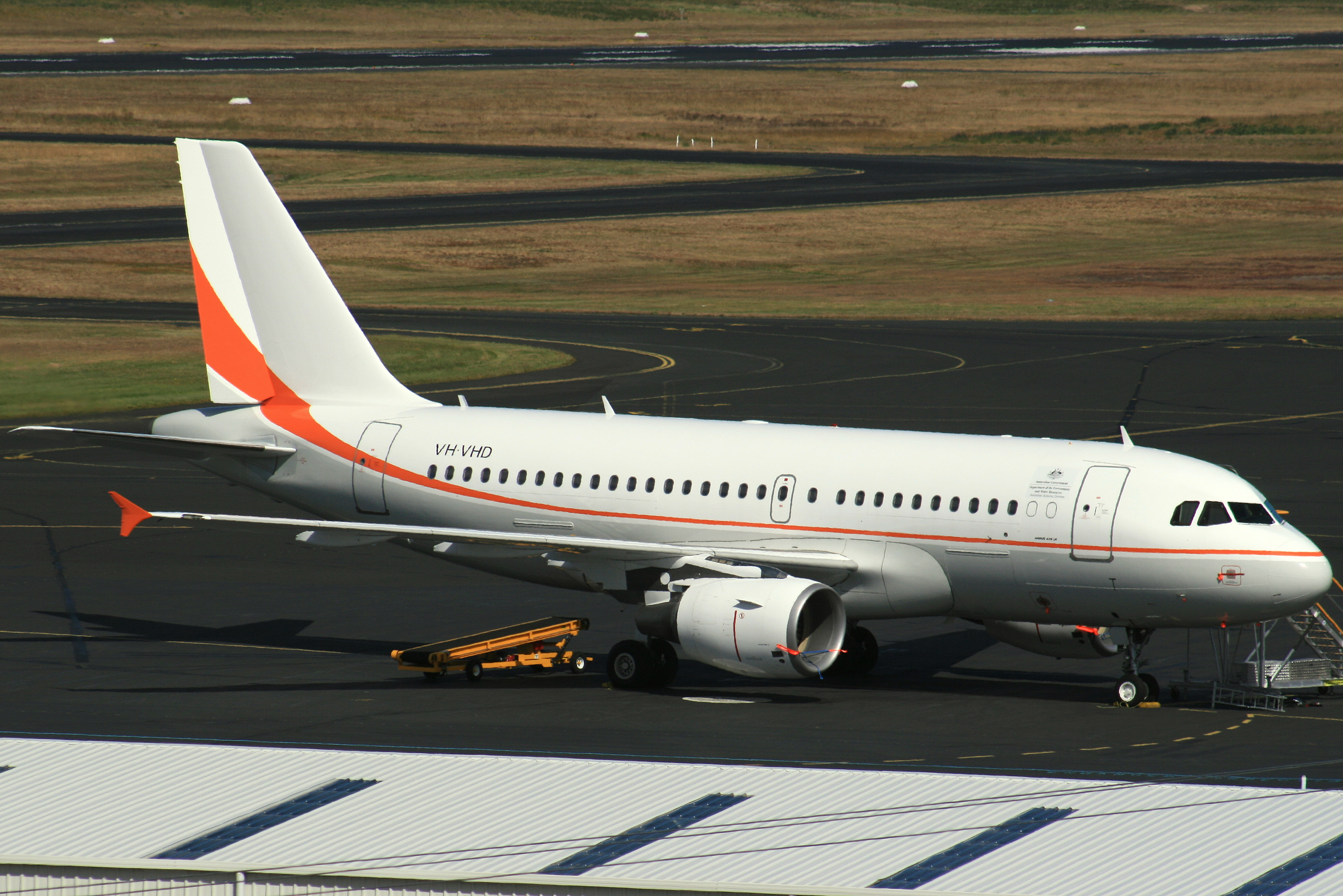
Skytraders Airbus A319LR at Hobart

The majority of Hobart's general aviation traffic makes use of the nearby Cambridge Aerodrome, which was sold in 1992 on the condition that it remain an airport until 2004. Since that date, Hobart Airport has made plans for a large expansion catering for general aviation should the owners of Cambridge Aerodrome decide to use the land for other purposes. This expansion would include a new runway and a general aviation apron located south of the existing Domestic Terminal.

== Runway ==
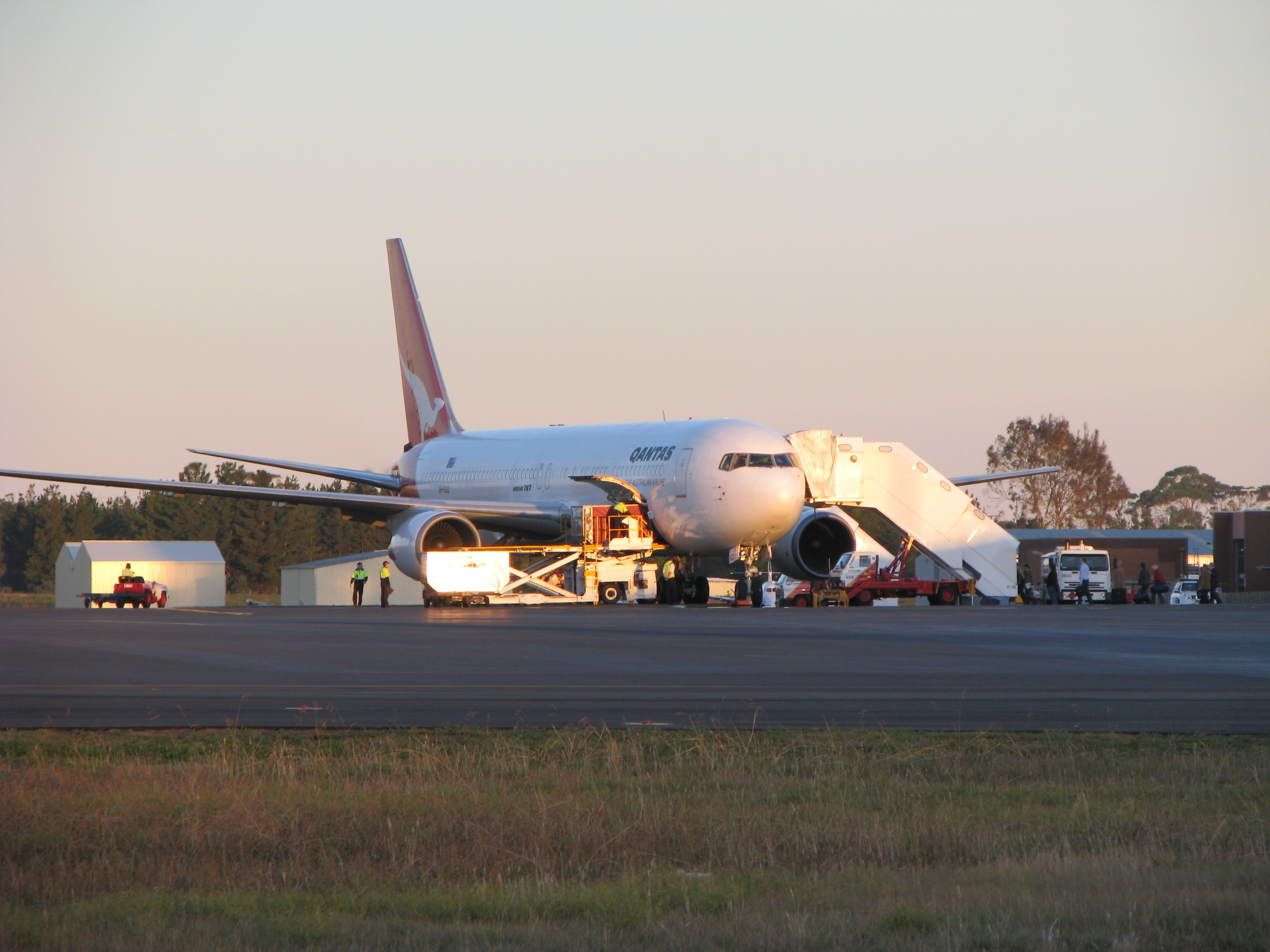
Qantas Boeing 767-300 at Hobart Airport

Hobart Airport has one runway, 12/30, which is aligned north–west to south–east and is 2,727 by 45 m (8,947 by 148 ft). The runway was extended in 2017 by 500 metres comprising a 350-metre extension at the southern end, a 150-metre lengthening to the northern end, and the relocation of the approach lights. The high strength flexible runway is constructed with an asphaltic concrete surface and is suitable for all Code E aircraft operations up to and including Boeing 777/747 aircraft. The current runway length is adequate for unrestricted operations on a Boeing 787-9 to China and Japan. The runway conforms to the Civil Aviation Safety Authority's standards.

In 2009, Hobart International Airport Pty Ltd announced detailed plans for the airport with a new 20-year master plan. Currently aircraft have to taxi along the runway and proceed to the parking apron via taxiways in the middle of the runway. This has both capacity and safety implications for the airport, as the runway cannot be used whilst an aircraft is taxiing. The plans provide for a parallel taxiway to the full length of runway. When complete, aircraft landing on the runway would proceed to the end of the runway and exit via the parallel taxiway. This would allow for greater utilisation of the existing runway.

The airport purchased land from the Tasmanian Government in the southern part of the airport for future development of operational facilities. This additional area would allow for a short runway for general aviation aircraft, either parallel to the main runway along the southern end of the eastern boundary of the airport, or a cross runway towards the southern end of the main runway. The alternative second runway would provide an opportunity to improve the operational management of the lighter categories of aircraft. However, the second runway is not likely to be developed any time soon, because the existing runway is under-utilised.

== Other facilities ==
=== Hotel ===
In December 2005, prominent Hobart developer Ali Sultan proposed a four star, 60-room hotel/motel for the airport. The hotel, named the Quality Hotel Hobart Airport, was opened on 1 December 2008. The hotel comprises 78 rooms, a restaurant/café and a number of conference and meeting spaces.

=== Big box development ===
Early in 2006, the airport announced plans to build a Direct Factory Outlet, covering an area of 18,000 m^{2} (190,000 sq ft), which would have made it the largest of its kind in Australia. Austexx, a Melbourne-based company, was the main investor in the $100 million project.

While the Tasmanian Government supported the project, believing the Direct Factory Outlet would drive retail trade growth, the Hobart City Council and a large amount of retail shop owners in the Hobart central business district expressed fears of losing business. Concern was also expressed about the big box being built on commonwealth land and therefore escaping the state planning laws. In 2008, plans for the project were submitted to the Federal Government for assessment. Federal Transport Minister Warren Truss gave approval on condition the outlet centre was cut by almost half to 10,000 m^{2} (110,000 sq ft), prompting Austexx to walk away from the proposal. In February 2008, Austexx' chief executive Geoff Porz confirmed the Direct Factory Outlet and Homemaker Hub project was back on. However, Austexx went into receivership in 2010.

=== Cold storage and warehousing ===
In December 2018 Link Logistics International started a cold storage and warehousing facility at the Hobart Airport. The facility was expanded during 2025. The cool rooms have a height of eight metres, which is ideal for block stacking pallets. Since opening the cold storage, Link Logistics International Pty Ltd has provided temperature-controlled storage solutions for customers wanting short-term seasonal storage to long-term storage. Storage has been provided to the industry from various sectors, including seafood, viticulture, stone fruit, berries, vegetable processors, craft beer, poultry, wine, ice cream, and restaurateurs wanting a larger storage alternative.

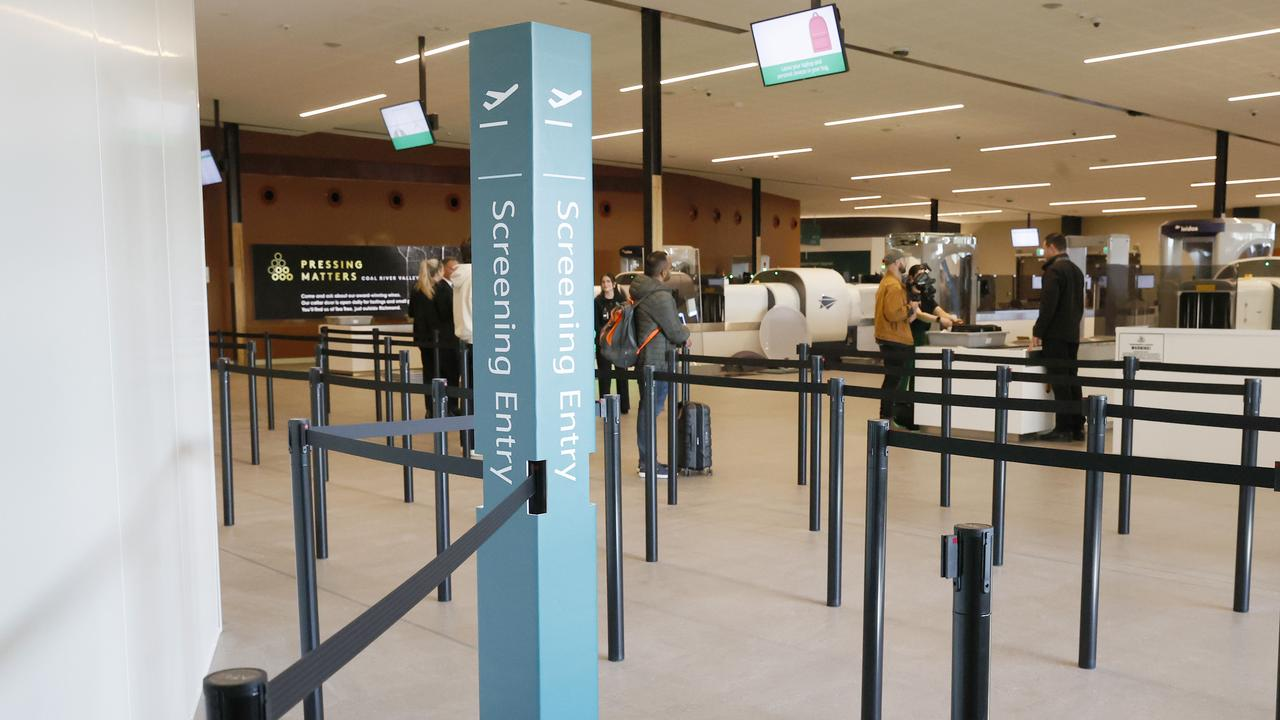
HBA new screening

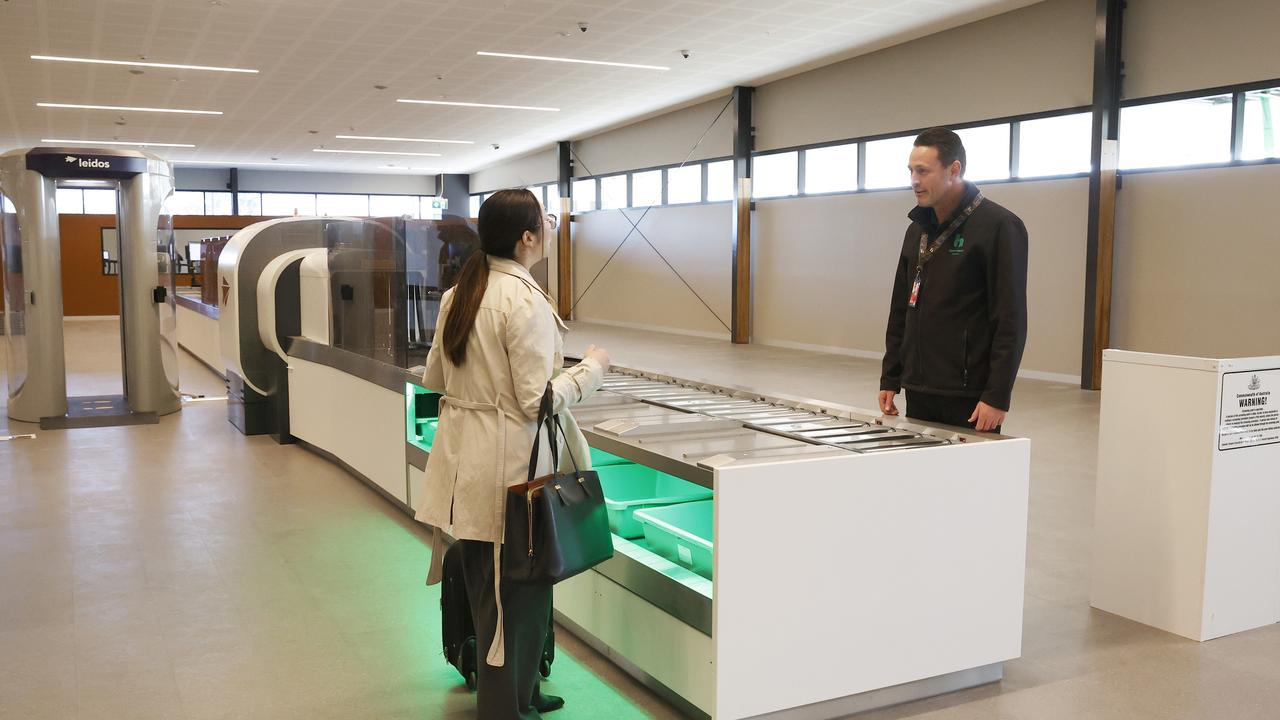
HBA new screening (2025)

== Airlines and destinations ==
=== Passenger ===
Airlines	Destinations
Air New Zealand	Seasonal: Auckland
Jetstar	Adelaide, Brisbane, Gold Coast, Melbourne, Sydney–Kingsford Smith; Seasonal: Newcastle
Link Airways	Canberra
Qantas	Brisbane, Melbourne, Sydney–Kingsford Smith
QantasLink	Seasonal: Canberra, Perth
Virgin Australia	Brisbane, Melbourne, Perth, Sydney–Kingsford Smith; Seasonal: Adelaide

Qantas formerly operated dedicated 'flightseeing' services over Antarctica from Hobart. These flights, which used a Boeing 787 Dreamliner, departed Hobart from the international/domestic terminal, and provided a guided aerial tour of Antarctica before returning to Australia. These flights were about thirteen hours in total.

Prior to April 2023, Sharp Airlines flew from Hobart to Launceston, Burnie, King Island and Flinders Island.

=== Cargo ===
Airlines	Destinations
Cathay Cargo	Seasonal: Hong Kong
Qantas Freight	Launceston, Melbourne
Skytraders	Seasonal: Wilkins Aerodrome

==== Private charter ====
Airlines	Destinations
Skytraders	Seasonal: Wilkins Aerodrome

== Traffic and statistics ==
Busiest domestic routes (year ending December 2024)
Rank	Airport	Passengers	% change
1	Melbourne	1,373,100	▲6.1%
2	Sydney	804,800	▲9.5%
3	Brisbane	307,000	▲4.5%

Annual passenger statistics for Hobart Airport
Year	Domestic	International	Total	Change
1998	855,934	2,690	858,624	▲2.7%
1999	877,992	-	877,992	▲2.3%
2000	927,957	-	927,957	▲5.7%
2001	996,179	-	996,179	▲7.4%
2002	947,682	-	947,682	▼ -4.9%
2003	1,101,555	-	1,101,555	▲16.2%
2004	1,380,849	-	1,380,849	▲25.4%
2005	1,600,185	-	1,600,185	▲15.9%
2006	1,617,810	-	1,617,810	▲1.1%
2007	1,663,596	-	1,663,596	▲2.8%
2008	1,830,870	-	1,830,870	▲10.1%
2009	1,874,459	-	1,874,459	▲2.4%
2010	1,882,092	-	1,882,092	▲0.4%
2011	1,844,681	-	1,844,681	▼ -2.0%
2012	1,919,026	-	1,919,026	▲4.0%
2013	2,091,706	-	2,091,706	▲9.0%
2014	2,127,981	-	2,127,981	▲1.7%
2015	2,238,432	-	2,238,432	▲5.2%
2016	2,378,137	-	2,378,137	▲6.2%
2017	2,510,343	-	2,510,343	▲5.6%
2018	2,676,628	-	2,676,628	▲6.6%
2019	2,781,739	-	2,781,739	▲3.9%
2020	879,663	-	879,663	▼ -68.4%
2021	1,261,289	4,480	1,265,769	▲43.9%
2022	2,289,011	14,527	2,303,538	▲82.0%
2023	2,579,514	31,915	2,611,429	▲13.0%
2024	2,729,286	20,292	2,749,578	▲5.3%
2025	2,865,387	19,580	2,884,967	▲4.9%

== Ground transport ==
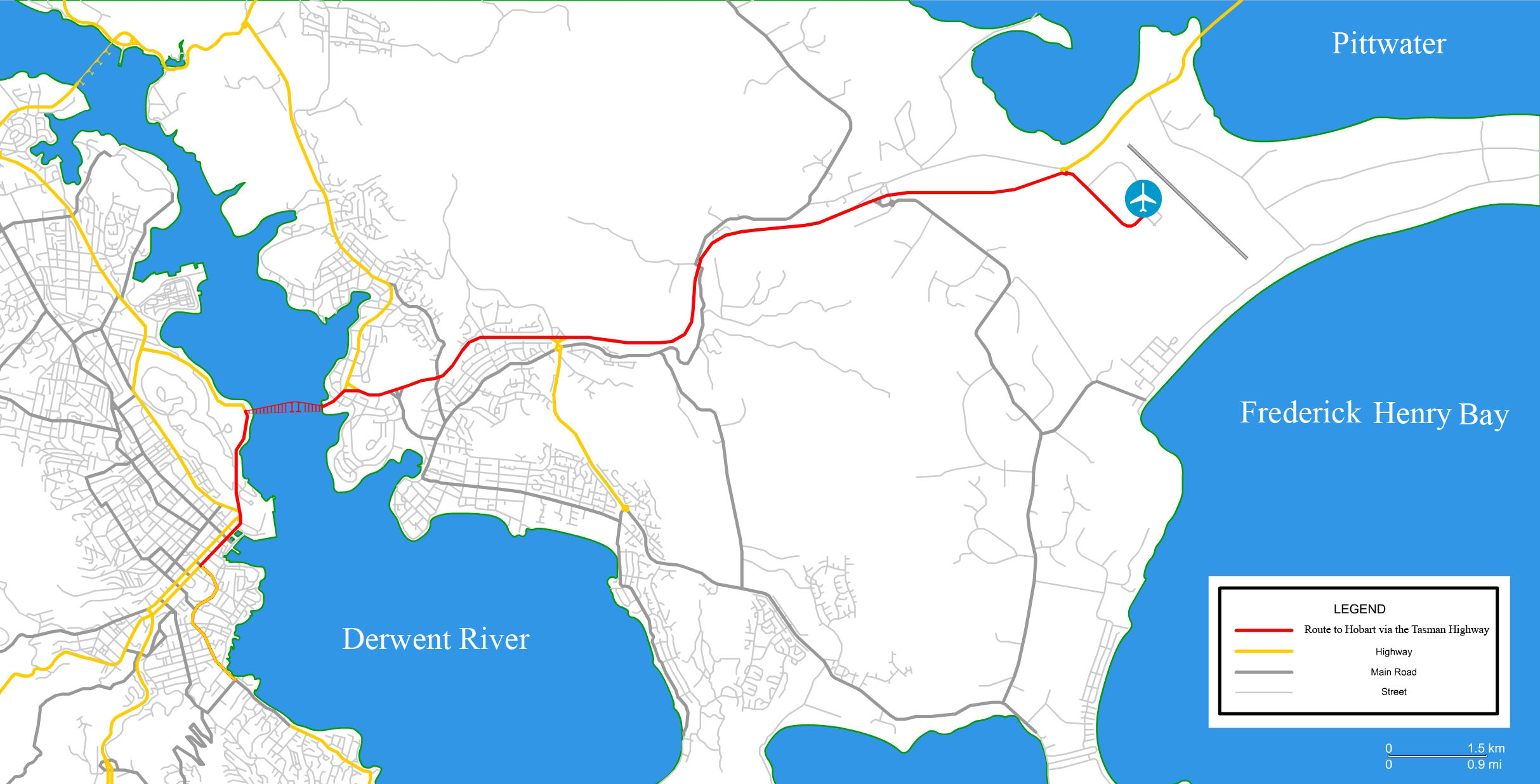
Hobart Airport in relation to Hobart

Public transport had not been a high use alternative to private transport for those travelling to and from the airport. A SkyBus service was launched in June 2018, which operates between the Hobart central business district and the airport. The shuttle departs outside the terminal every 30 minutes transferring passengers to the city.
