= 1993 Launceston Piper Chieftain crash =

Aviation accident in Tasmania

1993 Launceston Piper Chieftain Crash
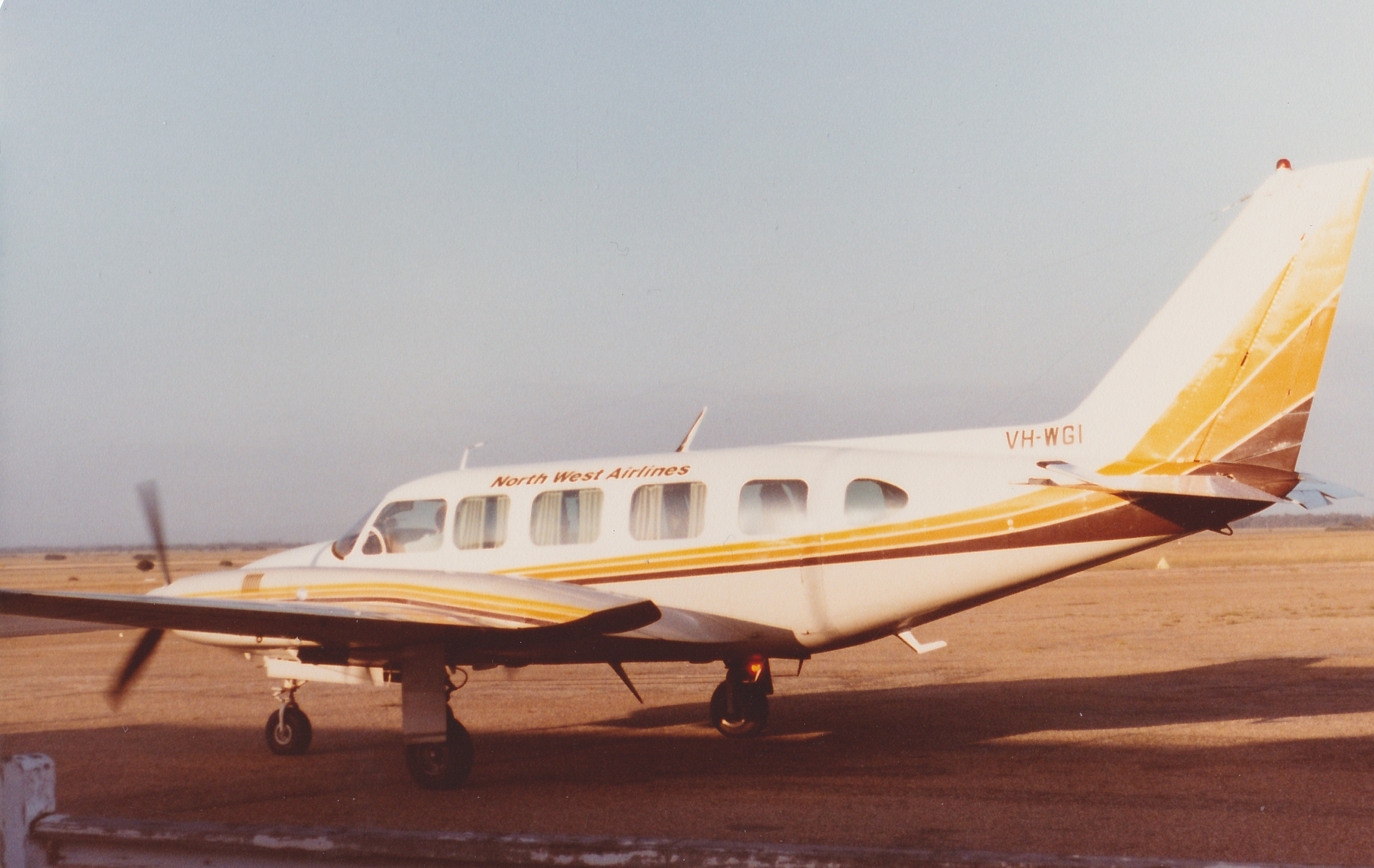
- VH-WGI, the aircraft involved in the crash, pictured in 1982

Accident
- Date: September 17, 1993
- Summary: Pilot error
- Site: Launceston Airport, Tasmania, Australia.; 41°32′42″S 147°12′54″E

Aircraft
- Aircraft type: Piper PA-31-350 Navajo Chieftain
- Operator: Hibiscus Aviation Service
- Registration: VH-WGI
- Flight origin: Moorabbin Airport, Melbourne, Australia
- Destination: Launceston Airport, Tasmania, Australia
- Occupants: 10
- Passengers: 9
- Crew: 1
- Fatalities: 6
- Survivors: 4

On 17 September 1993, a Piper PA-31-350 Navajo Chieftain light twin-engine aircraft (registration VH-WGI) crashed during a night approach to Launceston Airport in Tasmania, Australia. The aircraft was carrying a group of nine passengers (members of a Victorian football club) and one pilot on a private cost-sharing flight from Moorabbin, Victoria. While attempting a low-altitude circling approach in marginal weather, the pilot lost control and the plane struck terrain about 2 kilometres from the runway. The crash and ensuing fire killed six passengers and seriously injured the pilot and three other occupants. The Bureau of Air Safety Investigation (BASI) determined that the accident resulted primarily from pilot error and poor decision-making, exacerbated by the pilot's inexperience, minimal training on the aircraft, and distractions from unruly passengers.

== Background ==
The flight was organized as an end-of-season trip for the Lyndale Football Club in Melbourne's south-east. A total of 26 club members chartered three light aircraft for the journey to Launceston. The accident aircraft, a 10-seat Piper PA-31-350 Chieftain, was operated by Hibiscus Aviation Services and flown under a cost-sharing private arrangement (with passengers contributing to aircraft hire costs). Roger Rodrigues, a 23-year-old commercial pilot, was the pilot in command. Rodrigues was employed as a flying instructor by the operator and had only just completed his PA-31 Chieftain type endorsement training on 16 September 1993, the day before the flight. He held a multi-engine instrument rating issued in May 1993 and had about 701 hours total flying experience, but only around 1.5 hours on the Chieftain type at the start of the trip.

The passengers aboard VH-WGI were six players and three supporters from the Lyndale club, many of whom had been consuming alcohol during the day's travel and were travelling to meet up with other teammates who had taken an earlier flight. According to investigators, some passengers were intoxicated upon boarding and continued to drink in flight, which would later prove to be a factor in the accident. Two other aircraft carrying the remainder of the group departed Moorabbin around the same time: a smaller Piper PA-23 Aztec (VH-PAC) flying under visual flight rules, and another Piper Navajo (VH-NOS) under instrument flight rules. All three planes were rented from the same flying school and loaded that afternoon under the supervision of the company's chief pilot (CP). Investigators later noted that the CP helped load the passengers and both him and the pilot knew the Chieftain was above its maximum take-off weight with ten people and full fuel, yet they allowed it to depart regardless. Australian regulations at the time limited private cost-sharing flights to six persons on board, a rule the operator was unaware of and inadvertently violated by dispatching ten people on VH-WGI.

== Flight details ==
VH-WGI departed Moorabbin Airport at 6:17 pm (EST) on 17 September 1993 for the roughly 90-minute flight to Launceston. The pilot filed an IFR (instrument flight rules) flight plan, as did the other Navajo, while the smaller PA-23 flew VFR. Weather forecasts for Launceston earlier that day had predicted generally good conditions—only 2–3 oktas of stratocumulus cloud at 2,000–3,500 feet, with no alternate airport required. However, en route to Tasmania the weather deteriorated more than expected. As VH-WGI approached northern Tasmania, reports indicated increasing cloud cover and lowering ceilings around Launceston.

During the cruise, the pilot missed a required position report over Wonthaggi and deviated off course slightly, later explaining that he had experienced a radio problem. Communication with Melbourne Air Traffic Control was re-established after about 15 minutes, and the flight continued uneventfully at 9,000 feet toward Launceston. At 7:27 pm the pilot contacted Launceston Tower and was cleared for a DME arrival along the inbound radial for runway 32. By this time, conditions at Launceston had worsened: the tower's weather update noted broken cloud (4 oktas) at only 800 ft AGL. The controller advised Rodrigues that if he did not become visual by the missed-approach point, he would need to conduct an ILS approach via the Nile NDB. The pilot acknowledged and continued the approach, hoping for a break in the clouds.

As VH-WGI neared the airport, Launceston Tower made an all-stations broadcast warning inbound aircraft of the deteriorating weather and instructing them to expect an ILS approach. At 7:40:56 pm, Rodrigues reported he was overhead the airfield but did not have it in sight and was initiating a go-around. Moments later, he reported he had the airfield in sight after all. The controller informed him that he was cleared for a visual approach to runway 32, or he could still execute the published missed approach as preferred. Rodrigues elected to proceed visually and was instructed to “manoeuvre as preferred” for runway 32. This decision set the stage for the ill-fated circling circuit.

== Accident ==
Rodrigues began a visual circling approach to align with runway 32, descending below the cloud base. Witnesses on the ground saw VH-WGI emerge from low clouds south-east of the airport, then turn left to fly a close, low circuit pattern. The aircraft remained at an estimated 500–800 feet altitude as it circled, occasionally disappearing into patches of cloud in the dark night. Observers noted the aircraft appeared to be flying at high speed and with a high power setting. The pilot kept the downwind leg very tight to the runway to avoid losing visual reference. As the Piper turned from downwind to base, its altitude was only about 300–500 feet and it briefly flew through another cloud bank.

Late on the left base leg, at approximately 19:43, the aircraft entered a steep left bank (estimated around 60°). Almost immediately afterward, VH-WGI descended rapidly in a nose-down attitude and struck a power line with its right wing about 28 feet above the ground, causing an airport electrical blackout at 19:43:02. The Chieftain then clipped low bushes and crashed into a field short of the runway, coming to rest near Evandale Road. The impact sequence was severe but potentially survivable; however, a fierce post-crash fire engulfed the cabin.

Of the ten people on board, six passengers were killed (all members of the football club). The pilot and three passengers survived with serious injuries. None of the occupants suffered fatal trauma on impact; fatalities resulted from the fire and inability to escape the burning wreckage. Local residents and motorists helped rescue the survivors. Emergency services arrived quickly, but the fire had consumed most of the airframe. The accident remains one of the worst civil aviation disasters in Tasmania's history.

== Investigation ==
The Bureau of Air Safety Investigation conducted a detailed investigation. The findings revealed a chain of errors and contributing factors centered on the pilot's actions and decisions, with additional organizational and regulatory shortcomings.

=== Pilot’s decision-making errors ===
Investigators concluded that the pilot's critical mistake was choosing to continue with a visual circling approach at night in marginal weather. A safer course of action would have been to commit to the missed approach and fly an ILS precision approach.

=== Improper circling manoeuvre ===
Rodrigues flew a very tight, descending circuit that exceeded his training. The Chieftain's approach was fast and high power, and he used large bank angles to turn, increasing workload and risk.

=== Loss of control on base leg ===
BASI analysis determined that as the aircraft turned base at roughly 200 ft AGL, Rodrigues may have been distracted, possibly while lowering the landing gear. The aircraft did not stall before impact but entered an uncontrolled descent.

=== Pilot inexperience and training deficiencies ===
Rodrigues's low experience and minimal training were pivotal. At 23 years old, he had only a few hours on type and limited instrument experience. His PA-31 endorsement training included only daytime flying and no night or instrument practice. He was also not instrument-current by regulation.

=== Distractions and passenger pressure ===
Several passengers were intoxicated, noisy, and disruptive. BASI concluded that the cabin commotion and self-imposed time pressure influenced the pilot's decision to attempt a quick visual landing.

=== Procedural and organizational factors ===
Investigators identified confusion about circling-approach rules and inadequate operator oversight. The chief pilot failed to ensure Rodrigues's competence and allowed an overweight, over-capacity flight to depart. BASI further criticized the Civil Aviation Authority's minimal endorsement standards at the time.

== Aftermath ==
A coronial inquest in Tasmania, led by Coroner Peter Wilson in 1995, found that the inexperience of pilot Roger Rodrigues contributed to the crash and that better oversight might have prevented it. The coroner commended first responders and made recommendations to improve flight-safety training standards.

No criminal charges were laid against the pilot or the operator. However, the Civil Aviation Authority clarified rules on private cost-sharing and strengthened multi-engine training requirements. BASI's recommendations prompted reforms emphasizing night and instrument proficiency, as well as decision-making and crew-resource management in training syllabi.

Emergency-response systems at Launceston Airport were also upgraded following the investigation.

The 1993 Launceston Piper Chieftain crash remains a case study in pilot decision-making, training adequacy, and operational oversight, with long-term effects on Australian aviation safety culture.
