= No. 7 Elementary Flying Training School RAAF =

Coordinates: 41°32′42″S 147°12′54″E

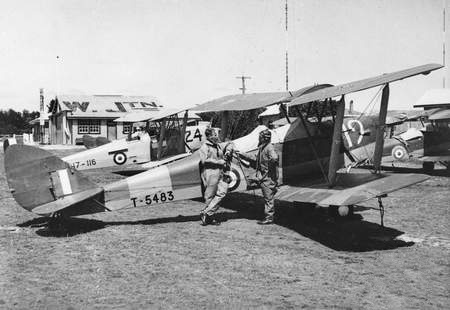
- Two airmen assigned to No. 7 Elementary Flying School with two of the unit's Tiger Moth aircraft at Western Junction Aerodrome
- Active: 1940–1945
- Country: Australia
- Branch: Royal Australian Air Force
- Role: Introductory flying training
- Engagements: World War II

Aircraft flown
- Trainer: Tiger Moth

No. 7 Elementary Flying Training School was a Royal Australian Air Force (RAAF) pilot training unit that operated during World War II. It was established in August 1940 at Western Junction Aerodrome, Tasmania, and provided introductory flying training to new RAAF pilots. Training activities ceased in December 1944, and the unit was disbanded in August the next year.

== History ==
As part of Australia's commitment to the Empire Air Training Scheme, the RAAF established twelve elementary flying training schools in 1940 and 1941. The role of these units was to provide a twelve-week introductory flying course to personnel who had graduated from one of the RAAF's initial training schools. Flying training was undertaken in two stages; the first involved four weeks of instruction (including ten hours of flying), which were used to determine trainees' suitability to become pilots. Those that passed this grading process then received a further eight weeks of training (including 65 hours of flying) at the elementary training school. Pilots who successfully completed this course were posted to a service flying training school in either Australia or Canada for the next stage of their instruction as military aviators.

No. 7 Elementary Flying Training School (No. 7 EFTS) was established at Western Junction Aerodrome (the modern Launceston Airport) on 29 August 1940. This aerodrome pre-dated the war, and had been used by the Tasmanian Aero Club. To make way for the flying school the club moved its aircraft and other equipment to Cambridge Aerodrome near Hobart. While the flying club expected to be incorporated into the RAAF's training effort, this did not eventuate. As a result, No. 7 EFTS was the only RAAF aircrew training unit to be located in Tasmania during the war.

The flying school's initial complement arrived throughout in August, and were billeted at nearby Launceston, until work to construct facilities at Western Junction was completed. A satellite airfield was also eventually built at Nile, 7.5 miles (12.1 km) from Western Junction Aerodrome. No. 7 EFTS's first eleven Tiger Moth trainers arrived on 11 September 1940, and flight training began nine days later. The unit was initially organised as a half-strength elementary flying school, and comprised two flights. The flights operated 18 Tiger Moths, and several others were held in reserve.

On 31 May 1941 two No. 7 EFTS Tiger Moths collided as they were taking off. The pilot of one of the two aircraft was killed, and his passenger was injured. Several other more minor accidents also took place. By the end of October 1944, No. 7 EFTS was equipped with approximately 60 Tiger Moths, and had trained 1801 pilots. While No. 7 EFTS was the only flying unit stationed at Western Junction, the aerodrome was often visited by Airspeed Oxfords piloted by aircrew undergoing training at the Bairnsdale-based No. 1 Operational Training Unit. No. 67 Squadron aircraft also passed through the aerodrome during anti-submarine patrols of the Bass Strait area; this unit was headquartered at Laverton in Victoria.

No. 7 EFTS' efforts were reduced as the war came to an end. Training was suspended in December 1944, and all flying ceased on 28 March the next year. The school was disbanded on 31 August 1945. Many of the Tiger Moths previously used by No. 7 EFTS were sold after the war, and three hangars constructed for the RAAF at Western Junction were donated to the Tasmanian Aero Club.
