= King Island Airlines =

Australian airline

- Fleet size: 4
- Destinations: 2
- Headquarters: Moorabbin, Victoria, Australia
- Website: kingislandair.com.au

Matakana Nominees Pty. Ltd., trading as King Island Airlines, is a small charter airline based in Moorabbin, Australia.

== Destinations ==
- King Island Airport
- Moorabbin Airport

== Fleet ==
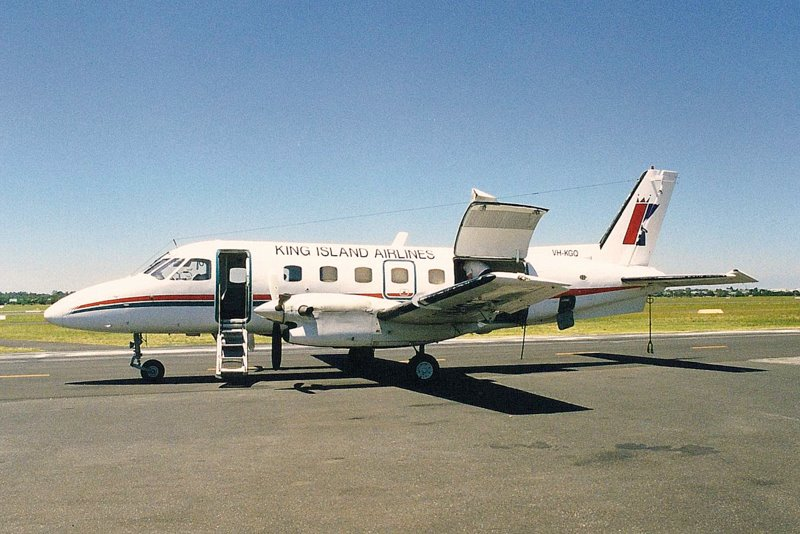
A King Island Airlines Embraer Bandeirante in the airline's old colour scheme at Moorabbin Airport in 1998

As of October 2026 the King Island Airlines fleet consists of:

- 4 Piper PA-31-350 Chieftain

== See also ==
- List of airlines of Australia
