= St Helens Airport =

- IATA: HLS; ICAO: YSTH

Summary
- Airport type: Public
- Operator: Break O'Day Council
- Location: St Helens, Tasmania
- Elevation AMSL: 158 ft / 48 m
- Coordinates: 41°20′12″S 148°16′54″E

Maps
- Location in Tasmania
- Interactive map of St Helens Airport

Runways
Direction	Length		Surface
Direction	m	ft	Surface
08/26	1,070	3,510	Gravel
- Sources: Australian AIP and aerodrome chart

St Helens Airport (IATA: HLS, ICAO: YSTH) is a small Australian regional airport located 2 nautical miles (3.7 km; 2.3 mi) east of St Helens on the north-east coast of Tasmania.

The airport is commonly used to transport fresh seafood from the east coast to the Australian mainland. The airport also has a small flying school and scenic flights also operate out of the airport. The airport has one unsealed runway and a NDB beacon on 392 kHz.

In 2014, the Royal Flying Doctor Service of Tasmania installed the state's first patient transfer shelter at St Helens Airport. These structures are strategically placed at remote airports around the state that are prone to inclement weather, offering protection to patients and paramedics awaiting aeromedical evaluation flights.

== See also ==
- List of airports in Tasmania
