= George Town Aerodrome =

George Town International Airport
- IATA: GEE; ICAO: YGTO

Summary
- Airport type: Public/Private
- Operator: George Town Airport Association
- Location: George Town, Tasmania, Australia
- Elevation AMSL: 120 ft (37 m)
- Coordinates: 41°04′48″S 146°50′24″E
- Website: georgetownairport.com.au

Maps
- Location in Tasmania
- Interactive map of George Town International Airport

Runways
Direction	Length		Surface
Direction	m	ft	Surface
06R/24L	800	2,625	Asphalt
10/28	545	1,788	Grass
13/31	380	1,247	Grass
06L/24R	500	1,640	Grass
- Sources: AIP

George Town Aerodrome (IATA: GEE, ICAO: YGTO), also known as George Town Airport, is a minor airport serving George Town, Tasmania, Australia which is operated by George Town Airport Association. The current facility opened in 1973, replacing an earlier rudimentary aerodrome nearby that was prone to flooding.

== History ==
=== Emergency landing ground ===
During 1935, the Civil Aviation Branch of the Department of Defence announced they were seeking a site to construct an aerodrome near George Town to serve as an emergency landing ground for passenger flights encountering fog and poor weather enroute between Tasmania and Melbourne. A site on crown land was eventually selected at Umbrella Flats, adjacent to Low Head. On 28 May 1937, a de Havilland Dragon Rapide, Memma of Australian National Airways became the first aircraft to land at the site after heavy rains and poor visibility meant the flight could not proceed to Western Junction, near Launceston.

An incident involving an Australian National Airways aircraft in occurred in June 1938. Douglas DC-3 Kurana encountered bad weather near Bell Bay and diverted to the aerodrome. The heavily loaded aircraft carried 21 passengers and three crew, including Senator Charles Grant. After landing on a waterlogged runway, Kurana attempted to turn around and taxi, but quickly sank into the mud and became bogged. Passengers were stuck on board for 3 hours while waiting for help, and then were forced to wade through 10 to 12 inch-deep water, except for the Senator, who was loaned gumboots by one of the drivers sent to collect the stranded group. Multiple attempts by horse teams from the Public Works Department and volunteers from the George Town community to recover the aircraft over the following days were unsuccessful. The incident prompted criticism of the value of government funds being used to maintain emergency landing grounds that were only usable in clear weather by members of the Federal opposition. Standing water remained at the eastern end of the aerodrome in September of that year, rendering it unusable and prompting demands that the government in Canberra fund immediate drainage works.

During the 1940s, a number of military exercises were staged at the airfield, including the first combined-arms Army exercise in Tasmania after World War II in 1948. In May 1946, the body of a missing 2 year old boy, Michael Allen Newman was found next to the aerodrome gate. It is believed the child walked 7 miles from his family's campsite near George Town before succumbing to exposure.

In 1954, the federal government announced plans to sell the aerodrome site, as without a regular passenger or freight service, the ongoing maintenance was not viable. This decision was criticised by the George Town Council, who argued that the developing aluminium industry in the area would soon require the airport. The Premier of Tasmania, Sir Robert Cosgrove expressed opposition to the disposal, arguing that the aluminium industry would probably bring opportunities for aircraft manufacturing at the airport.

=== New airport ===
The George Town Airport Association formed in 1968, aiming to construct a new aerodrome. The site selected was a short distance to the south of the original Umbrella Flat landing ground.

With the support of the George Town Chamber of Commerce and Tasmanian Aero Club, the George Town Airport Association constructed and managed a new 750 m × 100 m (2,460 ft × 330 ft) grass airstrip that was opened in April 1973 by Tasmania's Minister for Transport Neil Batt. The main runway was sealed and extended in the 1990s to allow passenger charters and aeromedical flights to operate safely using a funding grant that was contingent on the council assuming ownership of the site.

The main runway was re-sealed in 2018. By 2019, there were 19 hangars and over 30 aircraft based at the airport. The George Town Council decision to sell the airport the same year was met with opposition by the George Town Airport Association and the Australian branch of the Aircraft Owners and Pilots Association. These groups raised particular concerns that an expression of interest by a Chinese company was under consideration, threatening the airport's ongoing future as a community facility.

In August 2021, the George Town Council developed a master plan to guide the future development of the airport.

== Facilities and operations ==
The airfield caters mostly to private and recreational aviation uses, however there are some limited commercial flight training and skydiving operations based at George Town. It is occasionally used by medical and fire-fighting aircraft.

The airfield has four runways. The primary runway 06R/24L measures 800 m × 20 m (2,625 ft × 66 ft), is sealed and suitable for all weather operations. Runway lighting was previously installed, but removed after 2018 to reduce costs in line with the council's strategic plan to maintain the airport as a hub for recreational aviation. The three smaller grass strips are prone to soggy conditions in wet weather. The airfield is open to visitors with prior permission, although no fuel is available. The volume of traffic at the airport is low. Pilots are required to communicate via a Common Traffic Advisory Frequency (CTAF) to safely co-ordinate arrivals and departures. As of 2021, the ownership model requires the council to maintain runway 06R/24L and the public terminal, while the George Town Airport Association and tenants maintain the grass strips.

== Accidents and Incidents ==
- On 2 August 2025, two people departed from George Town Airport in a Bristell light-sport aircraft, intending to cross Bass Strait and continue on to the Central West of New South Wales. The aircraft failed to arrive at its destination, triggering a search that lasted until 23 September. No communication was received from the aircraft during the flight, and despite a lengthy and extensive search, no trace was found of either the aircraft or its occupants.

== See also ==
- List of airports in Tasmania
- Official website
