= Sharp Airlines =

Australian regional airline

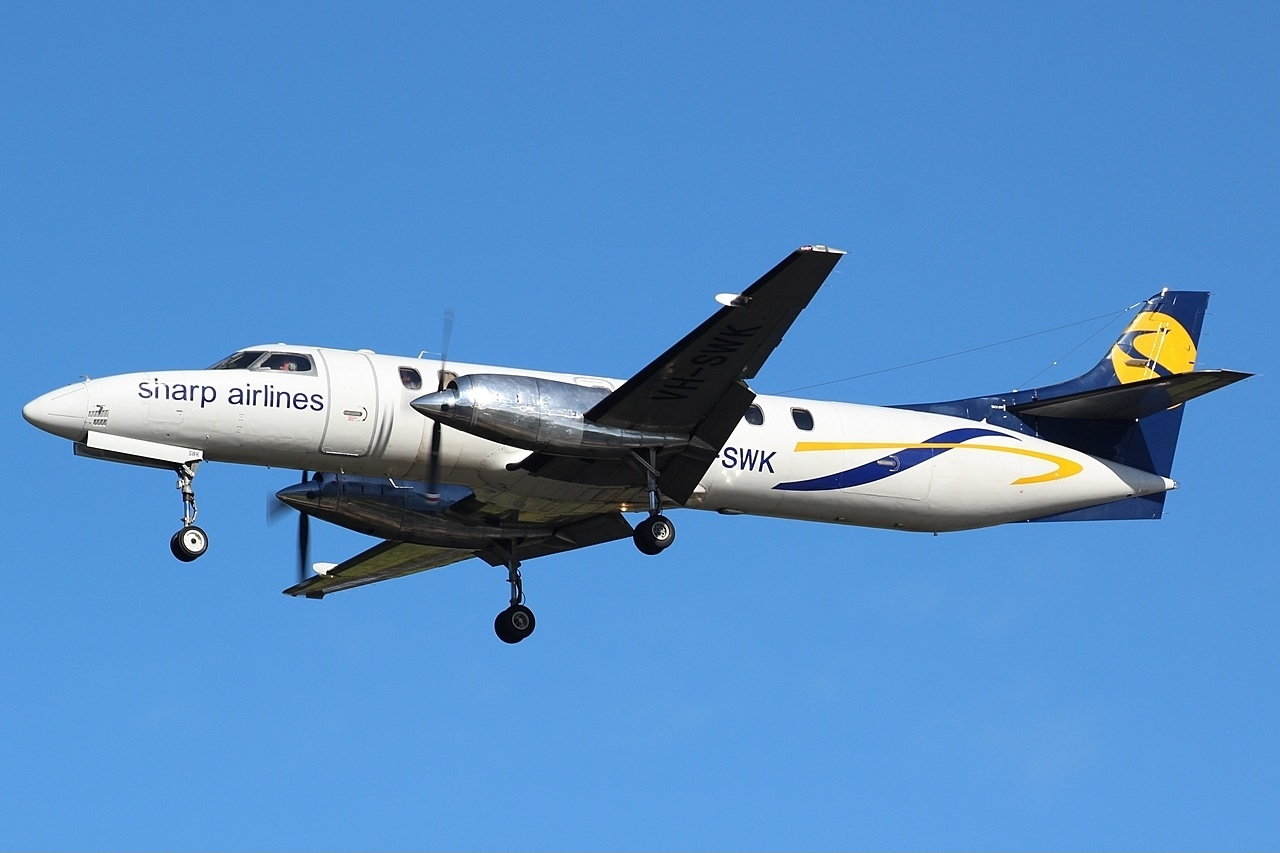
- A Sharp Airlines Fairchild Swearingen Metroliner
IATA	ICAO	Call sign
SH	—	SHARP
- Founded: 1990; 36 years ago
- Operating bases: Adelaide; Brisbane; Launceston; Melbourne–Essendon
- Fleet size: 17
- Destinations: 7
- Parent company: Sharp Aviation Pty. Ltd.
- Headquarters: Hamilton, Victoria, Australia
- Key people: Malcolm Sharp (Managing Director); Michael Korber (Director); Alistair Dorward (CEO)
- Website: www.sharpairlines.com.au

Sharp Airlines is a regional airline founded in Hamilton, Victoria, Australia in 1990. Sharp operates scheduled airline services in the southern states of Australia. Its main bases are Essendon Airport, Adelaide Airport, Launceston Airport and Brisbane Airport. The airline also provides charter operations to Tasmania, Victoria and South Australia . The parent company, Sharp Aviation, has its main maintenance base at Launceston Airport. Sharp Airlines has no registered ICAO code.

== History ==
Commencing operations using the Piper PA-31-350 Chieftain, the airline has continued to grow, acquiring Fairchild Metro aircraft to replace the Chieftains, and adding Essendon Airport to the route network. In April 2008, it commenced services to Port Augusta from a new Adelaide Airport base of operations. Services from Adelaide to Port Augusta were terminated in May 2017.

In October 2009, Sharp Airlines commenced a trial service connecting Adelaide with Portland and Avalon Airport. In January 2010, it became a permanent addition to the flight schedule but was subsequently terminated.

In October 2010, Sharp Airlines took over routes to Flinders Island from Launceston in Tasmania and Essendon Airport in Melbourne, Victoria from the previous operator, Airlines of Tasmania. In late 2011, twice-daily flights to King Island from Launceston via Wynyard started.

In May 2019, the airline announced that it would cease operating its Melbourne (Essendon Airport) - Warrnambool - Portland service after 30 June 2019, due to a lack of patronage.

On 30 September 2020, Sharp Airlines started three return services per week between Hobart and King Island and Hobart and Flinders Island, allowing Tasmanians to travel within the State's borders directly from their capital city. These services were suspended in April 2023.

== Destinations ==
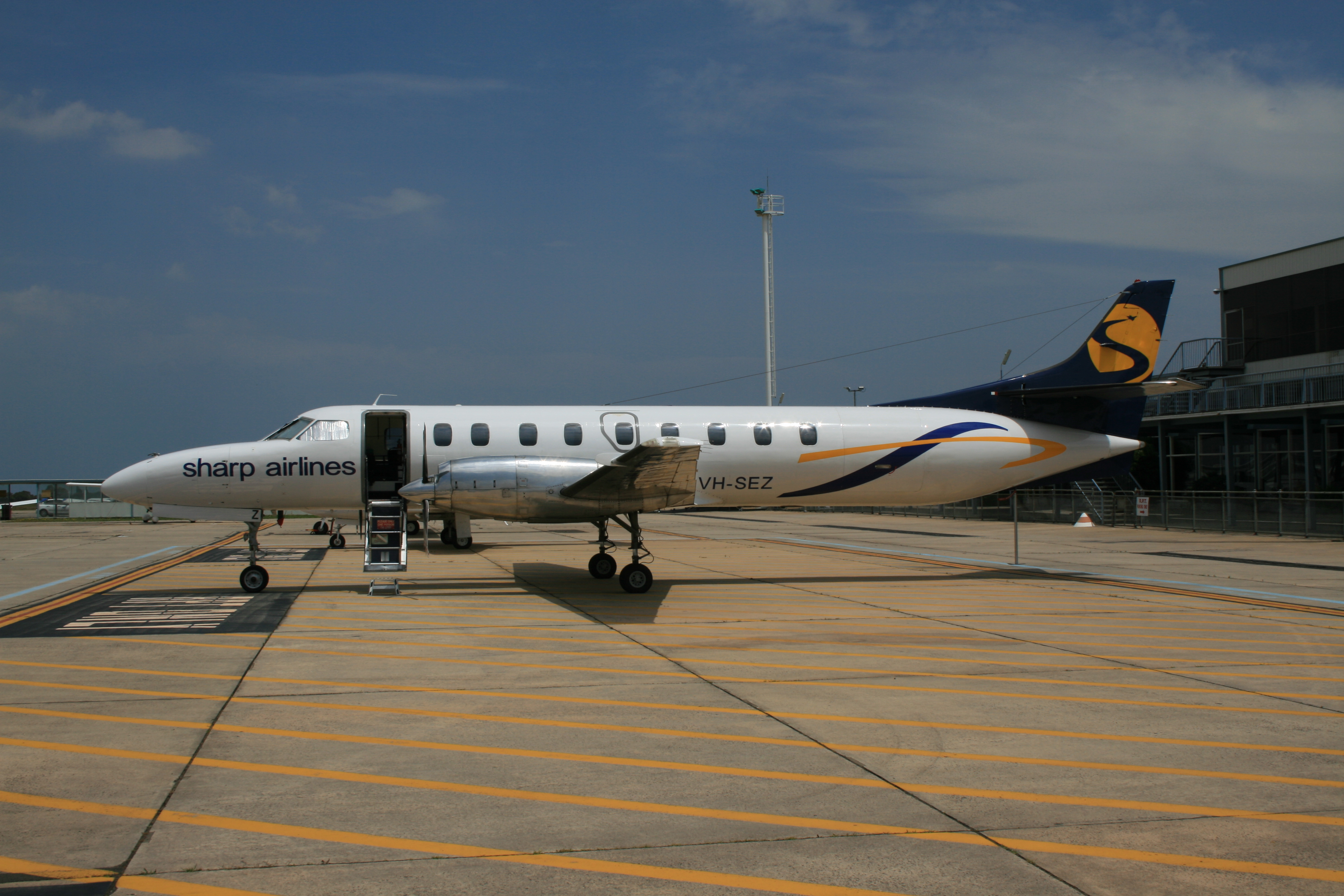
Sharp Airlines Fairchild Metro III at Essendon Airport

Sharp operates the following scheduled services.

- From Flinders Island, Tasmania (Flinders Island Airport)
  - Launceston, Tasmania (Launceston Airport)
  - Melbourne, Victoria (Essendon Airport)
- From King Island, Tasmania (King Island Airport)
  - Launceston, Tasmania (Launceston Airport)
  - Wynyard, Tasmania (Burnie Airport)
  - Melbourne, Victoria (Essendon Airport)

The airline also has a base at Adelaide Airport with 4-6 aircraft based there at any given time. Although there are no longer any regular passenger services out of Adelaide, the company operates frequent charters, mainly to mine sites throughout South Australia, some to Queensland and the Northern Territory. The scheduled services are operated using the airline's Metro III and Metro 23 aircraft. It also operates charter services using the Metros throughout Australia.

They also operate a designated freight service out of Brisbane Airport up the east coast of QLD on behalf of TGE (Team Global Express)

== Fleet ==
As of October 2024, Sharp Airlines operates the following aircraft:

Sharp Airlines fleet
Aircraft	In service	Orders	Passengers	Notes
Fairchild SA227-AC Metro III	5	—	19	RPT & Charter
Fairchild SA227-CC Metro 23	1	—	19	RPT & Charter
Fairchild SA227-DC Metro 23	12	—	19	RPT & Charter
Cargo fleet
Fairchild SA227-AC Metro III	3	—		
Fairchild SA227-DC Metro 23	2	—		
Total	23	—		

== See also ==
- List of airlines of Australia
