= King Island Airport =

- IATA: KNS; ICAO: YKII

Summary
- Airport type: Public
- Operator: King Island Council
- Serves: King Island
- Location: Currie, Tasmania
- Elevation AMSL: 132 ft (40 m)
- Coordinates: 39°52′39″S 143°52′42″E

Maps
- Location in Tasmania
- Interactive map of King Island Airport

Runways
Direction	Length		Surface
Direction	m	ft	Surface
06/24	800	2,625	Gravel
10/28	1,585	5,200	Asphalt
17/35	1,105	3,625	Composite material
- Sources: Australian AIP and aerodrome chart

King Island Airport (IATA: KNS, ICAO: YKII) is a small regional airport located near the town of Currie on King Island off the north-west coast of Tasmania, Australia. The airport is owned and operated by the King Island Council.

== History ==
An aerodrome site on King Island was selected in 1932. This was seen as a necessity by the community who previously had relied entirely on slow ships in the treacherous Bass Strait to access Tasmania and the mainland. The first flight landed on 24 December that year. The aerodrome was licensed for commercial operations in January 1933, allowing Holyman's Airways to begin scheduled passenger service. At a ceremony on 2 December 1933, the airport was officially opened by Sir Ernest Clark, the Governor of Tasmania. Holyman's were joined in September 1934 by Tasmanian Aerial Services, who stopped at King Island as part of the Melbourne to Hobart leg of the Empire Airmail Service linking Australia with the United Kingdom. By February 1935, flights operated three times per week each to Melbourne and Launceston.

== Airlines and destinations ==
=== Passenger ===
Airlines	Destinations
King Island Airlines	Melbourne–Moorabbin
Rex Airlines	Melbourne–Tullamarine
Sharp Airlines	Burnie, Melbourne—Essendon, Launceston

=== Cargo ===
Airlines	Destinations
Southern Airlines	Melbourne–Moorabbin

== Accidents and incidents ==
- On 21 October 1978, 20-year-old Frederick Valentich disappeared over Bass Strait in mysterious circumstances while flying solo between Melbourne and King Island. While over Bass Strait, prior to his disappearance, Valentich reported encountering a strange object in the sky that did not appear to be an aircraft. An extensive search by the Royal Australian Air Force found no trace of Valentich or his aircraft.
- The airport was the site of a light plane crash on 26 November 1998, when a Piper Lance crashed shortly after takeoff on its way to Moorabbin, Victoria, killing three Melbourne nurses on board. It was suspected that a strong gust of wind just after takeoff caused the plane to stall and crash.

== See also ==
- List of airports in Tasmania
