= CareSuper =

Australian industry super fund

- Type: mutual fund
- Industry: Superannuation
- Founded: 1986
- Headquarters: Melbourne, Australia
- Area served: Australia
- Key people: Linda Scott, Chair, Jason Murray, Chief Executive Officer, Suzanne Branton, Chief Investment Officer
- Total assets: A53 billion
- Website: www.caresuper.com.au

CareSuper is an Australian industry super fund.

It was established in 1986, as a retirement fund for people in professional, managerial, administration and service industries. It services over 500,000 members Australia-wide and has $53 billion in funds under management.

As a mutual fund, all profits earned by CareSuper's trustee is returned to members of the fund.

== History ==
Formerly the ‘Clerical, Administrative and Related Employees Superannuation Plan’, CareSuper was established in 1986 as one of the early industry superannuation funds in Australia to meet award super requirements. In the new year of 1987, companies were invited to participate in CareSuper, the first to join was Siemens Limited.

In 1999, CareSuper became a public offer fund, enabling non employer-sponsored individuals to join the CareSuper Personal Plan.

In July 2007, CareSuper introduced a Pension product, allowing members to stay with the fund as they move towards or commence retirement.

In 2011, retired Australian swimmer Giaan Rooney became the face of CareSuper. As CareSuper's brand ambassador, she regularly featured in CareSuper's television advertisements and events. Her ambassadorship concluded in 2024.

It was announced in September 2011 that the then $4.9 billion fund CareSuper and $1.6 billion fund Asset Super were in talks to conduct a merger of the two funds.

The merger was completed on 27 October 2012, with 4 Trustee Directors from Asset joining the existing 9 Trustee Directors on the Board of CareSuper.

It was announced in June 2023 that the fund would enter into a binding agreement to merge with Spirit Super. The merger was completed on 1 November 2024.

CareSuper announced in July 2025 that it had signed a successor fund transfer deed to merge with Meat Employees' Industry Superannuation Fund, with the merger scheduled for October 1, 2025.

== See also ==
- Retail super fund
- Superannuation in Australia
