= Moorabbin Airport =

Municipal airport serving Melbourne, Victoria, Australia

Moorabbin Harry Hawker Airport Melbourne–Moorabbin
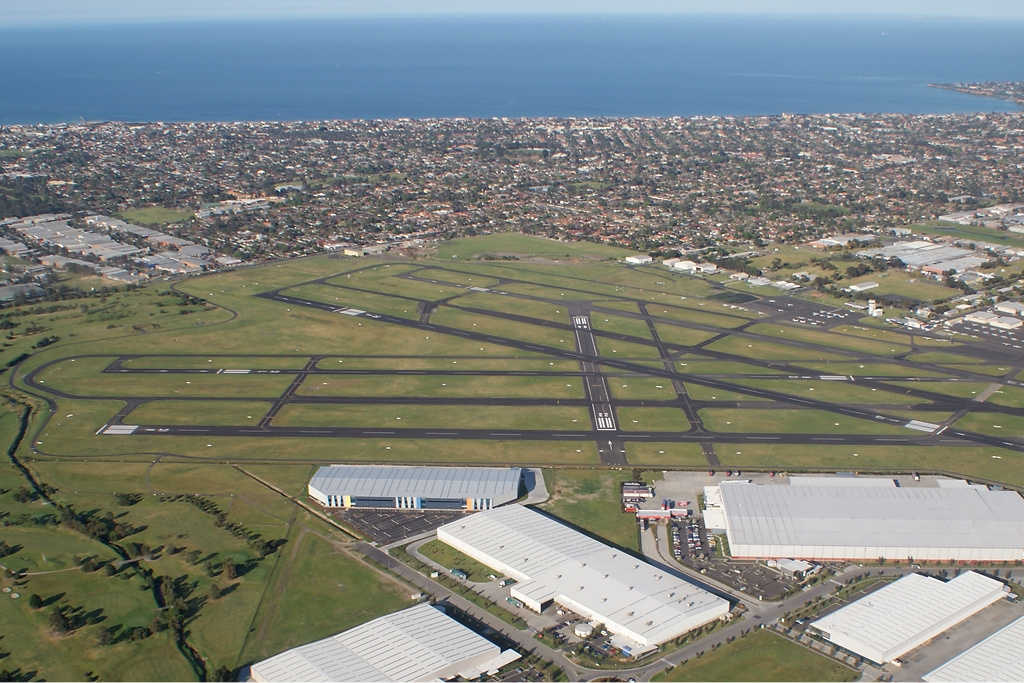
- Aerial photograph
- IATA: MBW; ICAO: YMMB; WMO: 94870

Summary
- Airport type: Public
- Owner: Barings
- Operator: Moorabbin Airport Corporation
- Serves: Melbourne
- Location: Moorabbin Airport, Victoria, Australia
- Opened: 15 December 1949; 76 years ago
- Elevation AMSL: 55 ft (17 m)
- Coordinates: 37°58′33″S 145°06′08″E
- Website: www.moorabbinairport.com.au

Map
- MBW YMMB (Victoria) YMMB (Australia)

Runways
Direction	Length		Surface
Direction	m	ft	Surface
04/22	571	1,873	Asphalt
13R/31L	1,060	3,478	Asphalt
13L/31R	1,149	3,770	Asphalt
17R/35L	1,240	4,068	Asphalt
17L/35R	1,335	4,380	Asphalt

Statistics (2010/11)
- Passengers: 9,766
- Aircraft movements: 274,082
- Sources: Australian AIP and aerodrome chart Passenger and aircraft movements from the Bureau of Infrastructure, Transport and Regional Economics (BITRE)

Moorabbin (Harry Hawker) Airport (IATA: MBW, ICAO: YMMB) is a general aviation airport for light aircraft located in between the southern Melbourne suburbs of Heatherton, Cheltenham, Dingley Village and Mentone. It also receives commercial airline service. The airport grounds are treated as their own suburb, and share the postcode 3194 with the neighbouring suburb of Mentone. With a total of 274,082 aircraft movements, Moorabbin Airport was the second busiest airport in Australia measured by aircraft movements for the calendar year of 2011.

== History ==
By 1946, Essendon Airport was Australia's busiest airport and Melbourne's only public airport, but was becoming congested even before expansion plans for Essendon were announced. Funding for the construction of a secondary airport was announced by Prime Minister Ben Chifley on 6 November 1946. The control tower opened on 15 December 1949 for training. Originally the intent was to name the airport "Mentone" but this was abandoned after a potential clash with the then French airport in Menton. Similarly, Cheltenham was discarded due to similarities to the Gloucestershire Airport near Cheltenham in South West England. The name comes from City of Moorabbin, the municipality in which it was then situated.

The control tower opened on 15 December 1949 and flying commenced on 31 December.

The airport was renamed to Moorabbin (Harry Hawker) Airport on 22 January 1989, after pioneering Australian aviator Harry George Hawker, on the centenary date of Hawker's birth.

== Accidents and incidents ==
- On 3 April 1953, an Avro Anson plane crash landed at the airport. The five-man crew escaped unharmed.
- On 19 October 1970, a Beech D50B light aircraft collided mid-air with a Bell 47G-3B-2 helicopter over the suburb of Moorabbin while on approach to Moorabbin airport. Both aircraft subsequently crashed to the ground and burst into flames. All 5 on board the two aircraft died in the crash.
- On 14 February 1995, a Hughes 300 helicopter crashed into Port Phillip Bay near Aspendale during a ferry flight from Geelong to Moorabbin airport for repairs. The tail boom failed in flight causing loss of control and subsequent crash into the shallow waters near the beach. The sole occupant, the pilot, died in the crash.
- On 18 March 2000, a Cessna 210E performed a ditching into a quarry in Heatherton, near Moorabbin Airport after experiencing a loss of performance. The aircraft had been performing an evaluation flight near the airport when it experienced difficulties. The pilot and both passengers evacuated the aircraft safely, however one passenger drowned before reaching land due to being unable to swim.
- On 29 July 2002, two Cessna 172Rs collided while on short final landing approach at Moorabbin airport following night circuit training. Both aircraft became entangled and crashed on the runway with subsequent fires. Both occupants from one aircraft evacuated safely, however the sole occupant of the other aircraft died in the crash.
- On 27 August 2008, a Cessna 150M was involved in a mid-air collision with a Piper PA-28 Cherokee near Moorabbin airport during training flights. Immediately upon the collision, the Cessna lost control and crashed into a garage in the suburb of Cheltenham bursting into flames and causing fatal injuries to the pilot, the sole occupant. The Piper was able to limp back to the airport where both occupants escaped injuries.
- On 7 August 2010, a Cessna 152 was involved in a serious incident after crashing into a backyard of a home in Mordialloc while on approach to nearby Moorabbin airport. The aircraft's engine failed as a result of fuel starvation. Both occupants escaped with only minor injuries and the aircraft was written off after sustaining major damage.
- On 11 August 2015, a Cessna 172 (VH-EUU) and a Piper PA-28 (VH-TXH) collided on the ground after TXH had a rough running engine and landed on Runway 22/04, After touchdown, the pilot of TXH decided they would not be able to stop on the runway and began to overshoot onto the grass and onto taxiway Alfa where EUU was taxiing. EUU was advised to stop by the Surface Movement Control (SMC) (Ground Control) but elected to continue to avoid a direct collision with TXH. TXH veered right in an attempt to avoid EUU; however, the left wing of TXH collided with the tail of EUU. The pilot of TXH was not injured. The pilot and passengers of EUU were treated for minor injuries. Both aircraft sustained substantial damage.
- On 8 June 2018, a pilot of a light plane, Cessna 172 (VH-EWE), died when his plane crashed and burst into flames in a street in Mordialloc, on short final for runway 35L. ATC recordings indicated he had an engine failure on approach, an ATSB report has been unable to find a cause behind this accident.
- On 30 November 2022, a Hughes 269C helicopter crashed into a residential structure in Mentone. The sole student pilot was seriously injured.

== Facilities ==
Moorabbin Airport, one of four in the city, serves the general aviation needs for the south-eastern suburbs of Melbourne. It has five intersecting runways, the longest being Runway 17L/35R with a length of 1,335 metres (4,380 ft). Usually, two parallel runways are used at the same time. The airport also has a control tower. The airport is home to the Royal Victorian Aero Club, the Australian National Aviation Museum and several flight training facilities, including a campus of multinational pilot training organisation CAE Oxford Aviation Academy.

== Airlines and destinations ==
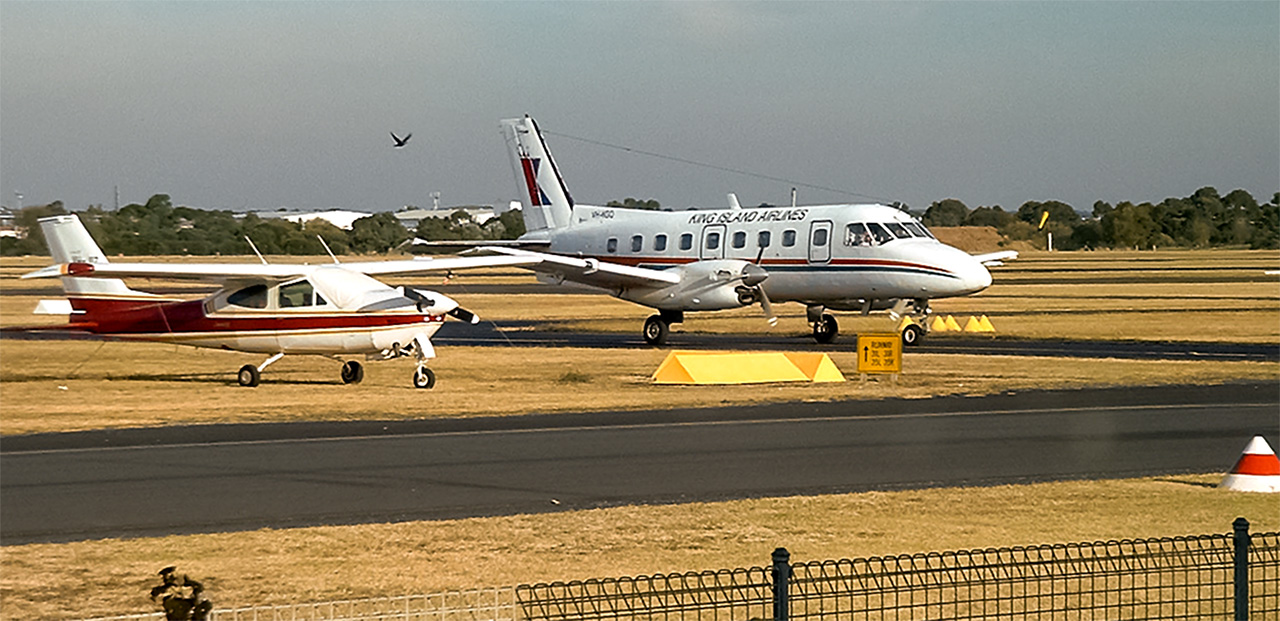
A King Island Airlines Embraer EMB 110 Bandeirante taxies past a parked Cessna 177RG Cardinal at Moorabbin

King Island Airlines flies between Moorabbin Airport and King Island Airport.

== Master plan ==
The master plan for Moorabbin Airport was approved by the federal Minister for Infrastructure Anthony Albanese, on 25 June 2010. The master plan provides a twenty-year horizon detailing the development of the airport and associated infrastructure.

A draft Major Development Plan for Moorabbin Airport drawn up by the Australian company Wesfarmers was refused by Albanese on 5 August 2013. The draft plan was for the development of large retail outlets on 4.8 hectares of airport land at the corner of Centre Dandenong Road and Boundary Road. The proposal had a floor area of 14,500m^{2}.

== See also ==
- List of airports in Victoria
- Transportation in Australia
