= Cambridge Aerodrome =

Airport serving Hobart, Tasmania, Australia

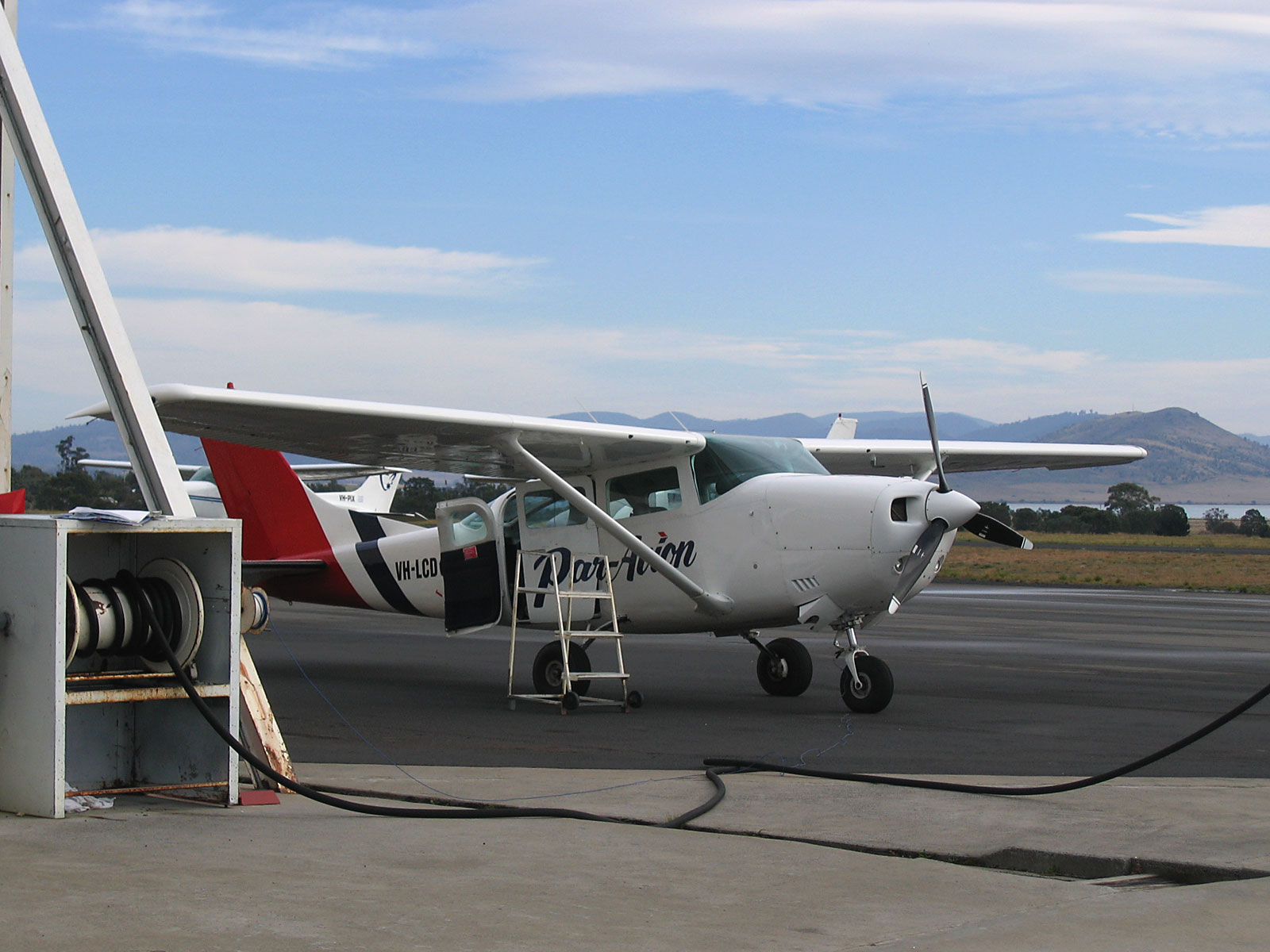
- IATA: none; ICAO: YCBG

Summary
- Airport type: Public
- Owner/Operator: Par Avion
- Serves: Hobart
- Location: Cambridge, Tasmania, Australia
- Opened: July 1934; 92 years ago
- Elevation AMSL: 67 ft (20 m)
- Coordinates: 42°49′35″S 147°28′36″E

Maps
- Location within Hobart Location within Tasmania
- Interactive map of Cambridge Aerodrome

Runways
Direction	Length		Surface
Direction	m	ft	Surface
09/27	1,116	3,661	Asphalt
12/30	1,200	3,937	Asphalt
- Sources: AIP

Cambridge Aerodrome (ICAO: YCBG), also known as Cambridge Airport, is a minor airport located in Cambridge, a suburb of Hobart, Tasmania, Australia. It is located only a few kilometres from the primary airport, Hobart Airport.

Cambridge has been the primary site of aeronautics in Hobart from its opening in the 1920s. In July 1934, the federal government compulsorily acquired 190 acres (77 ha) of land from a local farmer to establish an aerodrome on the current site. It served as Hobart's main airport until the International Airport opened in 1956. Today, it is the base of Par Avion, which specialises in day trips and scenic flights around Hobart and the South West Wilderness of Tasmania; the Aeroclub of Southern Tasmania; and Heli Resources, a helicopter company that focuses on aerial work and flights in Antarctica.

In 1992 it was sold by the Federal Airports Corporation to Par Avion. In June 2024, the aerodrome was put up for sale.

== Accidents and incidents ==
- On 10 March 1946, a Douglas DC-3 aircraft operated by Australian National Airways departed from Cambridge Aerodrome with a crew of four and 21 passengers for Essendon Airport. Less than 2 minutes after take-off, the aircraft crashed at Seven-Mile Beach, killing all on board. At the time, it was Australia's worst civil aviation accident.
