= Launceston Airport =

Airport in Tasmania, Australia

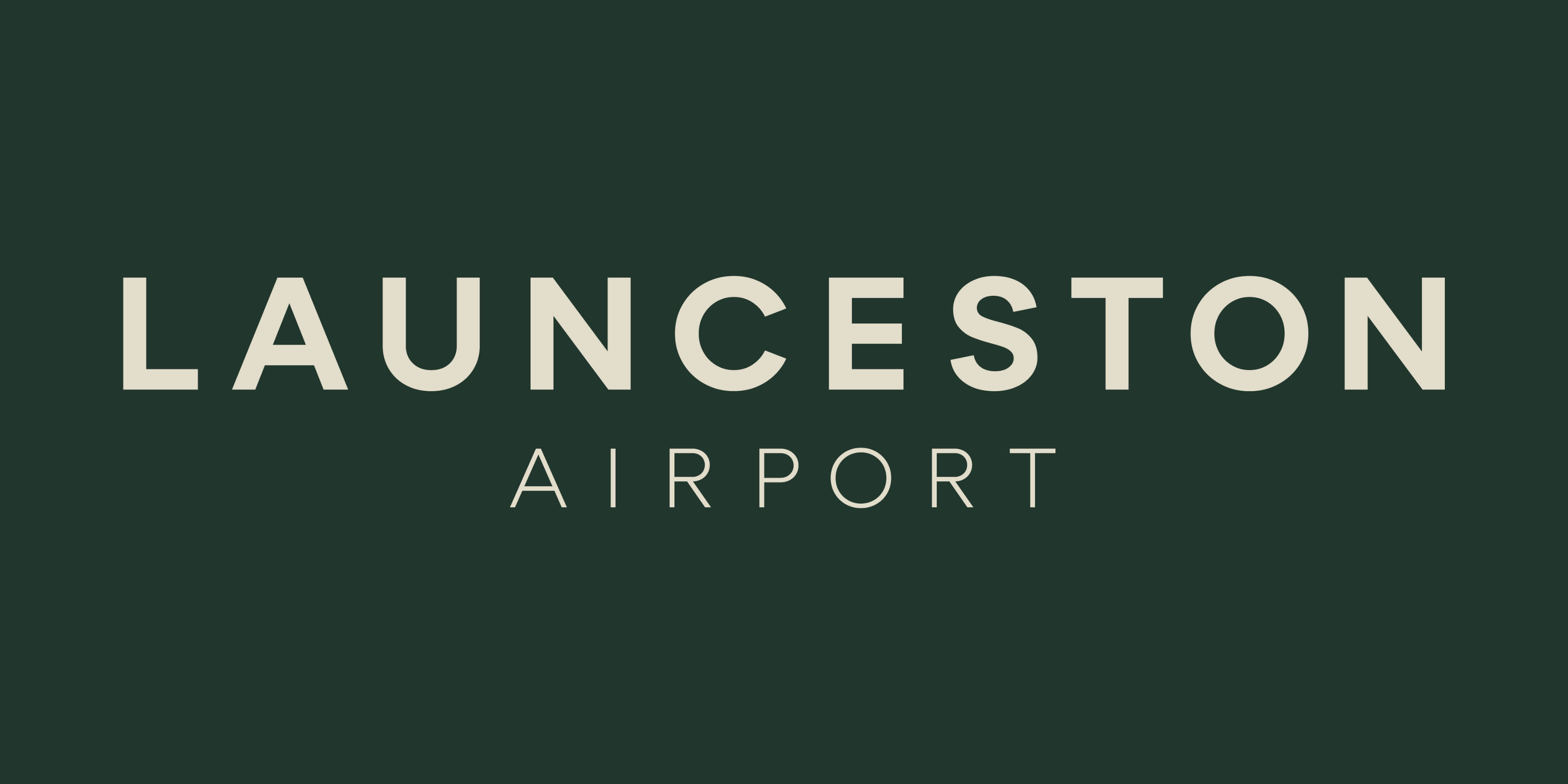

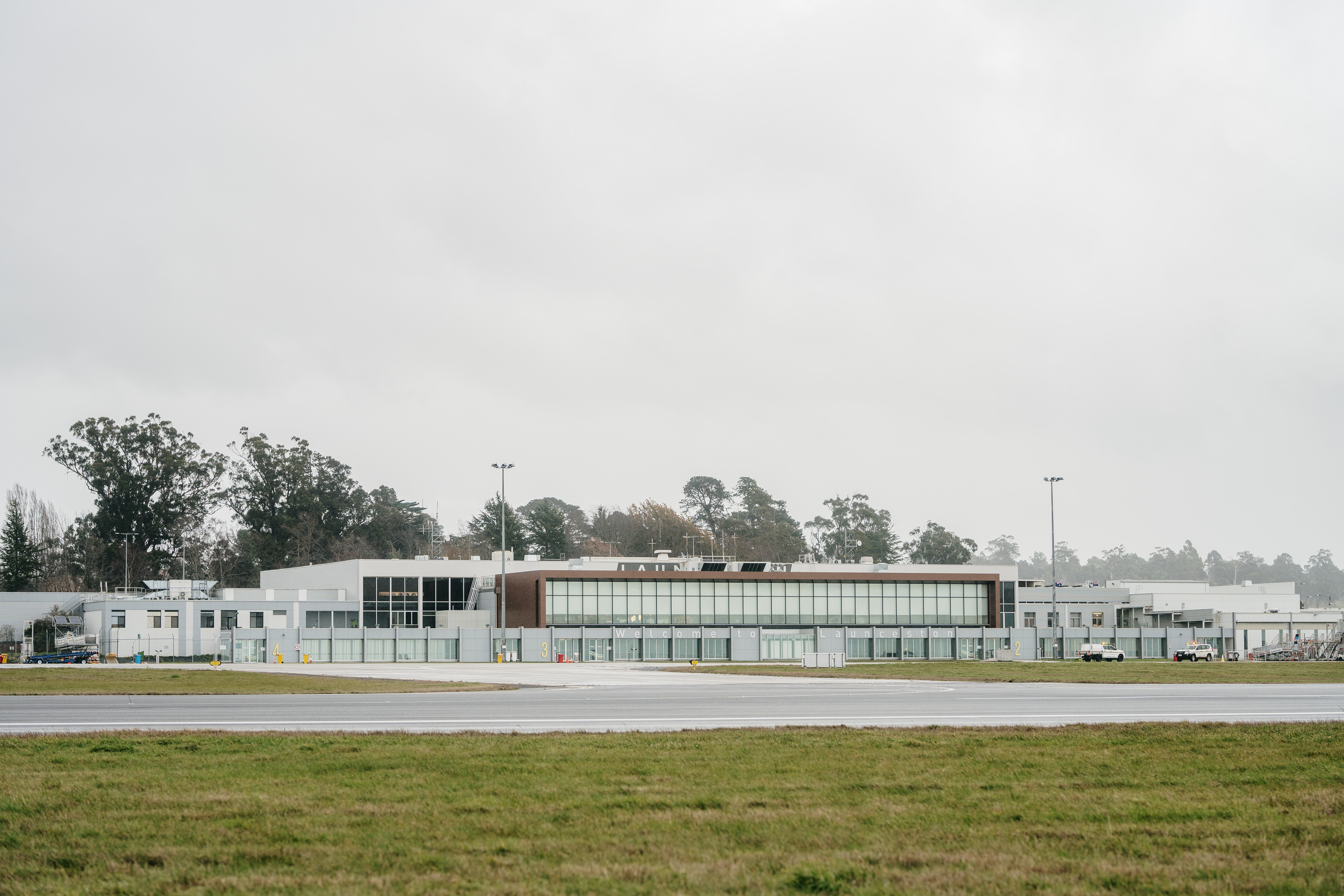
- Launceston Airport Terminal airside, 2023
- IATA: LST; ICAO: YMLT

Summary
- Airport type: Public
- Owner: Launceston City Council; Australia Pacific Airports Corporation
- Operator: Australia Pacific Airports Corporation
- Serves: Launceston
- Elevation AMSL: 562 ft (171 m)
- Coordinates: 41°32′42″S 147°12′54″E
- Website: www.launcestonairport.com.au

Maps
- Location in Tasmania
- Interactive map of Launceston Airport

Runways
Direction	Length		Surface
Direction	m	ft	Surface
14R/32L	1,981	6,499	Asphalt
14L/32R	700	2,297	Grass
18/36	690	2,264	Grass

Statistics (2023/24)
- Passenger: 1.4 million
- Source: Passengers numbers from the Bureau of Infrastructure & Transport Research Economics

Launceston Airport (IATA: LST, ICAO: YMLT) is a regional airport on the outskirts of Launceston, Tasmania. The airport is located in the industrial area of Western Junction, 15 kilometres from Launceston city centre. It is Tasmania's second busiest after Hobart.

== History ==
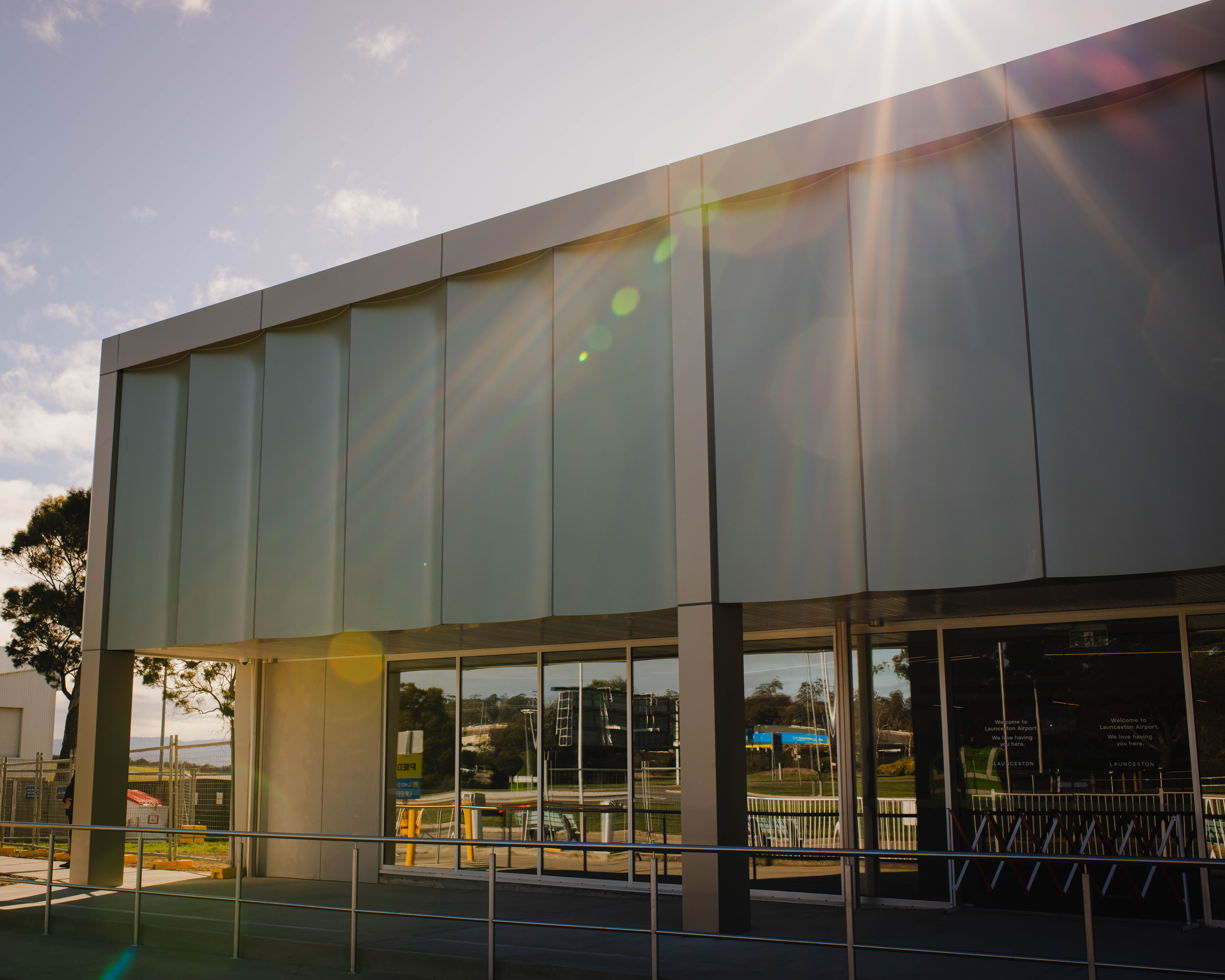
Exterior of airport terminal, 2023

After the formation of the Tasmanian Aero Club in 1927, the first air travel facility in Tasmania was built on the site. In July 1929 the Home Territories Department acquired land at the Western Junction, then also called Valley of Springs, for a £20,400 ($41,000) aerodrome. The Western Junction Aerodrome was officially opened in 1929, and opened for use in 1930.

From August 1940 until late 1944, the airport was used by the Royal Australian Air Force (RAAF) as a base for No. 7 Elementary Flying Training School. It was Tasmania's only RAAF Base. Two of the Bellman hangars from this period are still located at the airport, on the southern Freight and General Aviation operations area.

In 1962, under the leadership of Tony John, a plan for major redevelopment of the airport was approved. This included strengthening of all pavements, a runway extension, and a new two storey terminal building built by Hansen Yuncken. The airport was officially reopened that same year as Launceston Airport. In October 1982 the runway was further upgraded to accommodate Boeing 767s.

In 1998, the airport was privatised, and is now owned jointly by Launceston City Council and Australia Pacific Airports Corporation. The collapse of Ansett Australia in 2001, the introduction of Virgin Blue and Jetstar in 2001 and 2004; and the creation of the Australian low-cost airline market; have all contributed to a dramatic increase in aircraft movements at Launceston Airport. Tiger Airways Australia also introduced services, and withdrew again in July 2010 as did Bonza Airlines in 2024.

== Terminal ==
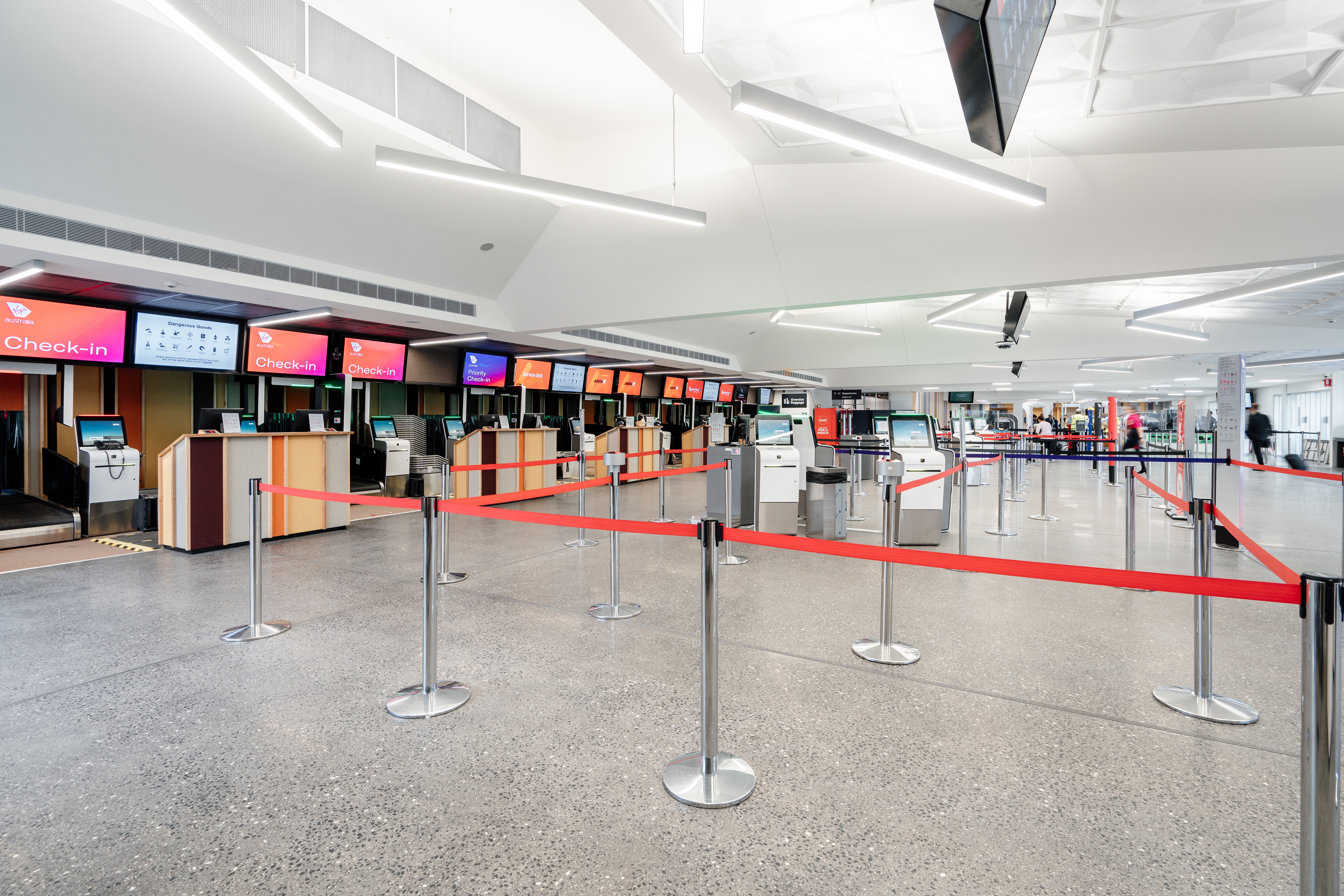
Check-in area, 2023

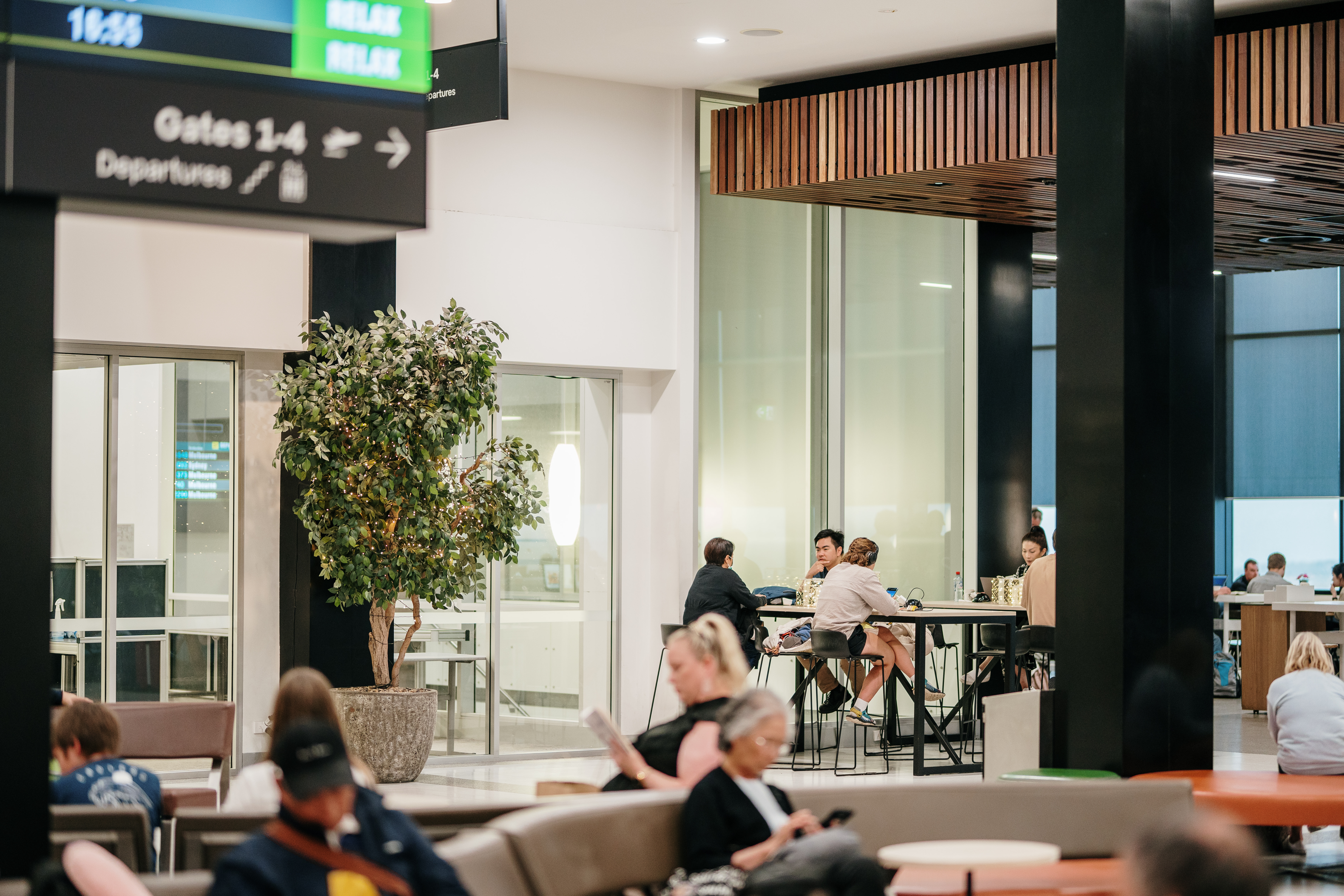
Terminal waiting area, 2023

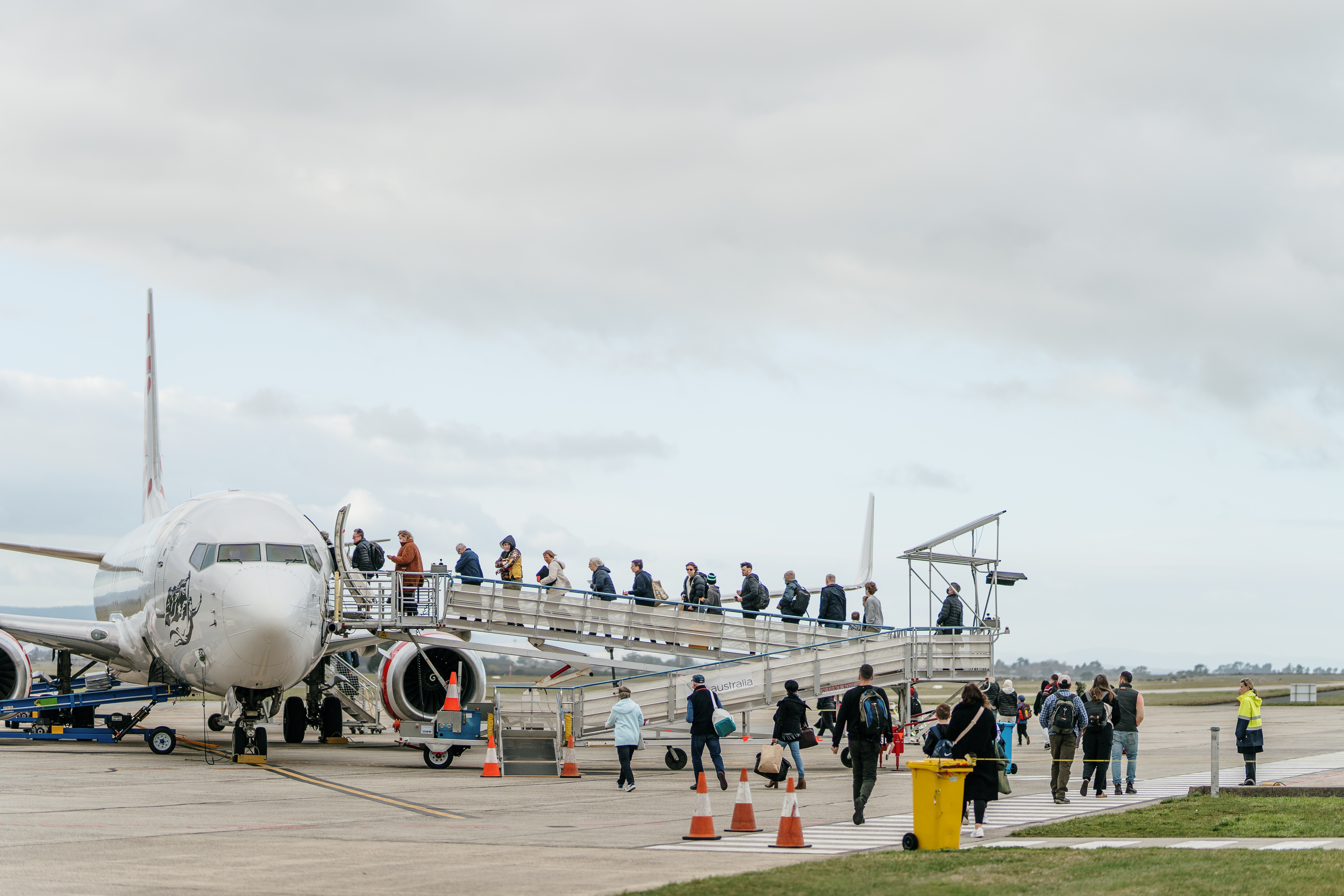
Virgin passengers embarking, 2023

In 2009 a A$20m expansion program commenced that included two new gate lounges and two new baggage carousels and a 1000 m^{2} expansion of the main landside passenger lounge, with views of the apron and runway. The redeveloped terminal was officially opened on 12 March 2010 by the Premier of Tasmania, David Bartlett.

In 2022 Launceston Airport commenced a A$100m redevelopment, the largest expansion in its history. The project includes expansion of the Check-in Hall, security area, new food and beverage outlets, expansion of the Launceston Store and a larger Arrivals Hall to be rolled out within five years.

The airport opened new food and beverage outlets Gatty's Bar and Liv Eat in July 2025, followed by Kanamaluka café later in 2025 and an expanded Launceston Store. The Launceston Store sells convenience items and Tasmanian artisan produce, wine, spirits, art, craft and gifts.

In August 2023, the new check-in hall opened, commencing the first stage of the airport's infrastructure development to improve the passenger experience.

Supported by the State and Federal governments, the project doubled the size of the airport's check-in hall, with an additional 650 square metres offering space for self-check-in equipment and an easier security experience.

13 December 2023 marked the completion of the first phase in the terminal expansion, with new state-of-the-art security screening technology becoming available for airport visitors.

== Airlines and destinations ==
The Qantas Group is the dominant operator at Launceston airport, with Jetstar operating up to six daily flights to/from Melbourne, up to two daily flights to/from Sydney and up to one daily flight to/from Brisbane throughout the year. QantasLink operates up to four flights daily to/from Melbourne, up to two daily flights to/from Sydney and seasonal services to/from Brisbane.

Virgin Australia operates up to four daily flights to/from Melbourne, one daily flight to/from Sydney, between four and seven flights per week to/from Brisbane as well as a number of seasonal flights to/from Adelaide and Perth.

Sharp Airlines offer daily direct flights to Flinders Island and King Island.

Par Avion provide a twice weekly service to Cape Barren Island under the Remote Air Services Subsidy (RASS) scheme. in addition to light aircraft charter.

=== Passenger ===
Airlines	Destinations
Jetstar	Brisbane, Melbourne, Sydney
Link Airways	Canberra
Par Avion	Cape Barren Island
Sharp Airlines	Burnie, Flinders Island, King Island
QantasLink	Brisbane, Melbourne Sydney; Seasonal: Brisbane
Virgin Australia	Brisbane, Melbourne, Sydney, Seasonal: Adelaide

== Traffic and statistics ==
Launceston Airport's passenger numbers have increased dramatically in recent years, significantly exceeding the airports forecasts in the Airport Master Plan 2005. The passenger numbers achieved in the 2007-08 fiscal year were not anticipated until at least fiscal year 2019–20.

=== Statistics ===
Statistics for Launceston Airport
Year	Total passengers	Aircraft movements
1995–96	595,881	
1996–97	586,661	
1997–98	544,185	
1998–99	520,000	
1999–00	540,000	27,600
2000–01	520,000	26,400
2001–02	530,000	21,600
2002–03	580,000	14,900
2003–04	670,000	15,300
2004–05	820,000	15,000
2005–06	920,000	15,000
2006–07	990,000	14,500
2007–08	1,106,000	
2008–09	1,127,000	
2009–10	1,131,000	
2010–11	1,156,000	
2011–12	1,130,000	
2012–13	1,184,000	
2013–14	1,278,000	
2014–15	1,293,000	
2015–16	1,320,952	
2016–17	1,335,133	
2017–18	1,362,700	
2018–19	1,390,909	
2019–20	1,010,713	
2020–21	541,914	
2021-22	745,621	
2022-23	1,295,173	
2023-24	1,424,000	
2024-25	1,435,094	

== Access ==
Primary access to Launceston Airport is via private vehicles. Launceston Airport has a short stay, three long stay and a premium undercover car park. Public transport is not provided between Launceston Airport and the City of Launceston. Numerous taxi services are available as well as Uber from in front of the terminal. There are three private shuttle transfer operators servicing the Airport to and from Launceston and surrounding towns.

Tassielink Transit bus route "Evandale-Perth-Longford- Cressy" formerly had three daily buses calling on Evandale Road outside Launceston Airport, which were suspended during the COVID-19 pandemic. The closest currently operational bus stop is 34 minutes away, at Hobart Road cnr Raeburn Road, with several daily services to Launceston and various regional towns.

In 2025 the Tasmanian Liberals announced plans to pilot a SkyBus service from Launceston Airport to the Launceston CBD.

A SkyBus service was launched in November 2026.

== Accidents and incidents ==
- On 17 March 1965, a Fokker F27 Friendship of Ansett-ANA crashed at the airport. The aircraft, which had departed from Flinders Island with 19 passengers and 4 crew on board experienced problems with the left engine shortly before arrival. The subsequent single engine approach was flown in wind shear conditions and became unstable. The pilots attempted a go around, but lost directional control resulting in the left wing striking the ground, rupturing the fuel tanks and spinning the aircraft 180 degrees. Despite a post-impact fire, all 23 occupants survived.
- On 29 May 2003, Qantas Flight 1737 en route from Melbourne Airport was involved in an attempted hijacking shortly after takeoff. The would-be hijacker, a passenger named David Robinson, intended to fly the aircraft into the Walls of Jerusalem National Park located in central Tasmania. The flight attendants and passengers successfully subdued and restrained Robinson, and the aircraft returned to Melbourne, where it landed safely.
