= Burnie Airport =

Burnie Airport Wynyard Airport
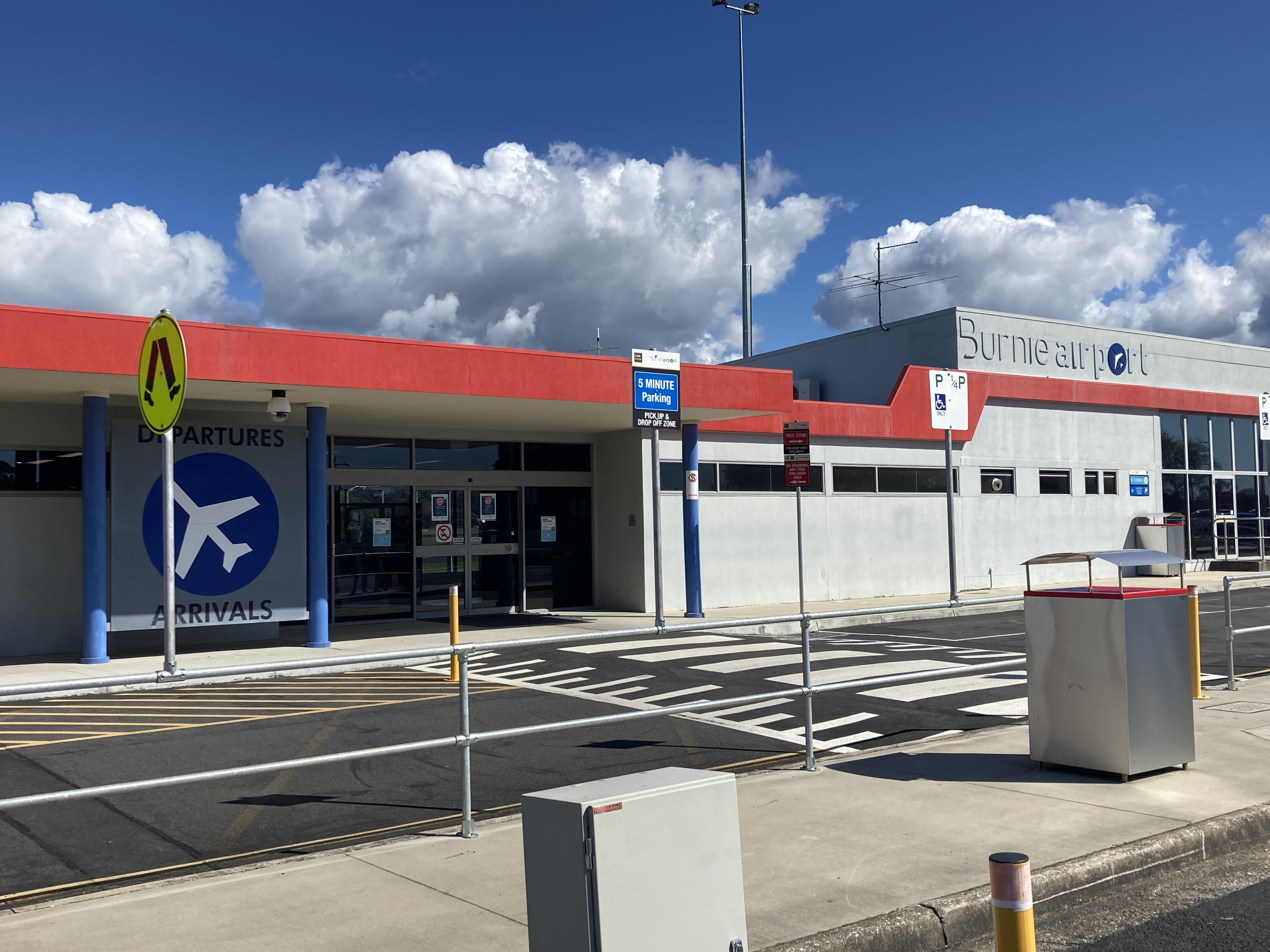
- IATA: BWT; ICAO: YWYY

Summary
- Airport type: Public
- Owner/Operator: Burnie Airport Corporation
- Serves: Burnie, Tasmania
- Location: Wynyard, Tasmania
- Opened: 26 February 1934
- Elevation AMSL: 62 ft (19 m)
- Coordinates: 40°59′56″S 145°43′52″E
- Website: www.burnieairport.com.au

Maps
- Location in Tasmania
- Interactive map of Burnie Airport

Runways
Direction	Length		Surface
Direction	m	ft	Surface
09/27	1,650	5,413	Asphalt
05/23	827	2,713	Asphalt

Statistics (2016/17)
- Passengers: 59,861
- Aircraft movements: 3,929
- Sources: Australian AIP and aerodrome chart, passenger and aircraft movements from the Department of Infrastructure & Regional Development

Burnie Airport (IATA: BWT, ICAO: YWYY), also called Burnie Wynyard Airport or Wynyard Airport, is a regional airport located adjacent to the town of Wynyard, about 17 kilometres (11 mi) west of Burnie, Tasmania, Australia. Formally named the Wynyard Aerodrome, the first official opening occurred on 26 February 1934. It is majority owned by the Burnie City Council.

== History ==
The first aerodrome at Wynyard was built by volunteers on an old racecourse. However, within a year of completion in 1932, the aerodrome was found to be too small for larger passenger and mail aircraft. A larger aerodrome was developed on the southern outskirts of the town and was officially opened on 26 February 1934. A further opening ceremony on 1 January 1935 was attended by the Prime Minister of the time, Joseph Lyons.

In the mid-1970s, a Federal policy was adopted that would eventually see the ownership and maintenance of all airports outside of capital cities transferred from the Commonwealth to the respective local authorities. Under the new scheme, the future of the Wynyard Aerodrome was cast into doubt after Federal funding was secured for upgrading the Devonport Airport in August 1980; few if any areas of regional Australia had two major commuter and cargo airports only 60 km apart, which was the situation for Burnie/Wynyard and Devonport. After much political controversy, it wasn't until March 1985 that $5.2 million of funding was allocated by the State and Federal governments to upgrade the Wynyard aerodrome.

The upgraded aerodrome was officially opened on 15 February 1987, incorporating a sealed runway 1650m long. Ownership had been transferred from the Commonwealth to the Burnie Port Authority and the Wynyard Aerodrome was renamed to Burnie Airport. The airport's IATA code was changed from WNY to BWT.

The Burnie Airport Corporation Unit Trust acquired the Burnie Airport from the Burnie Port Corporation in 2001.

== At-grade railway crossing ==
Until the early 2000s, Burnie was one of the few airports to have a railway line crossing an active runway, with the Western line from Burnie to Wiltshire crossing through the northern end of runway 05/23. The railway line has not been in operation since 2003.

== Airlines and destinations ==
Rex Airlines operates services to and from Melbourne about four times per day using Saab 340 turboprop aircraft. Sharp Airlines offers flights to King Island and Launceston twice per day using a 19-seat Metro 23 (SA-227) turboprop aircraft.

On 17 September 2021, QantasLink resumed direct seven weekly flights to Melbourne for the first time in 15 years with its 50-seat Q300 turboprop aircraft. In 2025, QantasLink upgraded its aircraft to 74-seat Q400 turboprops, following upgrades to the airport by the Tasmanian Government.

Airlines	Destinations
QantasLink	Melbourne
Rex Airlines	Melbourne
Sharp Airlines	King Island, Launceston

== Notable accidents and incidents ==
- On 13 April 1975, after taking off from Burnie Airport, a parachutist was drowned in a dam following a free fall descent 18.5 kilometres (11.5 mi) south of Wynyard. For reasons which have not been determined, the parachutist did not or was unable to control his descent so as to avoid landing in the dam which was some 500 metres (1,600 ft) from the designated drop zone.
- On 12 January 1997, a Piper PA-28 Cherokee suffered engine power loss during the initial climb shortly after takeoff. Attempts to recover the engine were unsuccessful and due to the low altitude, the aircraft was stalled into the water at the mouth of the Inglis River about 2 kilometres (1.2 mi) from the aerodrome. The pilot and two passengers suffered minor injuries as a result of the crash. The subsequent Australian Transport Safety Bureau investigation was hindered by the extensive damage to the aircraft, but it was suspected that the air duct hose had collapsed resulting in reduced air supply to the engine. It was determined that the type of hose was not designated by the manufacturer to be installed in the air inlet system.

== Statistics ==
Burnie Airport was ranked 55th in Australia for the total number of revenue passengers served in the financial year 2016–2017.

Annual passenger and aircraft statistics for Burnie Airport
Financial Year Ending	Revenue passengers total	Aircraft movements total
1986*	140,255	9,654
1991*	77,540	8,102
1996*	112,499	8,936
2001*	92,237	6,524
2006*	93,381	7,129
2007	87,529	6,384
2008	95,275	6,835
2009	86,916	6,419
2010	79,340	4,553
2011	70,402	3,050
2012	69,078	4,026
2013	67,088	3,987
2014	66,771	3,926
2015	62,240	3,888
2016	62,020	3,929
2017	59,861	3,929
*Showing annual statistics every 5 years (then yearly afterwards)
