= National Jet Express =

Australian airline

National Jet Express (NJE)
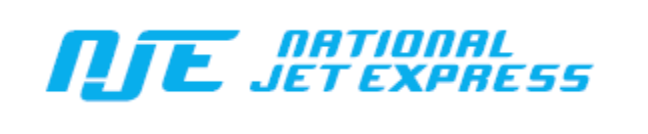

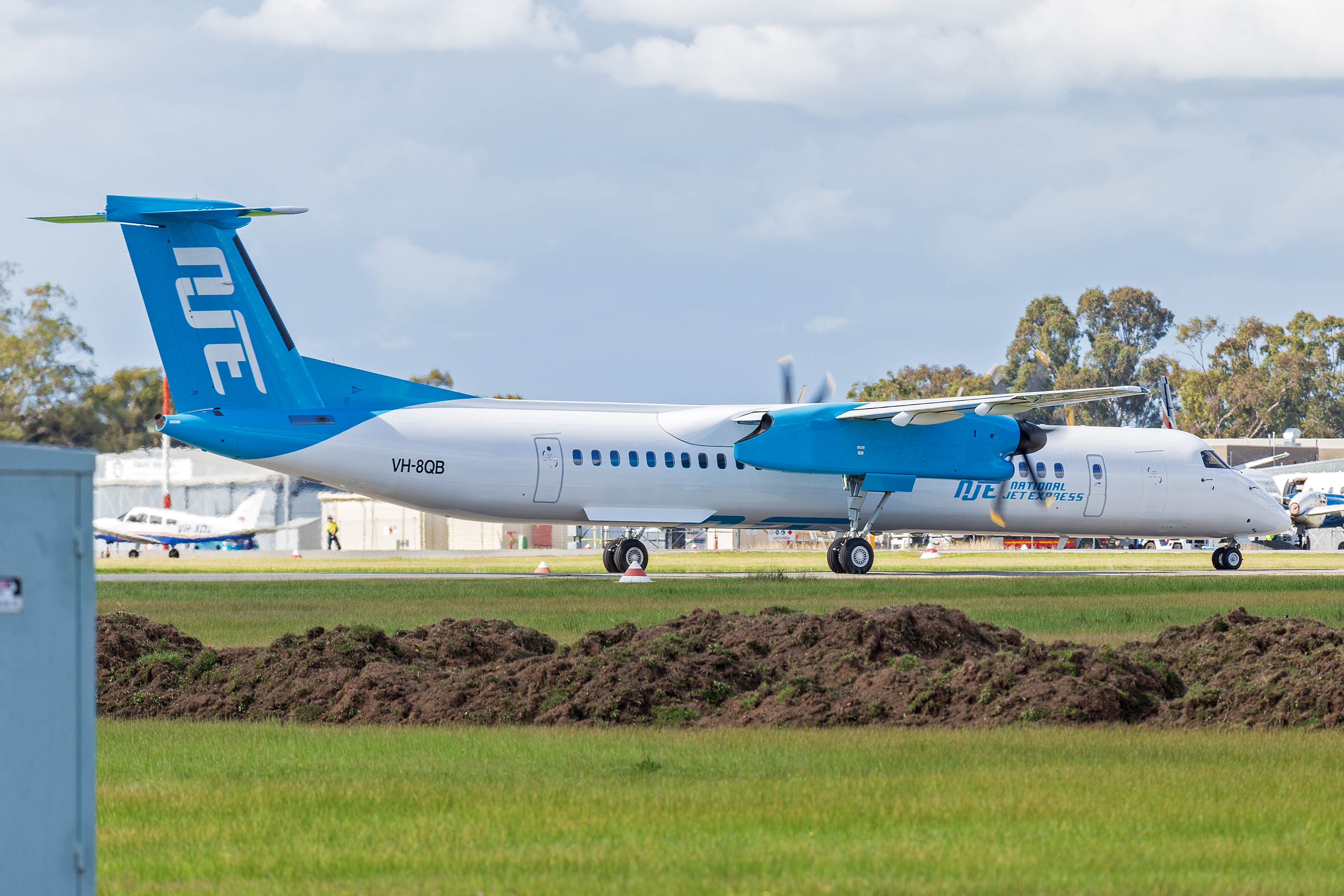
- De Havilland Canada DHC-8-402 in the new National Jet Express livery
IATA	ICAO	Call sign
WO	JTE	JETEX
- Founded: 1994; 32 years ago
- Operating bases: Adelaide; Brisbane; Perth
- Subsidiaries: Asia Pacific Airlines
- Fleet size: 23
- Headquarters: Perth Airport, Western Australia
- Website: www.nje.aero

National Jet Express (formerly Cobham Aviation Services Australia - Regional Services) is an Australian charter airline and aviation services provider with its headquarters in Perth, Western Australia.

== History ==
National Jet Express was established in 1994 as a subsidiary of National Jet Systems to operate charter and scheduled services under National Jet's own branding, using the British Aerospace 146, British Aerospace Jetstream and Dash 8 aircraft. Dedicated freighter services were also operated on behalf of Australian airExpress using the BAe 146, as well as a Boeing 727. Additional freighter capacity was obtained using a leased Boeing 737-300QC from March 1994 until March 1996.

In 1999, National Jet Systems, including its subsidiaries National Jet Express and Surveillance Australia, were acquired by Cobham.

In 2009, National Jet Express was rebranded as Cobham Aviation Services Australia - Regional Services to align its branding with the broader Cobham group and to differentiate its role from that of National Jet Systems. The airline also announced that it would operate regular public transport flights to Kambalda as an extension of its existing charter services for mining company Gold Fields. These flights were later transferred to Skippers Aviation.

In 2010, Cobham was awarded a six-year contract from Chevron for aviation transport services to Barrow Island in support of the Gorgon gas project. The contract was valued at $AUD170 million and, at the time, was heralded as the largest in Australian aviation history. The service initially operated using Avro RJ100 aircraft, in addition to the BAe 146–300.

In July 2014, Cobham announced a four-year contract from Gold Fields for the provision of fly-in fly-out services to the Granny Smith and Darlot mine sites. As part of this contract NJE operated an 82-seat Avro RJ85 equipped with gravel kit allowing the jet aircraft to land on gravel runways.

In September 2014, Cobham introduced the first Embraer E190 to be used in the Australian closed charter sector. Acquired for use on its services to Barrow Island, the 104 seat E190 introduced a new livery and operated the route alongside the existing Avro RJ100 aircraft. The contract was said to be worth more than $160 million. The aircraft was withdrawn in March 2018, but was replaced with another E190 in May 2019.

On 29 February 2016, after 25 years of service, flights from Adelaide to Moomba and Ballera on behalf of Santos Limited ceased after the service was recontracted with Alliance Airlines.

In August 2017, flights from Adelaide to Port Augusta and Prominent Hill commenced on behalf of Oz Minerals.

In June 2018, Cobham donated the forward section of one of their retired BAe 146 aircraft to the South Australian Aviation Museum. The section features the flight deck, forward galley and cabin, and is intended to be turned into an interactive exhibit.

In August 2019, Cobham commenced flights with the Dash 8 Q400 on selected charter services.

In January 2020, Cobham and all of its subsidiaries were acquired by Advent International.

On 4 November 2021, passenger operations using the BAe 146 and Avro RJ in Western Australia ceased. The 146/RJ fleet was relocated to South Australia, where they operated their last passenger service on 3 June 2022 from Port Augusta to Adelaide.

On 15 July 2022, Rex Freight and Charter Pty Ltd (a subsidiary of Rex Airlines) announced its intent to purchase National Jet Express for $48 million. The acquisition was completed on September 30, 2022, with services and aircraft retaining the Cobham branding in the interim.

In January 2023, the airline confirmed that it would revive its National Jet Express branding, with the Cobham name and livery to be progressively retired.

The airline announced that from July 2023 it would open a new base of operations at Brisbane Airport with Q400 aircraft, supporting the provision of fly-in fly-out services to Moranbah for BHP Mitsubishi Alliance.

== Operations ==
National Jet Express is headquartered at Perth Airport, with hubs at Adelaide, Brisbane, Melbourne and Sydney.

The company operates freight services on behalf of Qantas Freight, with four British Aerospace 146-300QT freighters providing overnight services to and from curfew-restricted Sydney Airport.

National Jet Express also operates dedicated scheduled charter services across its regional network, transporting fly-in, fly-out (FIFO) personnel for clients in the resources industry. These services are operated using the Embraer E190 and Bombardier Dash 8 Q400 aircraft.

National Jet Express has also developed "turnkey" transportation systems, including airport management and reservations services, for major Australian infrastructure projects such as Santos's Cooper Basin gas fields at Moomba and Ballera in the heart of Australia, Chevron's Barrow Island operations into a Class "A" nature reserve with strict quarantine requirements, along with operations for Ok Tedi gold and copper mine in Papua New Guinea.

== Destinations ==
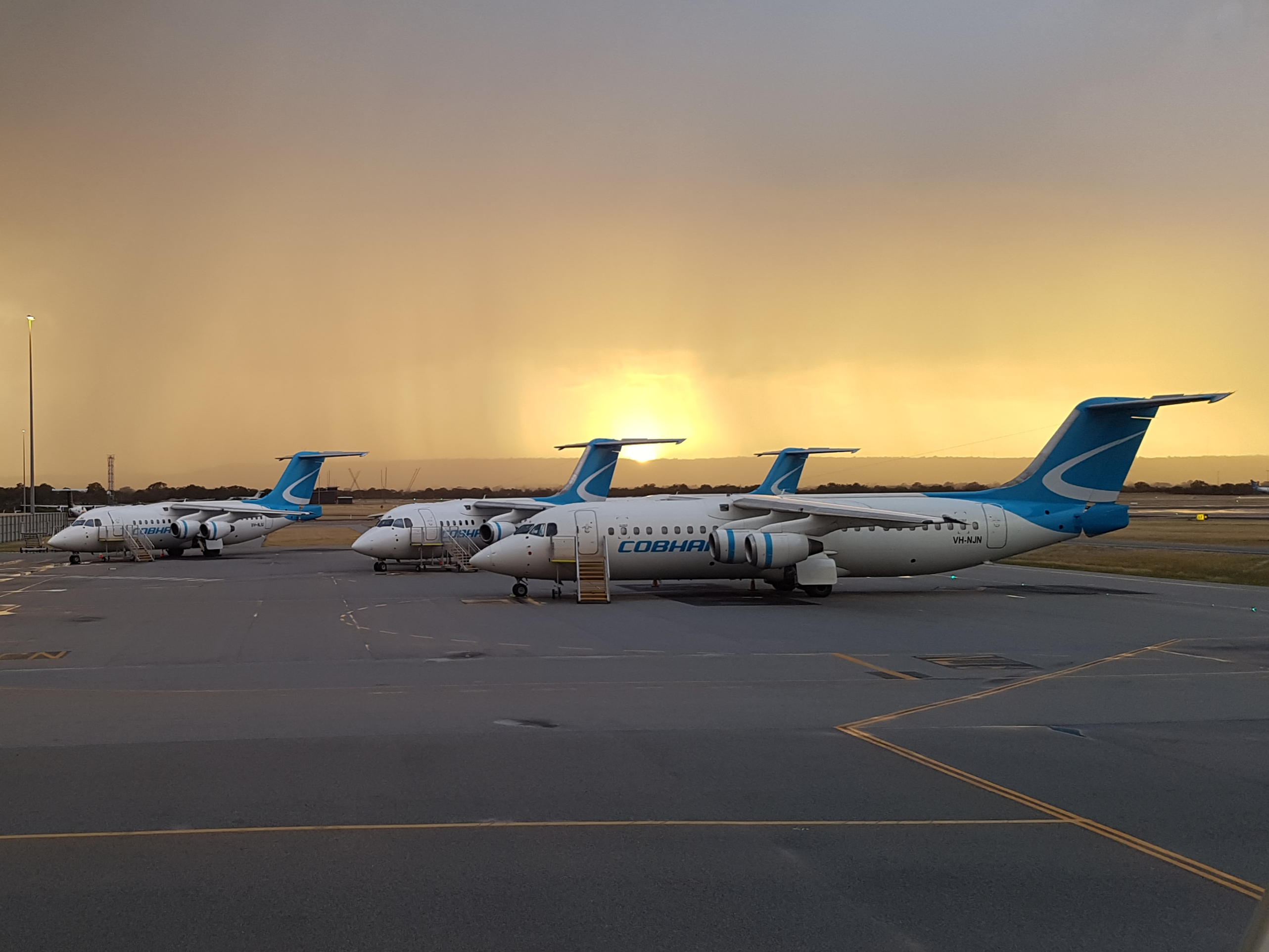
National Jet British Aerospace 146s at Perth Airport, in the Cobham livery.

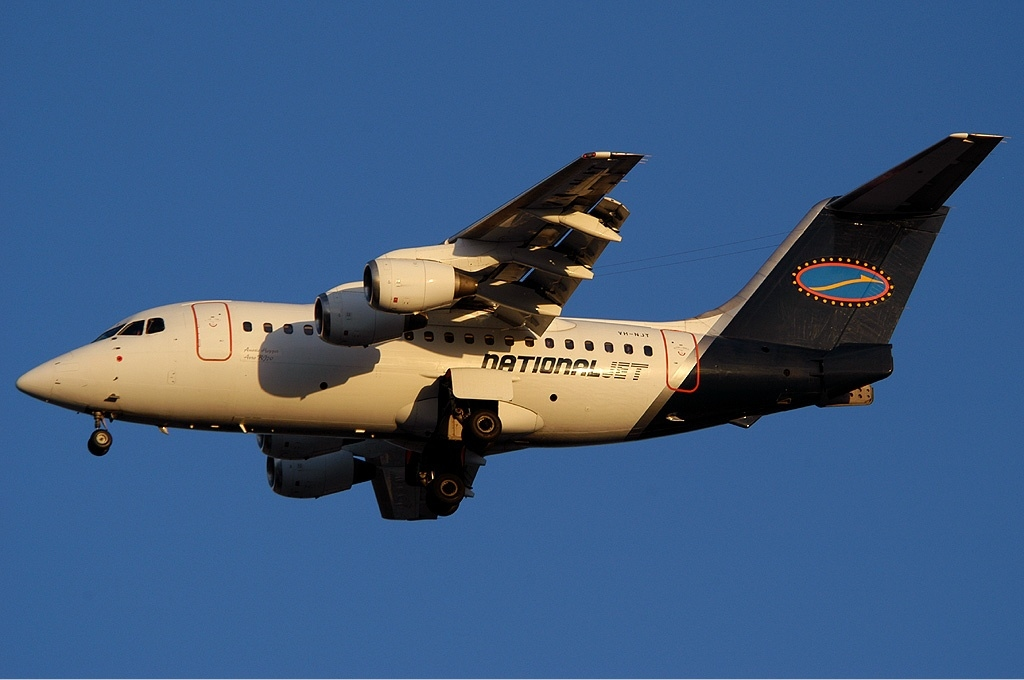
National Jet Avro RJ70 (2003), in the original livery.

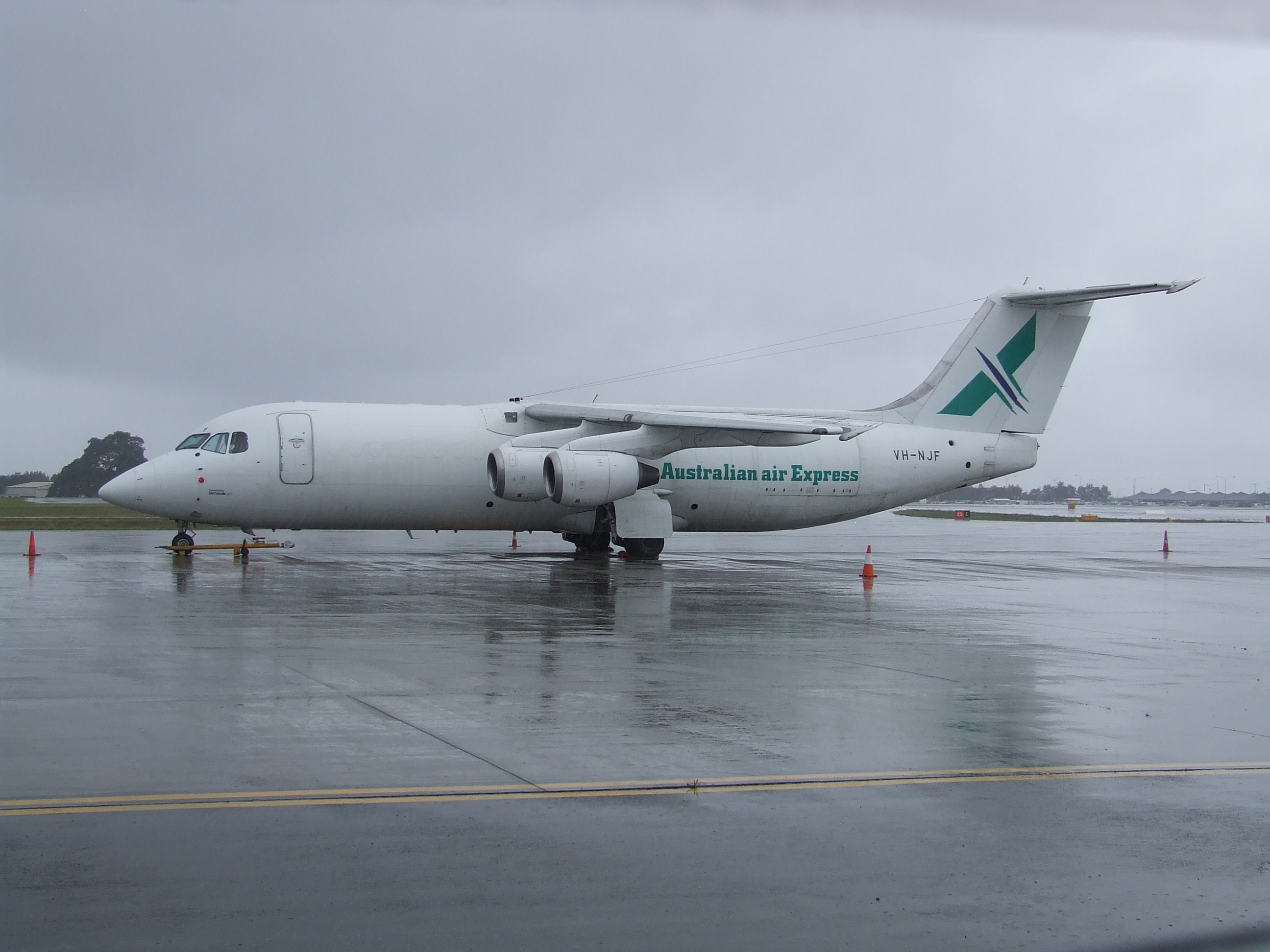
A National Jet British Aerospace 146-300QT in the colours of Australian airExpress (2008).

National Jet Express's operations can be broken into two separate branches: scheduled operations on behalf of Qantas Freight, and an extensive closed charter operation in support of the mining industry.

National Jet Express charter services

- Queensland
  - Brisbane (Brisbane Airport)
  - Moranbah
- South Australia
  - Adelaide (Adelaide Airport)
  - Carrapateena
  - Port Augusta
  - Prominent Hill
- Western Australia
  - Abra Base Metals Project
  - Barrow Island
  - Cue
  - Jundee Gold Mine
  - Karara
  - Karlawinda
  - Laverton
  - Leonora
  - Meekatharra
  - Mount Keith
  - Murrin Murrin
  - Nova Nickel-Copper Mine
  - Perth (Perth Airport)
  - Plutonic Gold Mine
  - Sunrise Dam Gold Mine
  - Tropicana Gold Mine

Freight scheduled destinations for Qantas Freight

- New South Wales
  - Sydney (Sydney Airport)
- Queensland
  - Brisbane (Brisbane Airport)
  - Gold Coast (Gold Coast Airport)
- South Australia
  - Adelaide (Adelaide Airport)
- Victoria
  - Melbourne (Melbourne Airport)

== Fleet ==
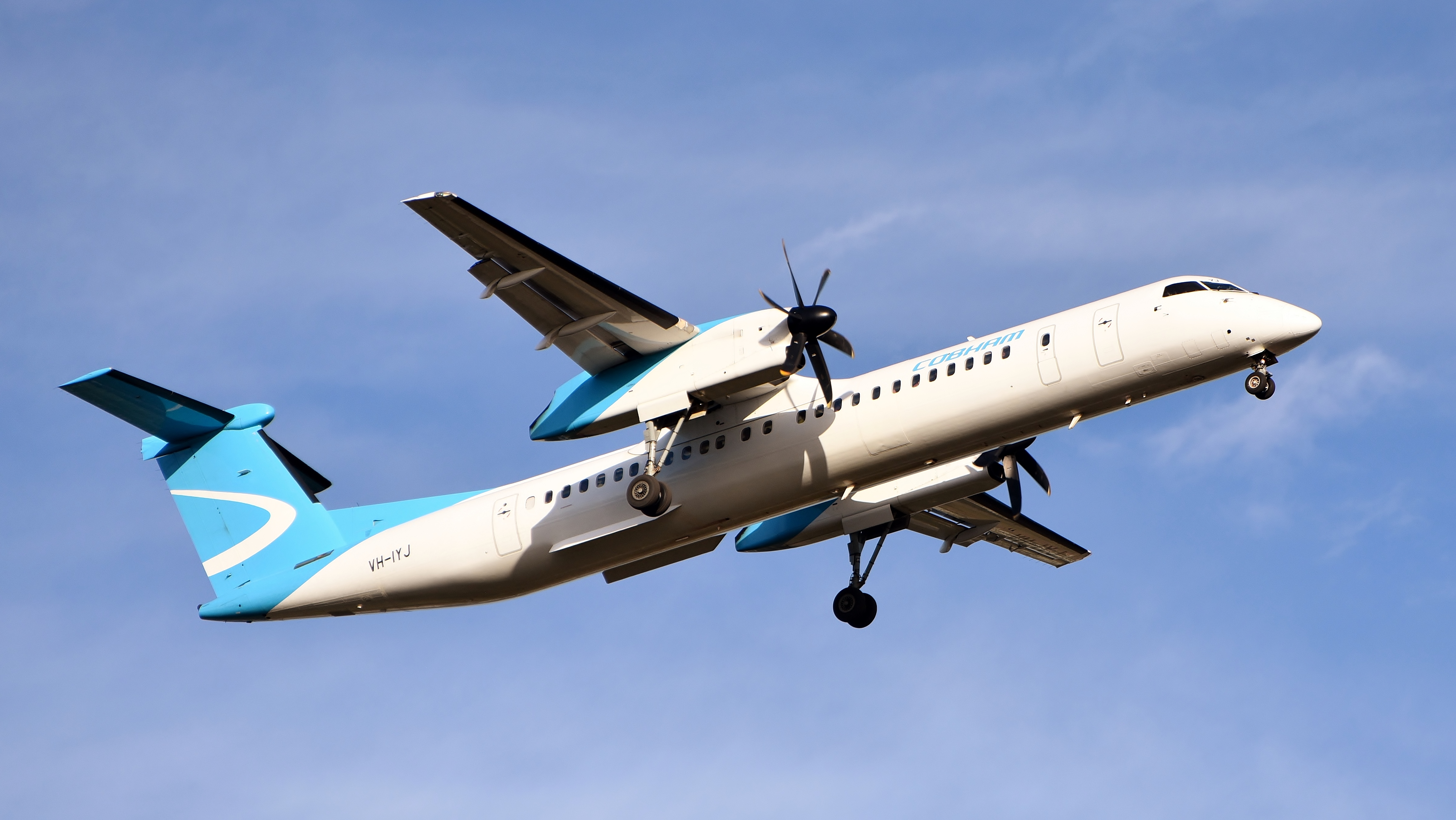
A De Havilland Canada DHC-8-402 in Cobham livery, 2022

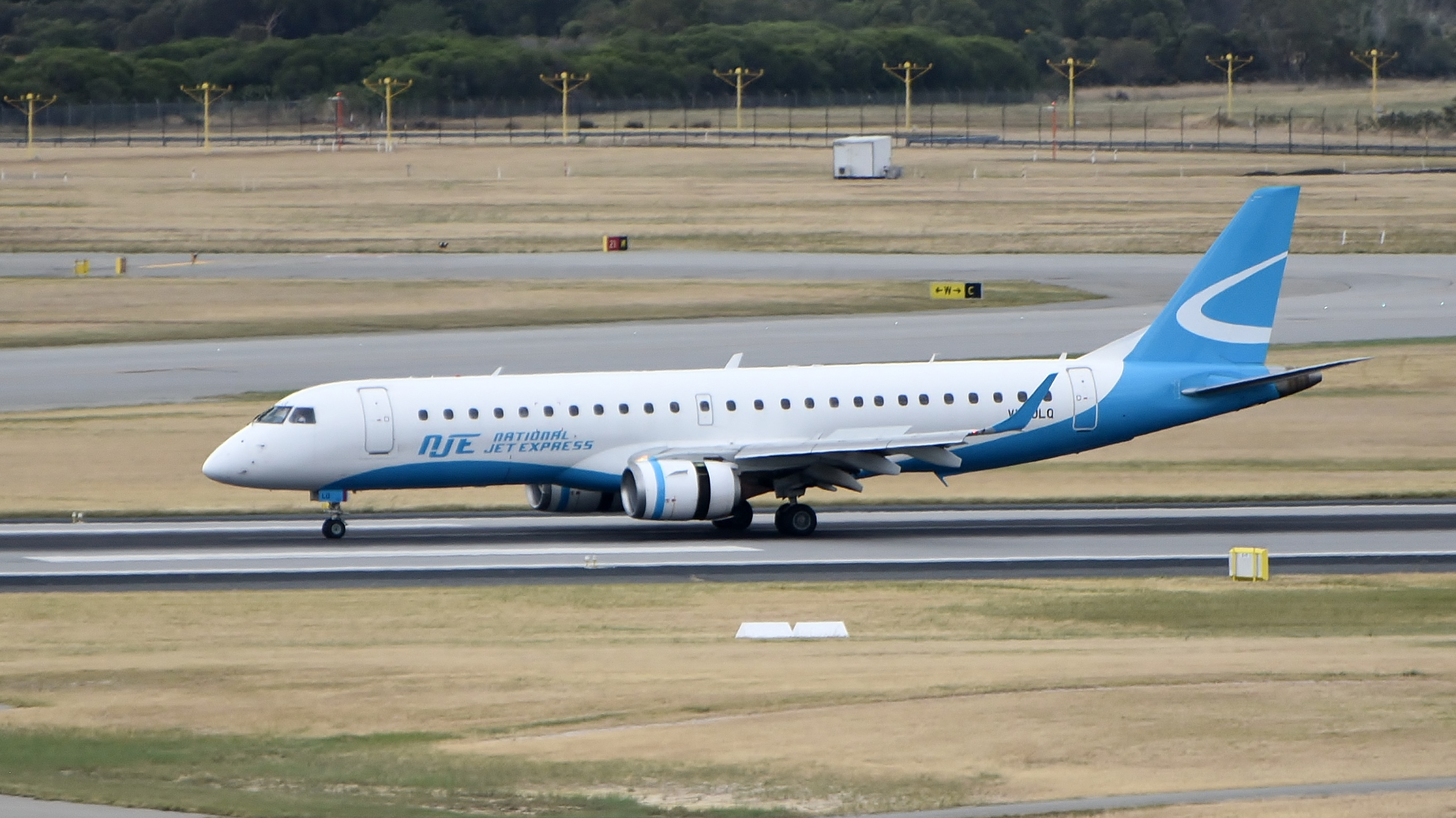
An Embraer E190 in the National Jet Express livery at Perth Airport

As of August 2025, National Jet Express operates the following aircraft:

Aircraft	In service	On order	Notes
British Aerospace 146-300QT	4	-	Operated for Qantas Freight.
De Havilland Canada Dash 8-400	11	2	
Embraer E190	8	-	
Total	23	2	

== Incidents ==
- 29 April 2014: The no. 2 engine of a National Jet Express Avro RJ100, registration VH-NJI, failed shortly after take-off from Perth. Witnesses described a trail of sparks leaving the back of the No. 2 (left-hand, inner) engine. The aircraft made a successful landing with no injuries.
- 30 July 2019: A National Jet Express Avro RJ85 made contact with a lighting structure at Perth Airport and was subsequently damaged beyond economical repair. The final report attributed a loss of brake pressure and pilot error as contributing factors.

== See also ==
- List of airlines of Australia
