= List of airlines of Australia =

The airline industry in Australia began in the early 1920s with Western Australian Airways on the west coast, and Australian Aircraft & Engineering on the east coast. In 1920 (November), Qantas was formed, and continues to operate.

This is a list of airlines that have a current air operator's certificate issued by the Civil Aviation Safety Authority.

== Scheduled airlines ==
Airline	IATA	ICAO	Callsign	Image	Hub airport(s)	Notes
Air Link	LZ				Dubbo	Ceased passenger services January 2018. Recommenced passenger services in November 2019.
Airnorth	TL	ANO	TOPEND		Darwin	Operates scheduled services to regional airports in Queensland, Western Australia and the Northern Territory. Also has an international service to Timor Leste.
Alliance Airlines	QQ	UTY	UNITY		Brisbane	Owns and operates a fleet of Fokker aircraft including Fokker 70 and Fokker 100 jet aircraft. Operates Virgin Australia branded flights, as well as closed charter and FIFO for mining operations around Australia. They have also wet-leased several Embraer 190s to Qantas since June 2021.
ASL Airlines Australia	PH	SFZ	PIONAIR		Sydney	Operates BAe 146 Freighters on behalf of Qantas Freight, typically under the Qantas callsign.
Aviair	GD				Kununurra	Previously known as Slingair Heliworks.
Eastern Air Services					Port Macquarie	Based in Port Macquarie with RPT between Lord Howe Island and Port Macquarie, Newcastle and Gold Coast.
FlyPelican	FP	FRE	PELICAN		Newcastle	Regional airline operating in NSW, ACT and Queensland with a fleet of 5 Jetstream 32 aircraft.
Fly Tiwi					Darwin	Owned by Hardy Aviation.
Hinterland Aviation	OI	HND	HINTERLAND		Cairns, Townsville	Operates 2 Beechcraft King Air B200, 8 Cessna 208 Caravan, 2 Cessna 404, 2 Cessna 402 and 1 Cessna 310 aircraft.
Jetstar	JQ	JST	JETSTAR		Melbourne	Low-cost subsidiary of Qantas.
King Island Airlines	KG				Melbourne–Moorabbin	Operates scheduled services between Moorabbin Airport and King Island Airport.
Link Airways	FC	FCA	LINKAIR		Brisbane	Airline operated by Corporate Air. Formally known as Fly Corporate.
Nexus Airlines	GD		CONNECT		Geraldton, Broome	A regional airline with bases in Geraldton and Broome. Primarily operates to coastal airports in Western Australia.
Par Avion	FO	ATM	AIRTAS		Launceston, Hobart–Cambridge	A regional airline based in Hobart, Tasmania. It operates scheduled services for five locations in Tasmania.
Qantas	QF	QFA	QANTAS		Sydney, Melbourne, Brisbane	
QantasLink	QF	QLK; NWK	Q-LINK; NET-LINK		Sydney, Melbourne, Brisbane, Perth	Owned by Qantas.
Rex Airlines	ZL	RXA	REX		Sydney, Melbourne, Perth	Formally known as Regional Express Airlines.
Sharp Airlines	SH	SHA	SHARP		Hamilton	
Skippers Aviation	HK		SKIPPY s		Perth	
Skytrans Australia	QN	SKP	SKYTRANS		Cairns, Brisbane, Horn Island	An airline and air charter business based in Cairns, Queensland, owned by Avia Solutions Group.
Virgin Australia	VA	VOZ	VELOCITY		Brisbane, Melbourne, Sydney	
Virgin Australia Regional Airlines	VA	VOZ	VELOCITY		Perth	
West Wing Aviation					Cairns	Sister company to Skytrans. All flights operated by SkyTrans

== Charter airlines ==
Airline	IATA	ICAO	Callsign	Image	Hub airport(s)	Notes
Aerlink	HT				Perth Airport	
Air Gold Coast		AGC	AGC		Gold Coast Airport	
Air Fraser Island					Gold Coast Airport	
East Air					Cairns Airport, Weipa Airport	Operates under East Air and Weipa Air.
GAM Air					Essendon Airport	Operates Twin Commander, Cessna Caravan and Dornier 228 Aircraft.
Great Southern Air					Brisbane Airport	Operates Embraer 190 providing FIFO services in Queensland.
Hardy Aviation					Darwin International Airport	
Hevilift	HT		HEVILIFT		Brisbane Airport	
Maroomba Airlines	KN				Perth Airport	Operates Dash 8-100 and -300 aircraft.
National Jet Express	NC	JTE	JETEX		Adelaide Airport	Operates Bombardier Q400, Embraer E190 and as Cobham Aviation Services Australia.
Network Aviation	QF	NWK	NETLINK		Perth Airport	Operates Fokker 100 and Airbus A320 aircraft under the QantasLink brand.
Pel-Air	PA	PFY	PELFLIGHT		Sydney Airport	Pel-Air is a wholly owned subsidiary of Regional Express Holdings.
RMA Gold Airways					Perth Airport	
Seair Pacific					Gold Coast Airport	Tourism and Charter Operator. Provides air services to Lady Elliot Island.
Shoal Air					East Kimberley Regional Airport	
Southern Airlines					Moorabbin Airport	Charter and tour airline operating Beechcraft 1900, Beechcraft Super King Air, Turbo Commander 690, Piper PA-31 Chieftain and Beechcraft Baron.
Skytraders		SND	SNOWBIRD		Melbourne Airport	
Sydney Seaplanes					Rose Bay Water Airport	Is a domestic and charter carrier in and around the Sydney Region and is the largest seaplane operator in Australia.

== Cargo airlines ==
Airline	IATA	ICAO	Callsign	Image	Hub airport(s)	Notes
ASL Airlines Australia	PH	PHA	PARSEC		Brisbane Airport	Operates B737-800BCF Freighters on behalf of FedEx.
Express Freighters Australia	QE	EFA	EXPRESS FREIGHT		Sydney Airport	Owned by Qantas Freight, a subsidiary of Qantas.
National Jet Express	NC	JTE	JETEX		Adelaide Airport	Operates BAe 146 / Avro RJ Freighters on behalf of Qantas Freight.
Pel-Air	PA	PFY	PELFLIGHT		Brisbane Airport	Operates Saab 340 Freighters on behalf of Qantas Freight.
Qantas Freight	QF	QFA	QANTAS		Sydney Airport, Melbourne Airport	
Tasman Cargo Airlines	HJ	TMN	TASMAN		Sydney Airport	Operates one Boeing 767-300F for freight operations.
Team Global Express		TFX	TOLL EXPRESS		Bankstown Airport, Brisbane Airport	

== See also ==
- List of defunct airlines of Australia
- List of airlines

== Bibliography ==
- Affleck, A. H. (1964). The wandering years. Longmans, Green and Co. Ltd.
- Brogden, S. (1960). The history of Australian aviation. Melbourne: The Hawthorn Press.
- Airline history of Australia. Kogarah: Aironautica.
