= Pacific Air Express =

Australian airline based in Brisbane

IATA	ICAO	Call sign
PE	PAQ	SOLPAC
- Founded: 1993
- Ceased operations: 2021
- Operating bases: Brisbane Airport
- Fleet size: 0
- Headquarters: Brisbane, Queensland, Australia
- Website: www.pacificairexpress.com.au

Pacific Air Express was an airline based in Brisbane, Queensland, Australia. It operated cargo services to Honiara, Nauru, Noumea, Port Moresby and Port Vila; and charter flights in the South Pacific area. Its main bases were Brisbane Airport and Honiara International Airport.

== History ==
The airline was established in 1993 by Australian expatriate Gary Clifford (Managing Director/CEO) and a business partner from the Solomon Islands. The airline was originally based in Honiara but relocated due to civil unrest in 1999. It had 35 employees as of March 2007. In 2021 its wet lease agreement with Qantas Freight on the Melbourne to Perth route ended, being replaced with Express Freighters Australia Airbus A321-200P2Fs.

== Fleet ==
In October 2021 the airline's final aircraft (a Boeing 757-200 registered VH-PQA) left Australia. The airline owns a second Boeing 757-200 (registration N314ST, msn 22211) but it remains in storage in Budapest, having never actually flown to Australia. The airline appears now to be dormant.

=== Previously operated ===
- Beechcraft 200 King Air (1993 - 1994)
- Boeing 737-300QC (1995 - 1996)
- Boeing 727-200F (1996 - 2001)
- Antonov An-12 (2002 - 2005)
- Boeing 727-100C (2005 - 2007)
- Boeing 727-200F (2007 - 2008)
- Boeing 737-300F (2008 - 2016)
- Boeing 757-200PCF (2018 - 2021)
