= Free Spirit Airlines =

IATA	ICAO	Call sign
FS	FSA	Free Spirit
- Founded: 2012
- Commenced operations: 30 April 2015
- Hubs: Essendon Airport
- Fleet size: 0
- Destinations: 2
- Parent company: West Wing Aviation
- Headquarters: Essendon Fields, Victoria, Australia
- Key people: Roman Badov, Founder
- Website: freespiritairlines.com.au

Free Spirit Airlines is a Melbourne-based airline that was founded in 2012 and commenced operations on 30 April 2015. The company is headquartered in Essendon Fields, Melbourne, Australia.

== History ==
Free Spirit Airlines was first established in 2012 to provide economical alternatives for travelling. Later in October 2014, planning for a service from Essendon to Burnie was established. The airline gained its first aircraft, a Beechcraft 1900, from West Wing Aviation in March 2015 and was reported to launch later in April. On 30 April 2015, the company launched with flights from Essendon Airport, however delayed operations the next day after a competing airliner attempted to lure away employees. The airline resumed operations on 7 May 2015 with its first flight from Essendon to Burnie.

The airline once again put operations on hold late in October 2016 due to their only aircraft being returned to its leaser and being put up for sale. It was announced on 23 November 2016 that the airline is upgrading aircraft and services are set to resume on 1 December. The airline has received 1 aircraft which is Sharp Airlines Metro 23 VH-SEZ painted in basic Free Spirit Colours, it's unclear if they'll actually receive any other aircraft.

On 1 May 2017 the airline announced it has pulled out of its Burnie to Essendon route due to what the company says 'high landing' fees at Burnie airport. The airline also said they plan to expand their Victorian operations and also start operating in New South Wales 'sooner rather than later. It's unclear what routes they will start in NSW, possibly Merimbula/Sydney as mentioned in November 2016.

As of 19 January 2018 the partnership with Sharp Airlines ceased which meant its services are no longer operated by 19 seat aircraft. The airlines services are now being operated by Australasian Jet Pty Ltd with a mix of aircraft types from Beechcraft Super King Air, Cessna 402 and Cessna 441 Conquest II.

On 5 February 2018 Essendon fields airport issued a statement regarding the disruption of services between Merimbula and Essendon. The airport has issued FSA with a notice to vacate commencing 5 March 2018. The airport has not said why they have done this. They were going to have the services conducted from Moorabbin using charter substitute Piper Chieftains by an unknown operator but the company has been wound up.

== Destinations ==
The airline currently operates flights from its main hub at Essendon Airport, Melbourne to Merimbula Airport in New South Wales. The airline previously served Burnie before dropping the route on 1 May. Free spirit plans to expand Victorian operations and also start services in New South Wales sooner rather than later.

== Fleet ==
As of October 2016 Free Spirit Airlines has 0 aircraft in their fleet. However, since their only aircraft VH-EMK a Beechcraft 1900 was returned to its leaser in Western Australia, their routes have been operated by other operators on behalf of Free Spirit. These operators include: Sharp Airlines Metro 23, GAM (General Aviation Maintenance) Dornier 228 and most recently and commonly Vortex Air's Piper Navajo VH-TWU. On 23 November 2016 it was announced the airline is upgrading from their Beechcraft 1900 to two new aircraft. Since operations resumed on 1 December the airline has got Sharp Airlines Metro III VH-SEZ operating the routes, the aircraft is in basic Free Spirit colours, they're using other Sharp Airlines Metro 23 Aircraft as backups. As of 19 January 2018 the airline has no aircraft, the leased metro aircraft are no longer operating the services. The airline then started using Australasian Jet Pty Ltd aircraft which consist of mixed aircraft types. These include Beechcraft Super King Air, Cessna 402 and Cessna 441 Conquest II before ceasing operations in February 2018.

Aircraft	Total	Notes

== See also ==
- List of airlines of Australia
