= QJE =

QJE may refer to:

- Quarterly Journal of Economics, a peer-reviewed academic journal for the Harvard University Department of Economics
- QJE, the ICAO code for National Jet Systems, Australia
