= The Godless Girl =

1928 film

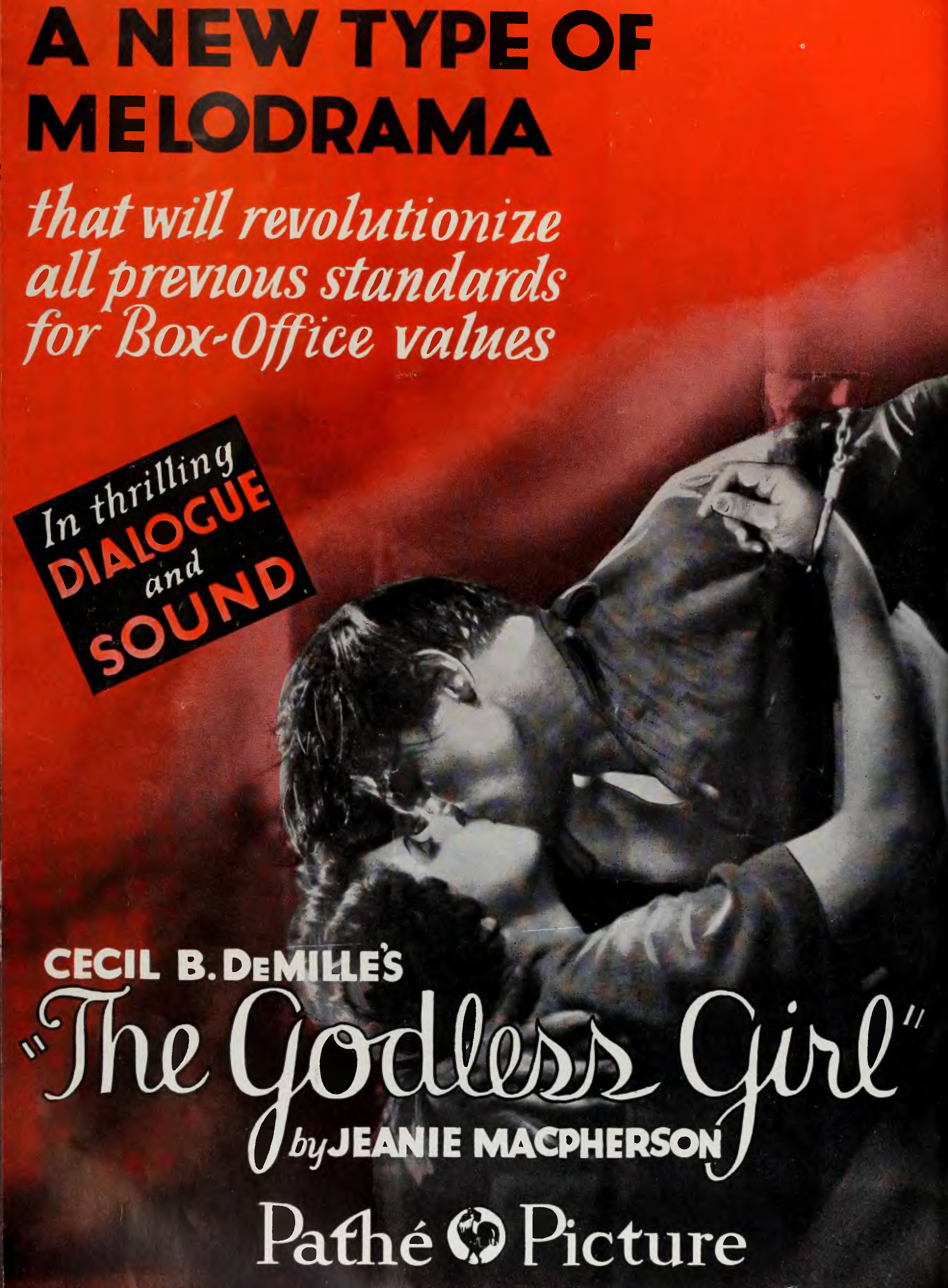
- Advertisement of the film from 1929
- Directed by: Cecil B. DeMille
- Written by: Beulah Marie Dix; Jeanie MacPherson
- Produced by: Cecil B. DeMille
- Starring: Lina Basquette; Marie Prevost; Tom Keene; Noah Beery Sr.
- Cinematography: J. Peverell Marley
- Edited by: Anne Bauchens
- Distributed by: Pathé Exchange
- Release dates: August 1928 (silent version); March 31, 1929 (sound version)
- Running time: 113 minutes
- Country: United States
- Languages: Sound (part-talkie); English intertitles
- Budget: $722,315.17
- Box office: $489,095.49

The Godless Girl (1928) by Cecil B. DeMille. Silent, as the soundtrack is not original.

The Godless Girl is a 1928 American sound part-talkie drama directed by Cecil B. DeMille. In addition to sequences with audible dialogue or talking sequences, the film features a synchronized musical score and sound effects along with English intertitles. The soundtrack was recorded using the RCA Photophone sound-on-film system. The cast features Lina Basquette, Marie Prevost, Tom Keene, and Noah Beery.

The film's plot initially depicts violent actions by Christians against the members of an atheist school club. Three of the atheists are convicted of manslaughter when a girl is accidentally killed during a fight with Christians. The story follows the fate of the prisoners in a brutal juvenile reformatory.

== Plot ==
Judy Craig, a young atheist, forms a high school club called The Godless Society and prints pamphlets to recruit new members. Bob Hathaway, the student body president and a devout Christian, leads a mob who break into the school to interrupt the meeting. During one meeting, Judy attempts to swear in one member named Bozo. Bob enters the meeting and orders the attendees to leave, but when they refuse, a fight breaks out. As the police are called, a young girl falls to her death when the staircase railing collapses.

Judy, Bob, and Bozo are charged with manslaughter and thrown into a brutal juvenile reformatory. There, the boys and girls are held in their quarters, which is separated by a barbed wire fence. In her quarters, Judy befriends another young girl named Mame. One day, outside, Bob converses with Judy near the fence. As they hold each other's hands within the fence, a prison guard turns on a switch, which shocks both Bob and Judy. Angered, Bob fights the guard and he is sent to solitary confinement. After several days, Bozo tries to feed Bob bread and water, but the guard prevents this.

When the guard returns, Bob fights him and locks him inside the cell and runs away. Meanwhile, Judy and Mame are working in a meat house under a matron's supervision. Bob rides a horse-drawn wagon outside the meat house. Mame distracts the matron when she breaks a shipping case of eggs, while Judy hides underneath a cloth as Bob rides off. Eventually, the guard is freed and launches a pursuit for Bob and Judy. To evade the authorities, they hide under a bridge.

Bob and Judy take shelter at a farm and fall in love, while the guard uses search dogs along the river banks to find them. The next day, the guard finds Bob inside the farm and uses a pitchfork to draw Judy from hiding. Bob and Judy are sent to solitary confinement where they are handcuffed to a pole. At nighttime, a stray cat knocks over an oil lamp into a laundry basket, which ignites a fire. Joyful at the prospect of their freedom, the girls throw a riot. Mame, seeing that Judy is still locked in solitary, tracks down the keys but the girls wrestle the keys out of her hands, thus freeing themselves.

Bob is freed from solitary, and concerned for Judy's safety, he pleads with the guard to rescue her from the fire. As the fire is being hosed down, Bob and the guard rush into the quarters to save Judy. As they approach the electric gate, the guard is badly burnt until Bob turns the switch off. Using the guard's keys, Bob frees Judy. As they attempt to leave, the guard, trapped under burning debris, cries out for help. Judy pleads with Bob to save him, and they rescue him.

After some time, Bozo and Mame seem to end up together, while Bob and Judy with their rekindled faith ride off together as they leave the reformatory.

== Cast ==
- Lina Basquette as Judy Craig, The Girl
- Marie Prevost as Mame, The Other Girl
- Tom Keene as Bob Hathaway, The Boy (credited as George Duryea)
- Noah Beery as The Brute
- Eddie Quillan as Samuel 'Bozo' Johnson, The Goat
- Mary Jane Irving as The Victim
- Hedwiga Reicher as Prison Matron (credited as Hedwig Reicher)
- Clarence Burton as Prison Guard
- Richard Alexander as Prison Guard (credited as Dick Alexander)
- Kate Priceas Prison Matron
- Julia Faye as Inmate
- Viola Louie as Inmate
- Emily Barrye as Inmate
- Robert Young as "student" (uncredited)

== Production ==
=== Background ===
After his success with King of Kings, DeMille considered the story of T.E. Lawrence but the cost of the film rights was prohibitive, and he considered making a film about contemporary social issues. By 1927, the system of reform schools was established around the US, and reports of abuse had begun to circulate, prompting DeMille to arrange for researchers to investigate, resulting in affidavits and letters recounting stories of water torture, restraint with chains, ropes, and straitjackets, corporal punishment, solitary confinement, as well as the use of bloodhounds and electric fences to deter escape.

Around the same time, news broke about an atheist organization actively scouting for recruits at Hollywood High School, where a student named Queen Selections Silver started an atheist society. She was a child prodigy and socialist orator, accused of leaving atheist pamphlets in student lockers at Hollywood High School in 1927. Jeanie Macpherson combined the themes of abusive juvenile reform, militant atheism and fundamentalist Christian zealotry into one story.

=== Casting ===
Lina Basquette had been a featured dancer in the Ziegfeld Follies and was briefly married to Sam Warner before his untimely death. Basquette's autobiography is titled: Lina: DeMille's Godless Girl.

Marie Prevost was a Canadian who began her film career as one of Mack Sennett's Bathing Beauties in 1915, when she was seventeen years old. Her comedic talent earned her star billing in Sennett's Keystone Cops short films, followed by a contract with Universal Pictures in 1921, where she was regularly typecast as a free spirit. By 1927, she had become an alcoholic and her marriage to Kenneth Harlan had fallen apart.

== Music ==
Actor Fritz Feld filmed the sound sequences without DeMille's supervision, since DeMille had already broken his contract with Pathé and signed with Metro-Goldwyn-Mayer.

The film features a theme song "Love (All I Want Is Love)", composed by Josiah Zuro and Charles Weinberg. It is sung and played several times on the soundtrack.

== Release ==
The film premiered in Los Angeles on August 20, 1928.

The UCLA Film and Television Archive restored the film's sound version, in which dialogue scenes were added to the final reel, a film that was one of DeMille's first part-sound efforts.

In 2007, a version was released by Photoplay Productions and George Eastman House, in association with the Cecil B. DeMille Foundation and Film4, with the picture portion restored from deMille's own nitrate print. Unfortunately, a modern score which bore no resemblance to the original score was used on the DVD. The film has yet to be released with its soundtrack in the form that most audiences originally saw the film in 1929. Kino Lorber announced a release of the restored film on Blu-ray for January 13, 2026.

== Reception ==
A critic for The New York Times panned the film: "The story, which stretches from ludicrous slapstick through scenes in a burning reformatory, the intensity in feeling of which equals motion-picture depictions of the French Revolution, is punctured with vapid religious admonitions and strange heavenly warnings in the form of crosses burnt into the palms of the heroine."

In his autobiography, DeMille recounts a 1931 visit to the Soviet Union, where The Godless Girl was a hit. The reason why his film proved so successful in a country devoted to Communism and atheism mystified him until he found out that it was shown incomplete: "The Russians simply did not screen the redeeming reel, but played the rest of the picture as a document of American police brutality and the glorious spreading of atheism among American youth."

== See also ==
- List of early sound feature films (1926–1929)
