= Barrow Airport =

Barrow Airport may refer to:

- Barrow/Walney Island Airport in Barrow-in-Furness, England, United Kingdom
- Wiley Post–Will Rogers Memorial Airport in Utqiaġvik (formerly known as Barrow), Alaska, United States
- Barrow Island Airport in Western Australia
