= StarTrack =

Australian logistics and package delivery company

- Formerly: Multigroup Distribution Services (1974–1982); Discount Freight Express (1982–2000); Star Track Express (2000–2012)
- Industry: Logistics
- Founded: 1974; 52 years ago
- Founder: Greg Poche
- Headquarters: Strawberry Hills, Australia
- Area served: Australia
- Parent: Australia Post
- Website: www.startrack.com.au

StarTrack is an Australian transport and logistics company owned by Australia Post.

== Founding ==
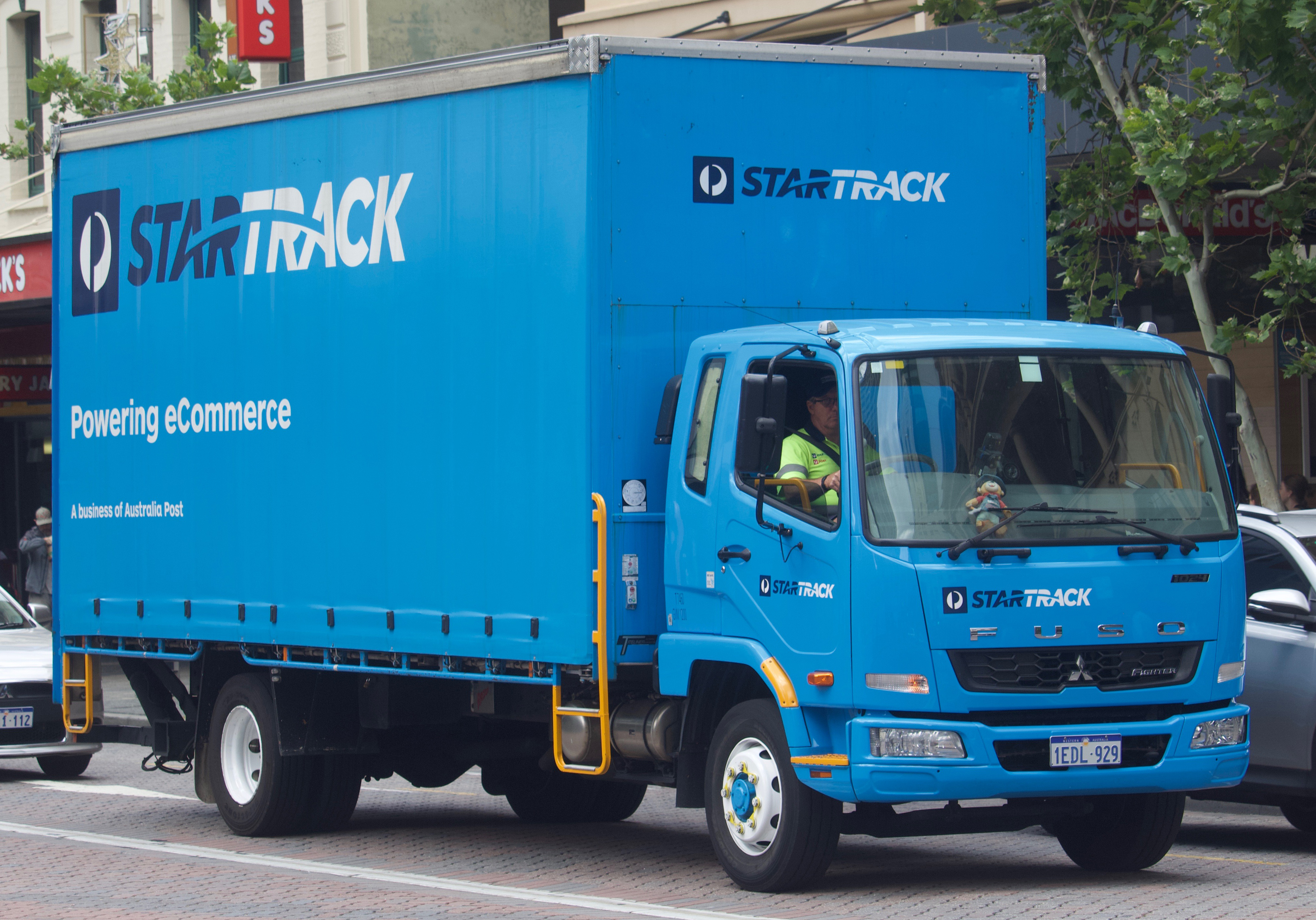
StarTrack Mitsubishi Fuso Fighter

StarTrack was founded in 1974, as Multigroup Distribution Services in Dee Why, Sydney by Greg Poche. In 1982, the name Discount Freight Express was adopted and renamed StarTrack Express in 2001. The company currently has over 55 depots and agents nationally with their head office located in Strawberry Hills. Express road freight generates around 90% of the company's revenue.

In December 2003, the business was sold to Australia Post and Qantas. In May 2011, the retail division of Australian airExpress merged with StarTrack.

== Australia Post acquisition ==
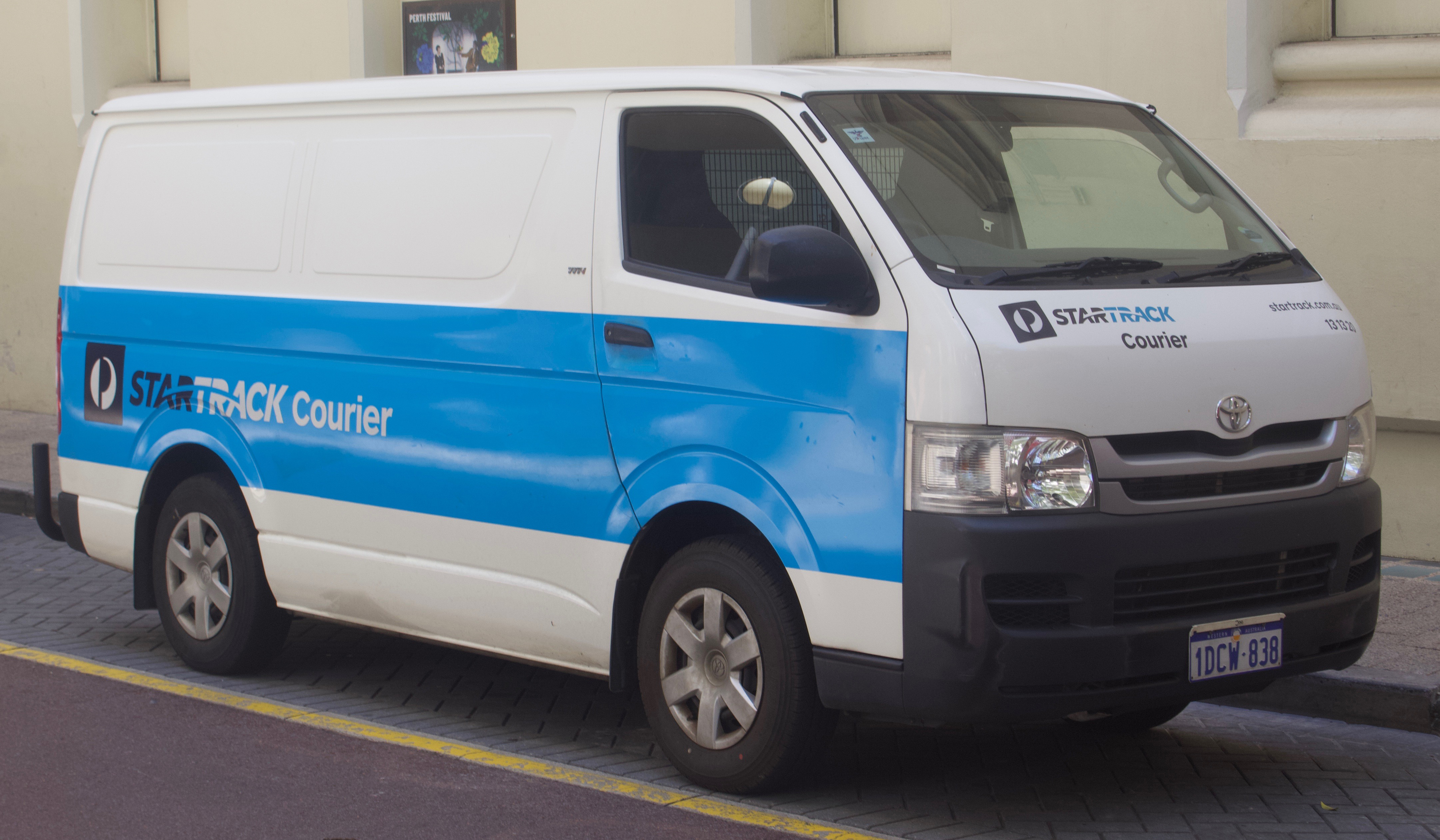
StarTrack Toyota HiAce

In November 2012, Australia Post bought the 50% of the company owned by Qantas. As part of the deal, Australia Post divested itself of its 50% interest in Australian airExpress to Qantas.

On 7 May 2014, StarTrack was rebranded to include Australia Post post horn in the StarTrack blue colours. StarTrack also took responsibility of Australia Post's "Messenger Post couriers" under the StarTrack brand as "StarTrack Courier"

In June 2014 (former) Australia Post CEO Ahmed Fahour announced the company would be splitting into two arms, red and blue. Australia Post will continue to be represented by the traditional red logo under one arm which combines all retail and communication services. Post's StarTrack business will be represented by replica blue logo and incorporate all of Post's parcel and logistics operations.

A dedicated fleet of six aircraft is operated by Qantas Freight for Australia Post and StarTrack from July 2016.

Mail Call Couriers is now a part of Australia Post StarTrack since January 2016.
