= Free Spirit =

Free Spirit(s) or The Free Spirit(s) may refer to:

== Film and television ==
- Free Spirit (film), a 1951 Argentine drama film
- Free Spirit (TV series), a 1989–1990 American fantasy sitcom
- ”Free Spirit” (The Outer Limits), a 2001 TV episode

== Music ==
=== Performers ===
- Free Spirit (band), a Finnish hard-rock band formed in 2005
- The Free Spirits, a 1960s American jazz-rock group

=== Albums ===
- Free Spirit (Bonnie Tyler album), 1995
- Free Spirit (Imani Coppola album), 2010
- Free Spirit (Khalid album) or the title song, 2019
- Free Spirits (Mary Lou Williams album) or the title song, 1976
- Free Spirits (Ca7riel & Paco Amoroso album), 2026
- Free Spirit, by Hudson Ford, 1974
- Free Spirit, by Ken Hensley, 1980
- Free Spirit, by Kollegah, or the title song, 2022
- Free Spirit, by Paul Rodgers, 2018
- Free Spirit, by Sonny Black, 1998
- Free Spirit, by Ted Brown, 1989
- Free Spirit, by Terry Burrus, 1991

=== Songs ===
- "Free Spirit" (Hermon Hitson song), 1966
- "Free Spirit" (Jedward song), 2014
- "Free Spirit", by Birtha, 1972
- "Free Spirit", by Crispian St. Peters, 1967
- "Free Spirit", by Dennis Coffey, 1977
- "Free Spirit", by Drake from Care Package, 2019
- "Free Spirit", by Kim Appleby, 1994

== Organizations ==
- Free Spirit Airlines, an Australian airline
- Free Spirit Alliance, a non-profit organization serving the Pagan and pantheist communities
- Free Spirit Media, an American non-profit film and media organization
- Free Spirit Records, a British record label founded by Sonny Black

== Other uses ==
- Free Spirit (comics), a Marvel Universe character
- Free Spirit, the frequent flyer program of Spirit Airlines
- "The Free Spirit", part two of Friedrich Nietzsche's Beyond Good and Evil
- Brethren of the Free Spirit, a medieval heretical movement
- CEI Free Spirit Mk II, an American homebuilt aircraft design

== See also ==
- Freethought, a philosophical viewpoint
