= Surveillance Australia =

Australian aviation company

IATA	ICAO	Call sign
-	BDF	BORDER FORCE
- Founded: 1994
- Operating bases: Broome International Airport; Cairns Airport; Darwin International Airport
- Fleet size: 10
- Parent company: Leidos Holdings Inc.
- Headquarters: Adelaide Airport, South Australia
- Website: Leidos Australia

Surveillance Australia Pty Ltd (formerly Cobham Aviation Services Australia - Special Mission) is an Australian aviation company. It is primarily engaged in servicing the Australian Border Force Coastwatch contract, flying surveillance patrols within the Australian Exclusive Economic Zone (AEEZ).

== History ==
Surveillance Australia was established in 1994 by National Jet Systems as a subsidiary to operate fixed-wing aerial surveillance aircraft and patrols on behalf of the Australian Customs Service Coastwatch operations.

In 1999, National Jet Systems and its subsidiaries including Surveillance Australia, were acquired by Cobham plc for £24.5 million.

In 2006, Surveillance Australia was awarded the A$1 billion Coastwatch contract that will see its aircraft operating through to 2020. This contract saw operations be restricted to only 10 de Havilland Canada Dash 8 aircraft, retiring the previously mixed fleet including the Reims F406 Caravan II. This contract was due to be succeeded by the 2018 announcement by the Australian Government for the Future Maritime Surveillance Capability (FMSC), followed by an RFI release in October 2018.

In 2009, Surveillance Australia was rebranded to Cobham Aviation Services Australia - Special Mission to align its branding with the broader Cobham group.

At the end of 2021, with the existing contract close to expiring, the Department of Home Affairs approved a contract variation to extend it by 6 years to 31 December 2027.

In October 2022, Surveillance Australia was acquired by the American government services contractor Leidos, and will be operated locally by Leidos Australia.

In May 2026, the Australian Border Force confirmed that its Civil Maritime Surveillance Contract, held by Leidos Australia, would not be renewed, with the Department of Home Affairs instead engaging Metrea Australia Pty Ltd to provide the service from 1 January 2028. Leidos is expected to continue operating the contract until the handover, with transition arrangements in place to manage continuity of aerial surveillance operations.

== Operations ==
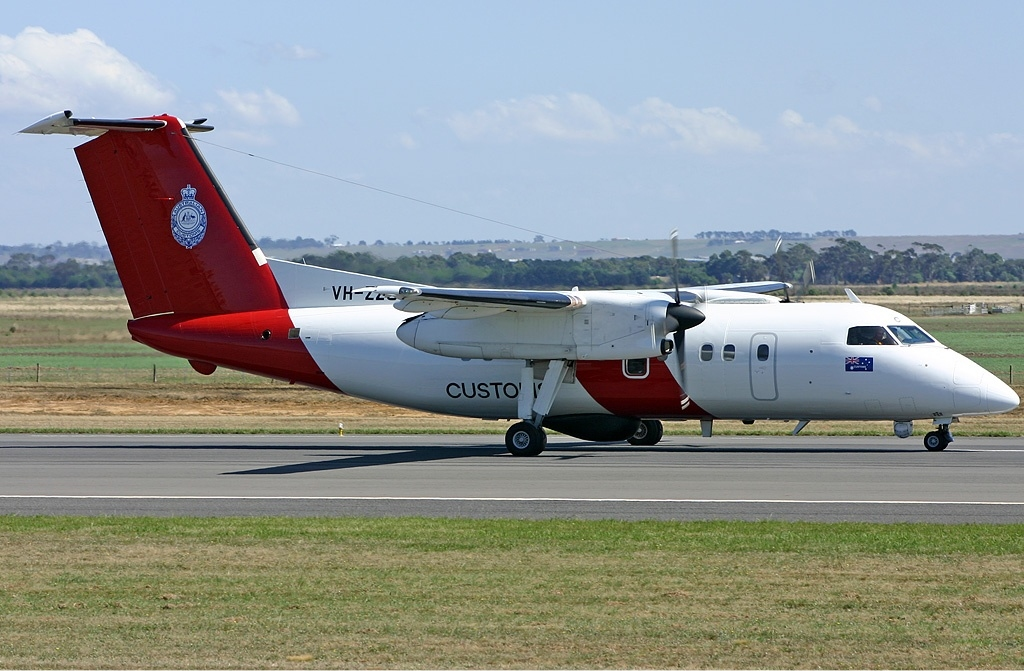
Surveillance Australia, Australian Border Force Dash 8 (2005).

Surveillance Australia aircraft conduct over 14,000 hours a year of aerial surveillance in the AEEZ, searching for illegal fishing vessels, human traffickers, drug importation, immigration and quarantine breaches, and can assist in search and rescue operations.

Surveillance Australia has played major roles in several border protection operations, directly contributing to over 200 foreign fishing vessels being apprehended and destroyed for illegally fishing for shark fin, reef fish and dolphins in Australian waters each year.

It also formerly supported operations of a single airborne laser depth sounder (LADS) aircraft for the Royal Australian Navy, as a service via the aircraft owner, Fugro.

== Fleet and bases ==
Headquartered in Adelaide, the company has three operational bases in Cairns, Darwin and Broome. It operates a fleet of six DHC-8-202 and four larger DHC-8-315 'Dash 8s' modified for maritime patrol and surveillance. One further Dash 8 was formerly configured for the LADS contract. This aircraft was de-configured and stored at Adelaide Airport until its eventual sale to US-based Berry Aviation in 2023.

The surveillance aircraft are equipped with Raytheon SeaVue surface search radars with additional Inverse synthetic aperture radar (ISAR), Synthetic aperture radar (SAR) and Moving target indication (MTI) capability, advanced electro-optical sensors and sophisticated communications suites. They can operate day and night close to land below lowest safe altitude. These aircraft can search an area of 110,000 km^{2} per flight.

The Mission Management System (MMS) developed by Adelaide-based Acacia Systems integrates various onboard surveillance systems and provides real time communications between aircrew and Maritime Border Command headquarters in Canberra. The same system is used on AMSA Search and Rescue aircraft, which are also operated by Leidos Australia.

=== Fleet ===
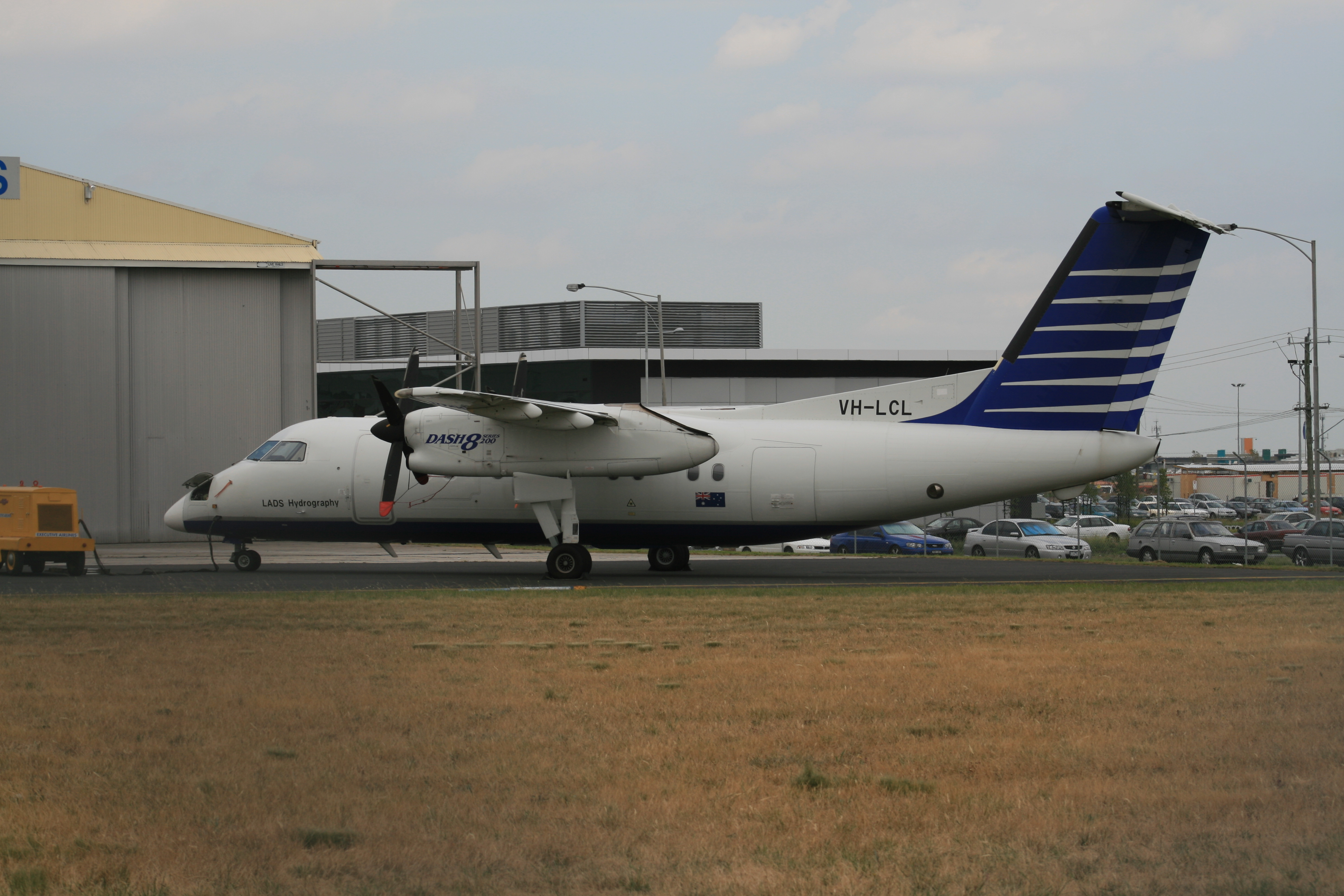
Surveillance Australia operate this LADS-equipped de Havilland Canada Dash 8, VH-LCL.

Surveillance Australia fleet currently operates 10 aircraft:

- 2 Bombardier DHC-8-202 Dash 8 (as of August 2019)
- 4 de Havilland Canada DHC-8-202 Dash 8 (as of August 2019)
- 3 Bombardier DHC-8-315 Dash 8 (as of August 2019)
- 1 de Havilland Canada DHC-8-315 Dash 8 (as of August 2019)

== See also ==
- Australian Border Force
- Australian Coastwatch
- Border Protection Command
- LADS
- Leidos
- Maritime Border Command
