= Coastwatch =

De facto former coast guard of Australia

The Australian Coastal Surveillance Organisation, also known as Coastwatch, was an operational division of the Australian Customs Service and the de facto Australian coast guard service. The former Coastwatch Division is now part of the Australian Border Force Maritime Border Command, a joint civil/military organisation responsible for civil maritime security.

Border Protection Command Dash 8 aircraft are referred to by their civil call sign "Border Force XX" and are operated by Cobham Aviation Services on behalf of the Australian Border Force. These aircraft carry out civil maritime surveillance service to help protect Australia's borders. The fleet of specialised fixed-wing patrol aircraft and helicopters undertake electronic and visual surveillance of Australia's coastline and offshore maritime areas.

== See also ==
- Surveillance Australia
- Border Protection Command
- Australian Customs Service
- Coastwatch Oz
- Tampa affair
