= West Wing Aviation =

Australian airline

West Wing Aviation Pty Ltd
IATA	ICAO	Call sign
-	-	-
- Founded: 2000; 26 years ago
- Commenced operations: 2 May 2000
- Hubs: Townsville Airport; Cairns Airport
- Parent company: Collings Aircraft Holdings
- Headquarters: Townsville, Queensland, Australia
- Key people: Peter Collings, founder and CEO
- Website: skytrans.com.au

West Wing Aviation is an airline based in Townsville, Queensland that was founded in 2000 and commenced operations on 2 May 2000.

== History ==
The founder and CEO of the company, Peter Collings, owned various airline operations running in Queensland dating back to 1992. After the company grew, he decided to move away from the company to start West Wing Aviation in 2000, which would provide small commute flights from the Queensland area.

In 2015, another Queensland based airline, Skytrans Airlines, shut down on 2 January 2015. A few days later, West Wing Aviation was requested to temporarily continue the Cape York flights in order to prevent the isolation of remote towns. On 23 March 2015, a deal was made that Skytrans would be purchased under the West Wing Aviation brand and would be resurrected. It was announced that flights for Skytrans would resume on 1 April 2015 under a new brand, recovering some of its previous staff and leasing two Bombardier Dash 8 aircraft.

== Destinations ==
All West Wing Aviation flights throughout the Torres Strait and Cape York regions are now operated by sister company Skytrans Airlines.

== Fleet ==
The West Wing Aviation current fleet consists of:

West Wing Aviation fleet
Aircraft	Total
Beechcraft Super King Air B200	2
Beechcraft Baron	4
Cessna 182 Skylane	1
Cessna 402	2
Cessna 404 Titan	2

== See also ==
- List of airlines of Australia
