= Express Freighters Australia =

Australian cargo airline based in Sydney

IATA	ICAO	Call sign
QE	EFA	QANTAS
- Founded: August 2006; 19 years ago
- Commenced operations: 24 October 2006; 19 years ago
- AOC #: CASA.AOC.0002
- Fleet size: 8
- Parent company: Qantas Freight
- Headquarters: Sydney, New South Wales, Australia

Express Freighters Australia is a cargo airline based in Sydney, New South Wales, Australia. It was established in August 2006 and is wholly owned by Qantas Freight, a subsidiary of Qantas.

== History ==
Express Freighters Australia commenced operations on 24 October 2006, initially operating one Boeing 737-300 on a wet lease from Australian airExpress. and expanded to four aircraft during 2007.

The four 737s supplanted Boeing 727-200s previously operated on behalf of Australian airExpress (itself a joint venture between Qantas Freight and Australia Post) by National Jet Systems.

== Fleet ==
=== Current fleet ===
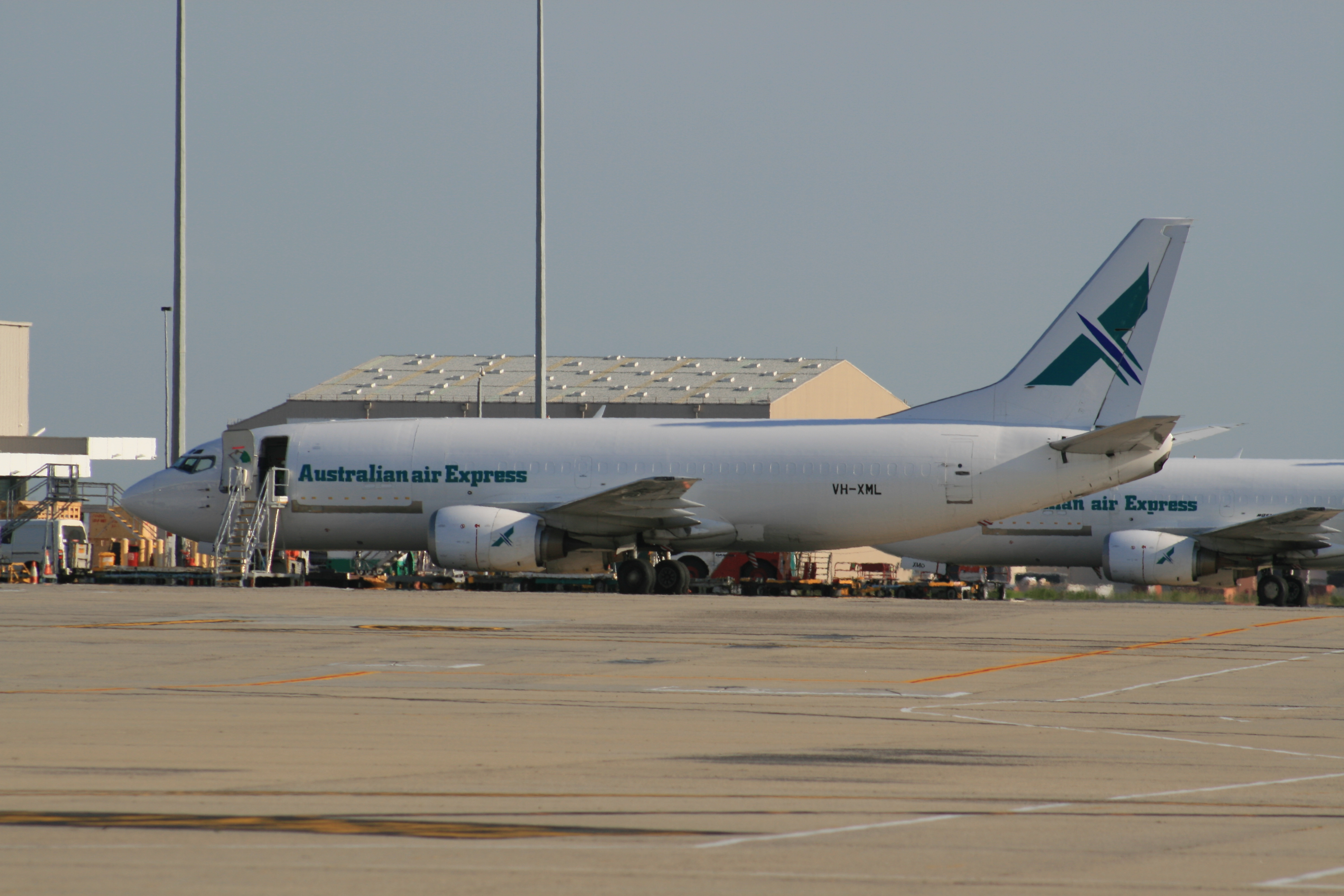
Express Freighters Australia Boeing 737-300 at Melbourne Airport in 2007

As of August 2025, Express Freighters Australia operates the following aircraft:

- 6 Airbus A321P2F
- 2 Airbus A330P2F

=== Former fleet ===
Express Freighters Australia previously operated the following aircraft:

- 1 Boeing 737-400F

Three 737-300 aircraft were formerly part of the Qantas passenger-carrying fleet and are still owned by Qantas. Express Freighters Australia also formally operated a Boeing 767-300F and currently operates a pair of Airbus A330P2F on behalf of its parent company Qantas Freight. All five Airbus A321P2Fs have been delivered to Express Freight Australia and are in service flying around Australia to major airports like Sydney, Melbourne, Brisbane, Hobart and Perth.
