= Barrow Island Airport =

Airport in Western Australia

- IATA: BWB; ICAO: YBWX

Summary
- Airport type: Private
- Owner: Chevron Australia
- Operator: Aerodrome Management Services
- Location: Barrow Island, Western Australia
- Elevation AMSL: 26 ft / 8 m
- Coordinates: 20°51′57″S 115°24′17″E

Map
- Location in Western Australia

Runways
Direction	Length		Surface
Direction	m	ft	Surface
03/21	1,900	6,234	Asphalt
- Sources: Australian AIP and aerodrome chart

Barrow Island Airport (IATA: BWB, ICAO: YBWX) is a private airport, located at Barrow Island, Western Australia. The only scheduled service is a fly-in fly-out private charter to Perth Airport operated by National Jet Express. Offshore Services Australia also operate Fly-in fly-out helicopter services to Wheatstone Platform and Karratha.

== Airlines and destinations ==
Airlines	Destinations
National Jet Express	Charter:^{1} Perth

Notes
^1 Fly-in fly-out (FIFO) private charter operations only.

== See also ==
- List of airports in Western Australia
- Transport in Australia § Aviation
