= RMA Gold Airways =

- Fleet size: 0
- Destinations: 0
- Website: www.goldairways.com.au

RMA Gold Airways was a proposed Australian airline that faced criticism for being labelled as "pretend." It planned to operate under the name Gold Airways, offering both passenger and cargo services from Melbourne to major Australian cities and regional centres, with future ambitions for international flights using a fleet of Airbus A320, Boeing 747 and Embraer 190s.

The airline was proposed by former employees of Ansett, with RMA standing for Reginald Miles Ansett, the founder of Ansett. Despite its branding as an airline, RMA Gold Airways never acquired aircraft, crew, or operational capabilities. It launched a booking platform without the infrastructure to support flights and proposed an initial public offering, coinciding with the 10th anniversary of Ansett's collapse, but these plans failed to materialise.

RMA Gold Airways Limited was listed in the Australian Business Register until its deregistration in 2014, having previously been known as Ansett Limited in 2004.
