= National Jet Systems =

Airline based in Adelaide, South Australia

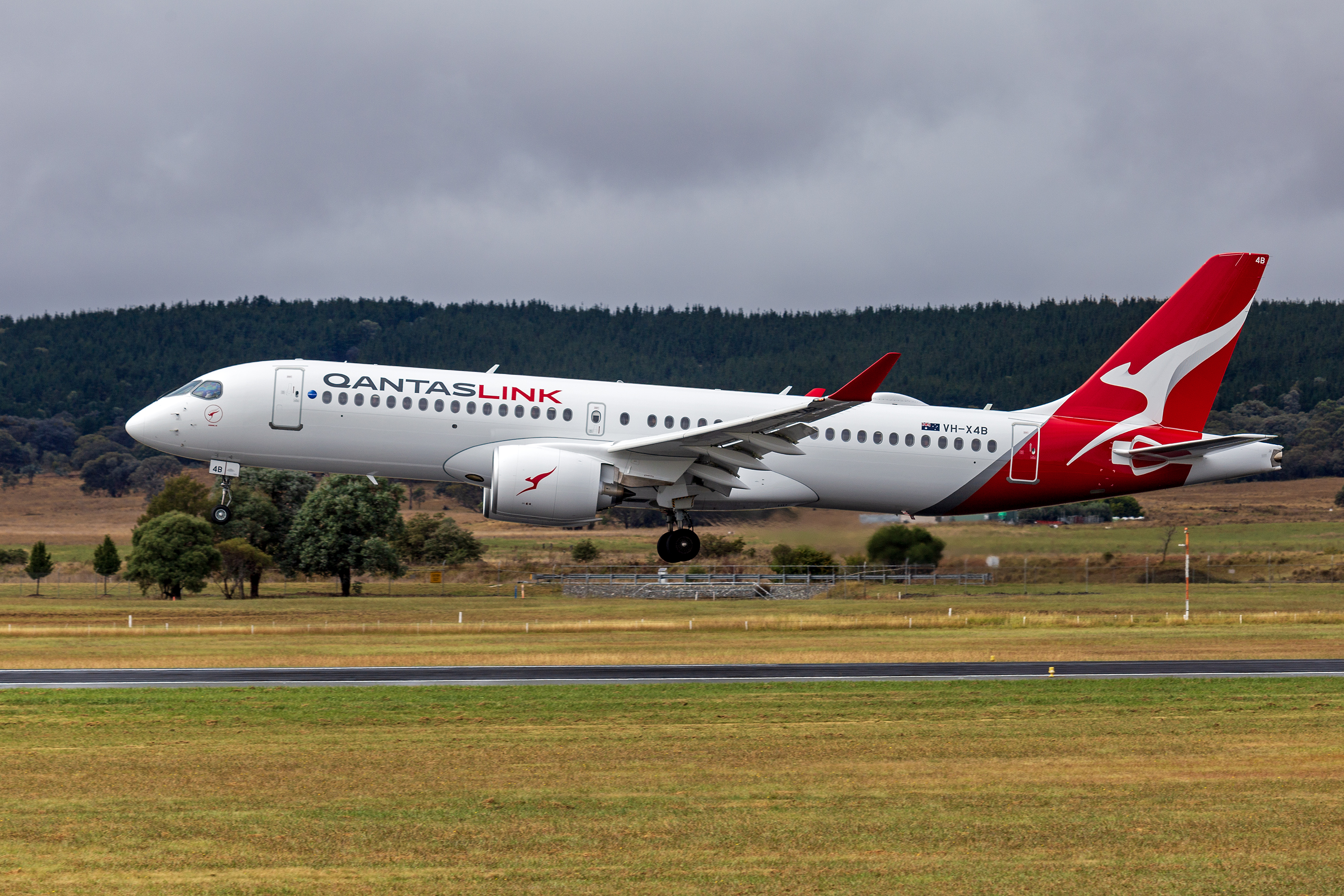
- Airbus A220 at Canberra Airport in April 2024
IATA	ICAO	Call sign
QF	QLK	Q-LINK
- Founded: 1988
- AOC #: CASA.AOC.0007
- Operating bases: Brisbane; Cairns; Melbourne; Sydney
- Frequent-flyer program: Qantas Frequent Flyer
- Alliance: Oneworld
- Fleet size: 11
- Destinations: 22
- Parent company: Qantas
- Headquarters: Adelaide, Australia

National Jet Systems is an Australian regional airline based at Adelaide Airport, operating regular scheduled services under the QantasLink brand.

== History ==
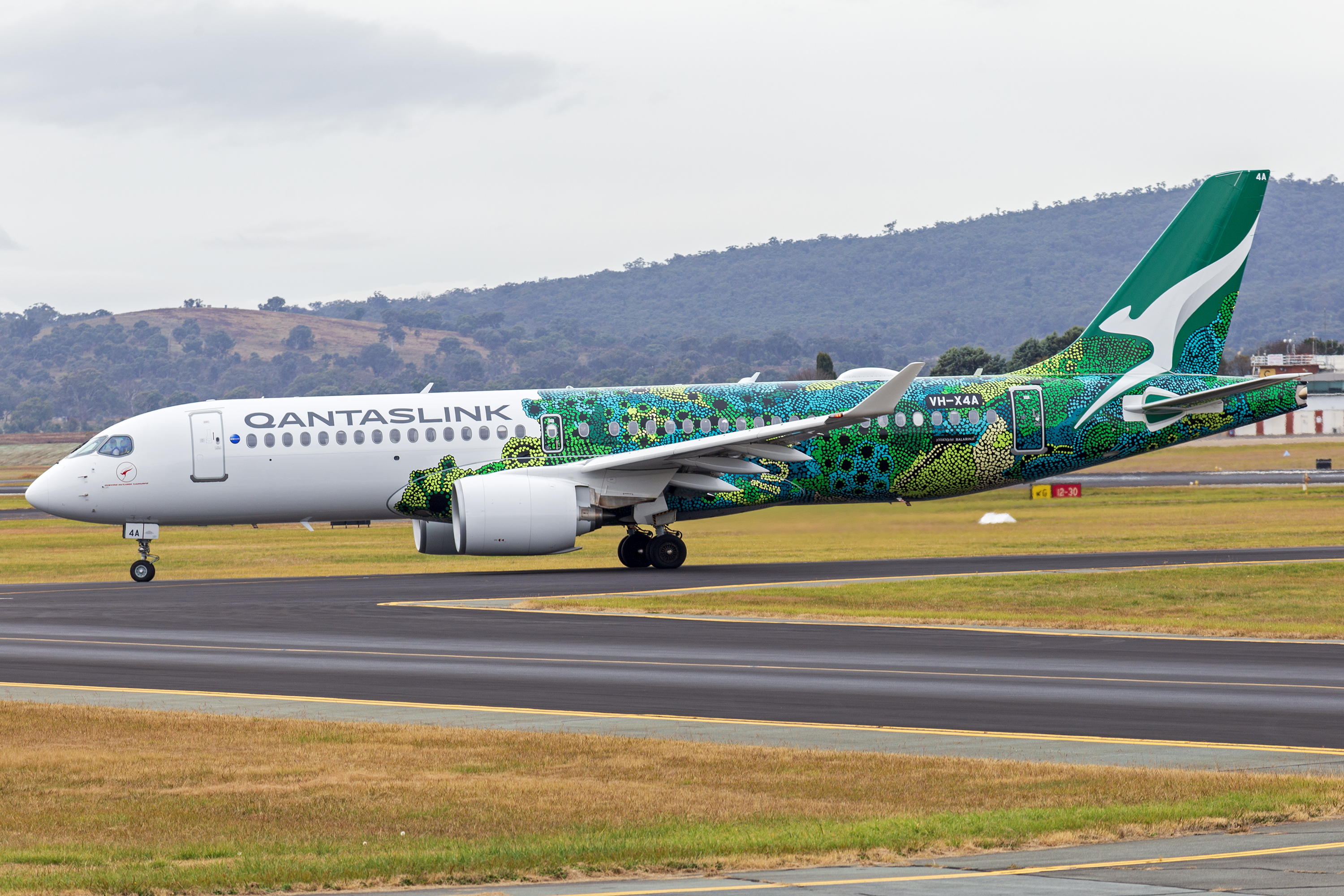
Airbus A220-300 at Canberra Airport in June 2024

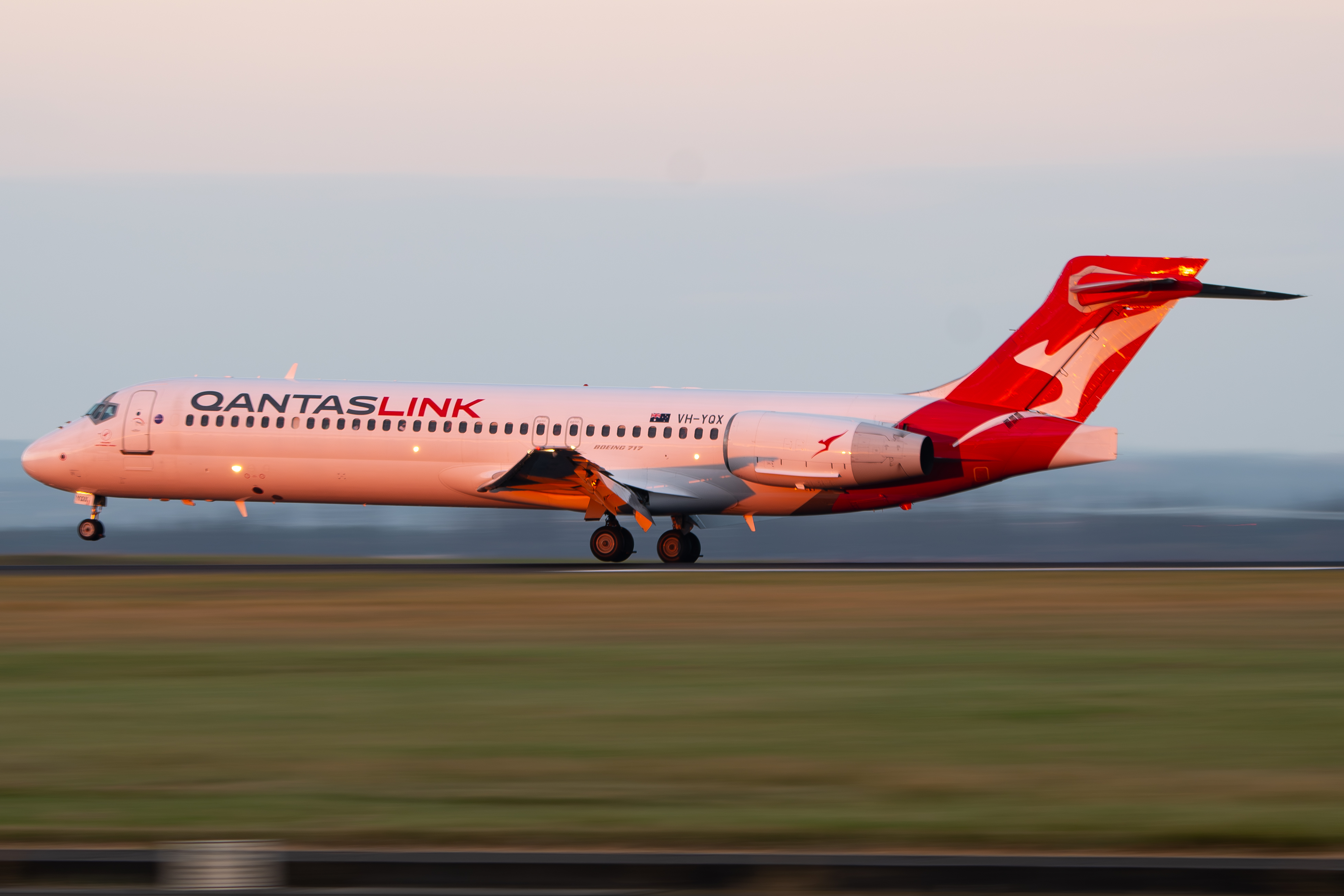
Boeing 717-200 in March 2024

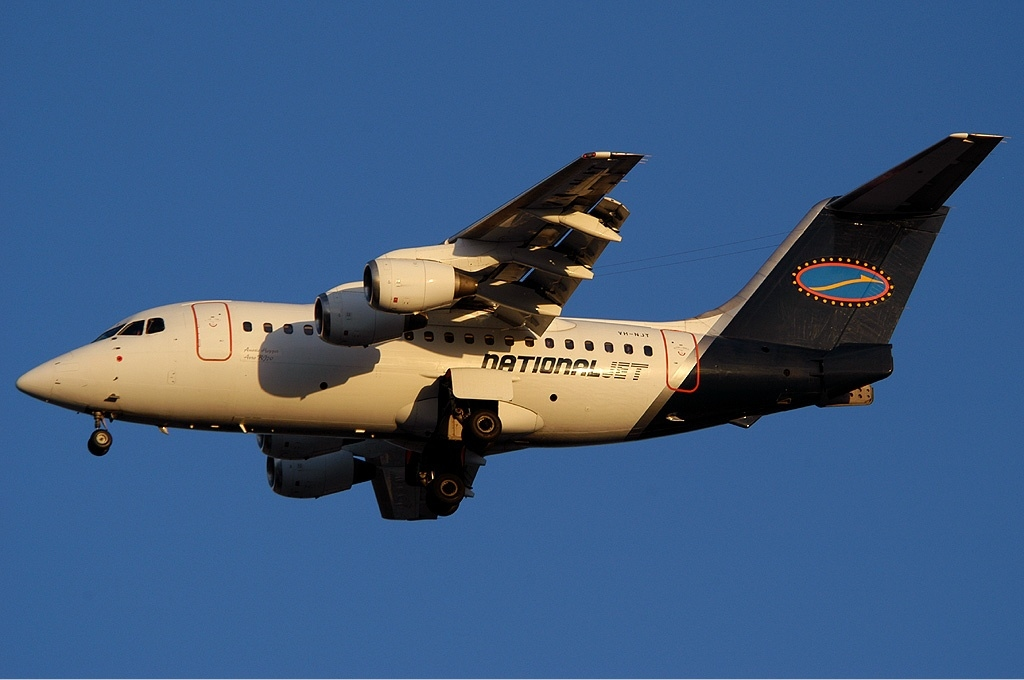
Avro RJ70 in March 2003

=== Foundation and early years ===
National Jet Systems was founded in 1988 by Warren Seymour and Rob Sherrard with operations commencing on 1 July 1990. Initial flights commenced in 1991 on behalf of Australian Airlines, mainly to tourist destinations in northern Australia, operating a fleet of four British Aerospace 146-100s under Australian’s Airlink brand.

In 1992, Australian Airlines was acquired by Qantas, and the aircraft operated by National Jet on behalf of Airlink were repainted in a modified Qantas livery. The fleet was expanded in 1993 with the addition of three leased BAe 146-200s and two chartered BAe 146-300s, which commenced operations in 1994 from Brisbane and Cairns, respectively.

In 1994, National Jet Express was established as a subsidiary to operate charter and scheduled services using National Jet's own branding, as well as freighter aircraft on behalf of Australian airExpress. Another subsidiary, Surveillance Australia, was awarded the Australian Coastwatch contract to operate fixed-wing aerial surveillance aircraft and patrols in the Australian Exclusive Economic Zone.

In 1999, National Jet Systems, including National Jet Express and Surveillance Australia, were acquired by Cobham for £24.5 million.

In 2002, Qantas launched QantasLink as a single brand for its regional airline subsidiaries and operations, and the livery on aircraft operated for QantasLink was updated to reflect the new name.

In 2005, the airline commenced operating ex Jetstar Boeing 717-200 aircraft on behalf of QantasLink in Western Australia, and transferred the remaining BAe 146 fleet to its National Jet Express subsidiary. All eight 717s formerly operated by Jetstar were transferred to National Jet Systems by October 2007.

In March 2007, the Boeing 717 operations agreement was renewed, and included an expansion of the fleet from eight to eleven aircraft. National Jet also commenced a program with Qantas and Rolls-Royce to upgrade the aircraft to the 'High Gross Weight' specification, which increased their thrust from 18,500lbs to 21,000lbs per engine, and was aimed at improving passenger-carrying performance in hot conditions.

In 2009, National Jet Systems was rebranded Cobham Aviation Services Australia - Airline Services to align its branding with the broader Cobham Group and to differentiate its role from that of National Jet Express.

=== Development since 2010 ===
In 2011, the contract for operation of Boeing 717s on behalf of QantasLink was extended until 2018. Valued at $AUD500 million, the extension also increased the size of the Boeing 717 fleet from 11 to 13 aircraft, and expanded operations into Queensland.

In 2013, an additional five Boeing 717 jets were acquired to support flights from Canberra to Brisbane, Melbourne and Sydney.

In April 2015, the company ceased performing heavy maintenance on the QantasLink Boeing 717 fleet as a result of the work moving in-house to Qantas.

In July 2016, the contract for operation of Boeing 717s on behalf of QantasLink was renewed for a further 10 years. The value of the contract was stated as being $AUD1.2 billion.

In January 2020, it was included in the takeover of Cobham by Advent International. In May 2020, Qantas purchased the National Jet Systems division, with National Jet Express and Surveillance Australia remaining under Cobham ownership. The transition to Qantas ownership was completed in July 2020. In August 2020, the bases at Cairns Airport and Perth Airport were closed.

== Destinations ==
National Jet Systems serves the following destinations on behalf of QantasLink.

- Australia
  - Australian Capital Territory
    - Canberra - Canberra Airport Hub
  - New South Wales
    - Coffs Harbour - Coffs Harbour Airport
    - Sydney - Sydney Airport Hub
  - Northern Territory
    - Darwin - Darwin International Airport
  - Queensland
    - Brisbane - Brisbane Airport Hub
    - Hamilton Island - Hamilton Island Airport
  - Victoria
    - Melbourne - Melbourne Airport Hub
  - Tasmania
    - Hobart - Hobart Airport Hub
    - Launceston - Launceston Airport
- New Zealand
  - Wellington – Wellington Airport
- Singapore
  - Singapore – Changi Airport

== Fleet ==
=== Current fleet ===
As of June 2025, the National Jet Systems fleet consists of the following aircraft:

Aircraft	In service	Orders	Notes
Airbus A220-300	11	29	Operated on behalf of QantasLink. Deliveries began in December 2023.
Total	11	29	

=== Historic fleet ===
National Jet Systems previously also operated the following aircraft:

Aircraft	Total	Introduced	Retired	Notes
Boeing 717-200	23	2005	2024	
Boeing 737-300	1	1994	1996	
British Aerospace 146-100	9	1991	2011	
British Aerospace 146-200	10	1991	2012	
British Aerospace 146-300	4	1992	2011	
British Aerospace Avro RJ70	1	1995	2010	
British Aerospace Jetstream 41	1	1998	1999	
De Havilland Canada Dash 8-100	4	1998	2009	
De Havilland Canada Dash 8-200	1	1996	2006	
De Havilland Canada Dash 8-300	2	1995	2007	
Shorts 330	1	1993	1993	

== Incidents and accidents ==
- 13 October 2010: A National Jet Systems Boeing 717-200, operating in Qantas livery, was close to stalling. The flight from Perth to Kalgoorlie had two 'stick shaker' (stall) warnings. They were caused by the pilot entering the wrong weight of the aircraft into the flight management system (FMS), and by the pilots not following correct stall recovery procedures.
- 27 May 2015: A National Jet Systems Boeing 717-200, operating from Brisbane to Gladstone in Qantas livery, was on its initial climb out of Brisbane when it suffered a 'stick shaker' (stall) warning. It was caused by the pilot retracting the flaps by mistake.
