= Australian airExpress =

Logistics company based in Melbourne, Australia

IATA	ICAO	Call sign
XM	XME	QANTAS
- Founded: 1 August 1992
- Ceased operations: 14 February 2013
- Hubs: Melbourne Airport
- Parent company: Qantas
- Headquarters: Melbourne, Australia
- Website: www.aae.com.au

Australian airExpress was a logistics company based in Melbourne, Australia. It operated freight-only services within Australia using aircraft operated by Express Freighters Australia (a subsidiary of Qantas), National Jet Systems and Pel-Air; and a fleet of land vehicles. Its main base was Melbourne Airport. Australian airExpress was absorbed into Qantas Freight in February 2013.

== History ==
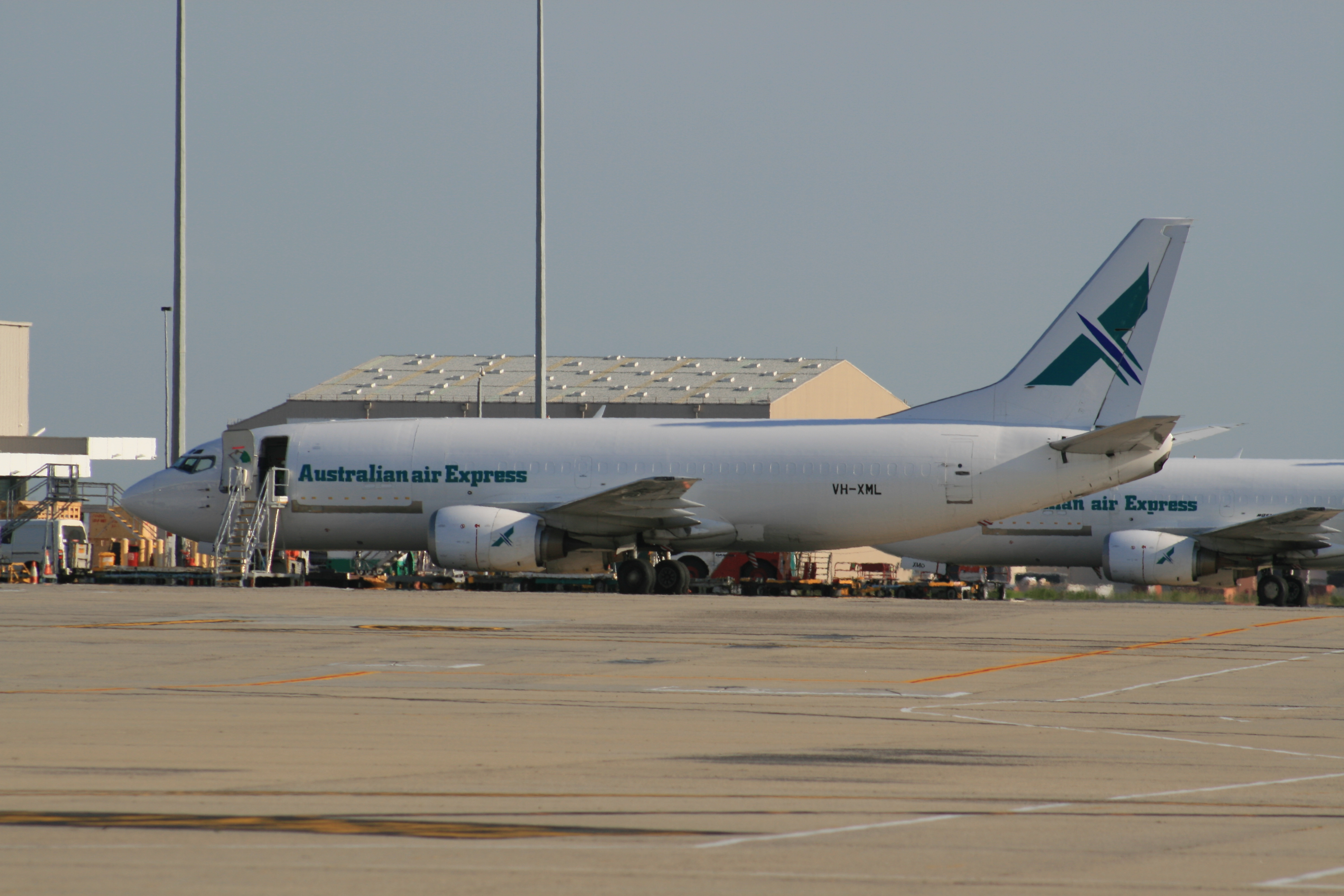
Express Freighters Australia Boeing 737s formed the core of the Australian airExpress fleet after National Jet Systems' Boeing 727s were retired

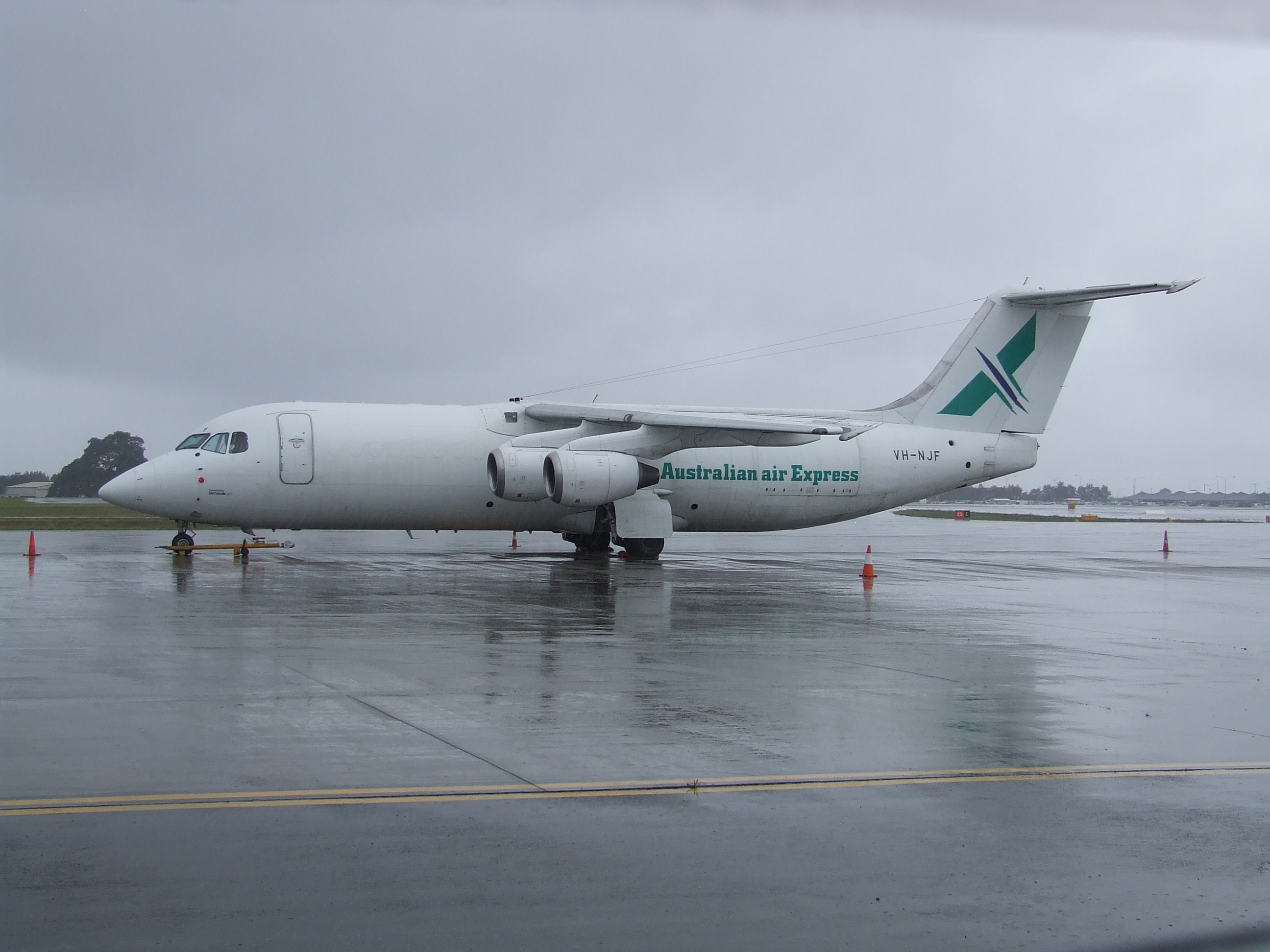
National Jet Systems British Aerospace 146 operating on behalf of Australian airExpress

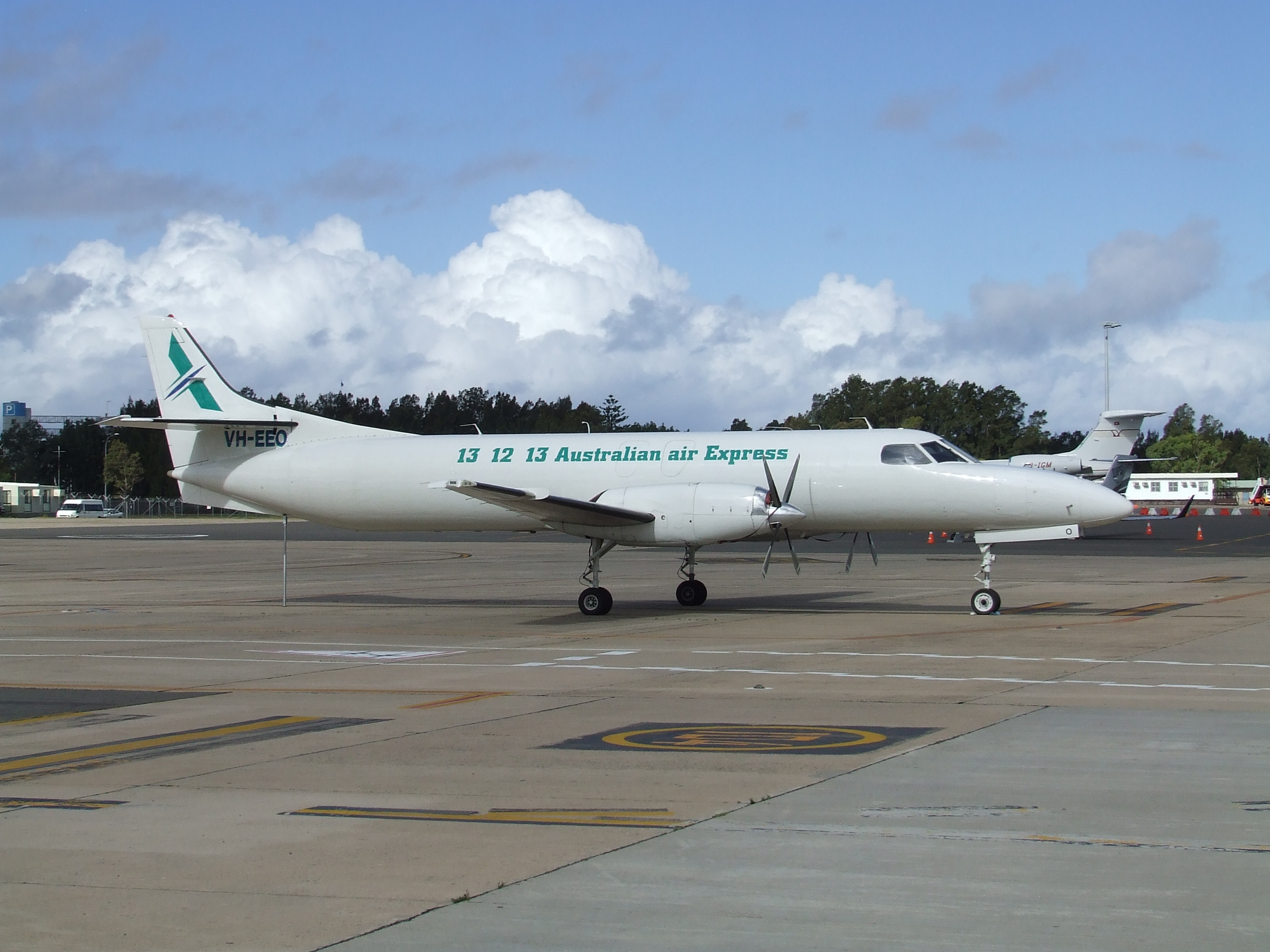
Pel-Air Fairchild Expediter operating on behalf of Australian airExpress

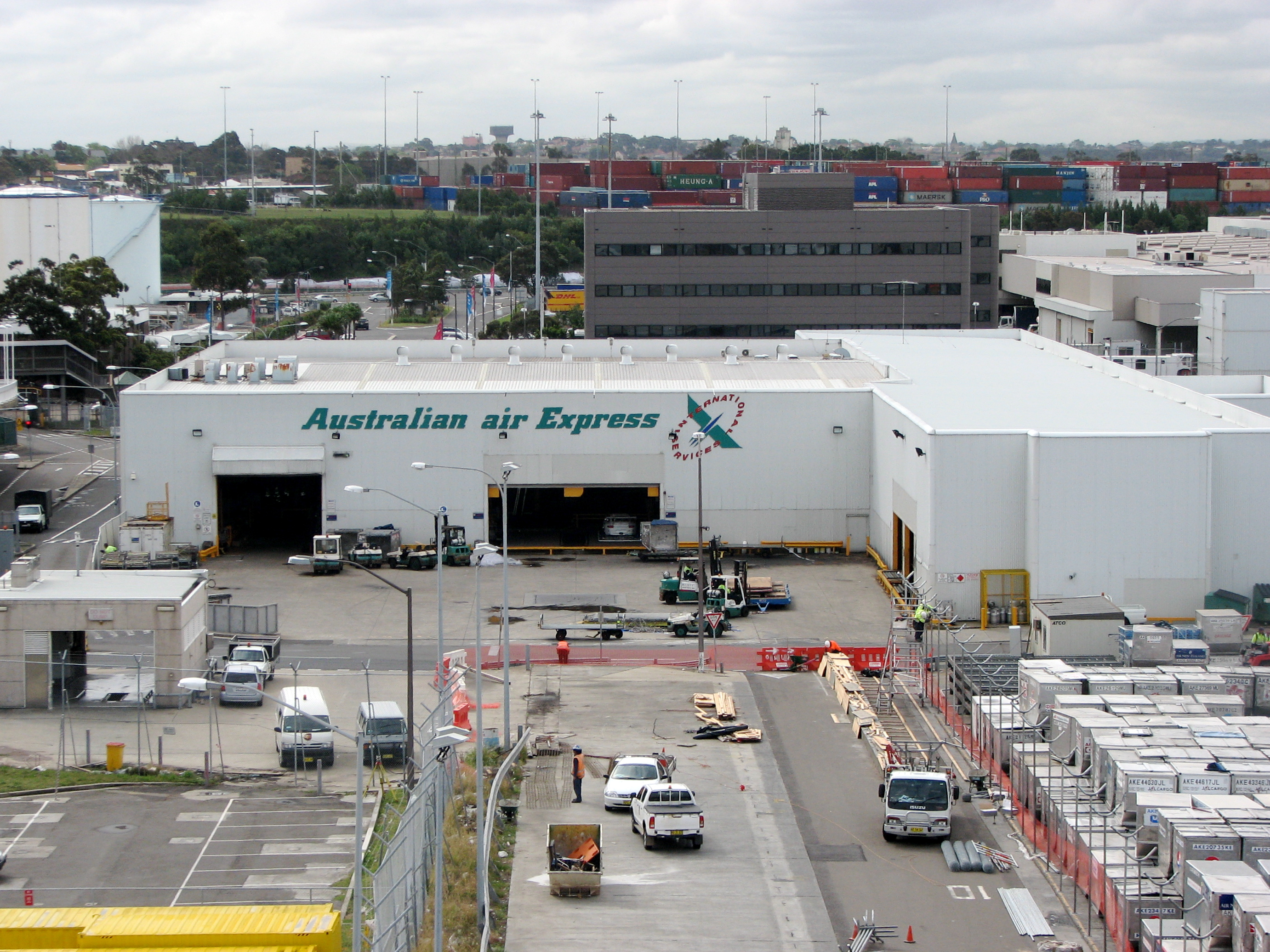
Australian airExpress International facility at Sydney Airport

Australian airExpress (AaE) was established as a domestic air freight company with the ability of pick-up and delivery services using both vans and trucks. AaE started operations on 1 August 1992. It was established as a 50:50 joint venture between Qantas and Australia Post to compete with Ansett Australia. AaE operated more than 50 nightly inter-capital freighter services. AaE used freight capacity on Qantas domestic flights and also dedicated cargo services operated on its behalf by several different companies, principally using Boeing 727 aircraft. Australian airExpress began the phasing out of the 727s in September 2006 and they were replaced by converted Boeing 737s that were formerly part of the Qantas fleet, operated by Qantas subsidiary Express Freighters Australia. The first Boeing 737 entered service on 24 October 2006. On 2 October 2012, Qantas acquired Australia Post's 50% shareholding in AaE, with Australia Post in turn acquiring Qantas's 50% stake in StarTrack.

Australian airExpress was absorbed into Qantas Freight in February 2013.

=== Operations ===
AaE flight operations were somewhat complex and varied. "Next Flight" services used space on the next available scheduled Qantas passenger flights. Items carried for Overnight, 2 Day Economy and Off-Peak deliveries were flown on both Qantas and Australian airExpress aircraft operated by Express Freighters Australia, National Jet Systems subsidiary National Jet Express, and Pel-Air. The company did not service the Northern Territory 'overnight' from Sydney. Due to the three different service providers, AaE flights operated using different flight numbers and callsigns. The Express Freighters Australia Boeing 737s used Qantas flight numbers and callsigns as the ground handling was done by Qantas/Express Freighters, while National Jet Express used the aircraft registration as their callsign and used the IATA designator XM for its flight numbers (and used the ICAO designator XME). Pel-Air flights also used XM flight numbers but had no specific callsigns. AaE also had an international Division called Australian airExpress International.

== Destinations ==
In February 2008 Australian airExpress operated freight services to the following domestic scheduled destinations:

Australian Capital Territory

- Canberra Airport

New South Wales

- Newcastle Airport
- Sydney Airport

Northern Territory

- Ayers Rock Airport
- Darwin International Airport
- Gove Airport

Queensland

- Brisbane Airport
- Cairns Airport
- Gold Coast Airport
- Mackay Airport
- Rockhampton Airport
- Townsville Airport

South Australia

- Adelaide Airport

Tasmania

- Hobart Airport
- Launceston Airport

Victoria

- Melbourne Airport (main hub)

Western Australia

- Perth Airport

== Fleet ==
The following aircraft were operating on behalf of Australian airExpress in December 2011:

Australian airExpress Fleet
Aircraft	Total	Notes
Fairchild Metro III	1	Operated by Pel-Air
Boeing 737-300F	4	Operated by Express Freighters Australia
British Aerospace 146-300QT	2	Operated by Cobham Aviation Services
British Aerospace 146-100QT	1	Operated by Cobham Aviation Services
