= Qantas Freight =

Cargo airline of Australia

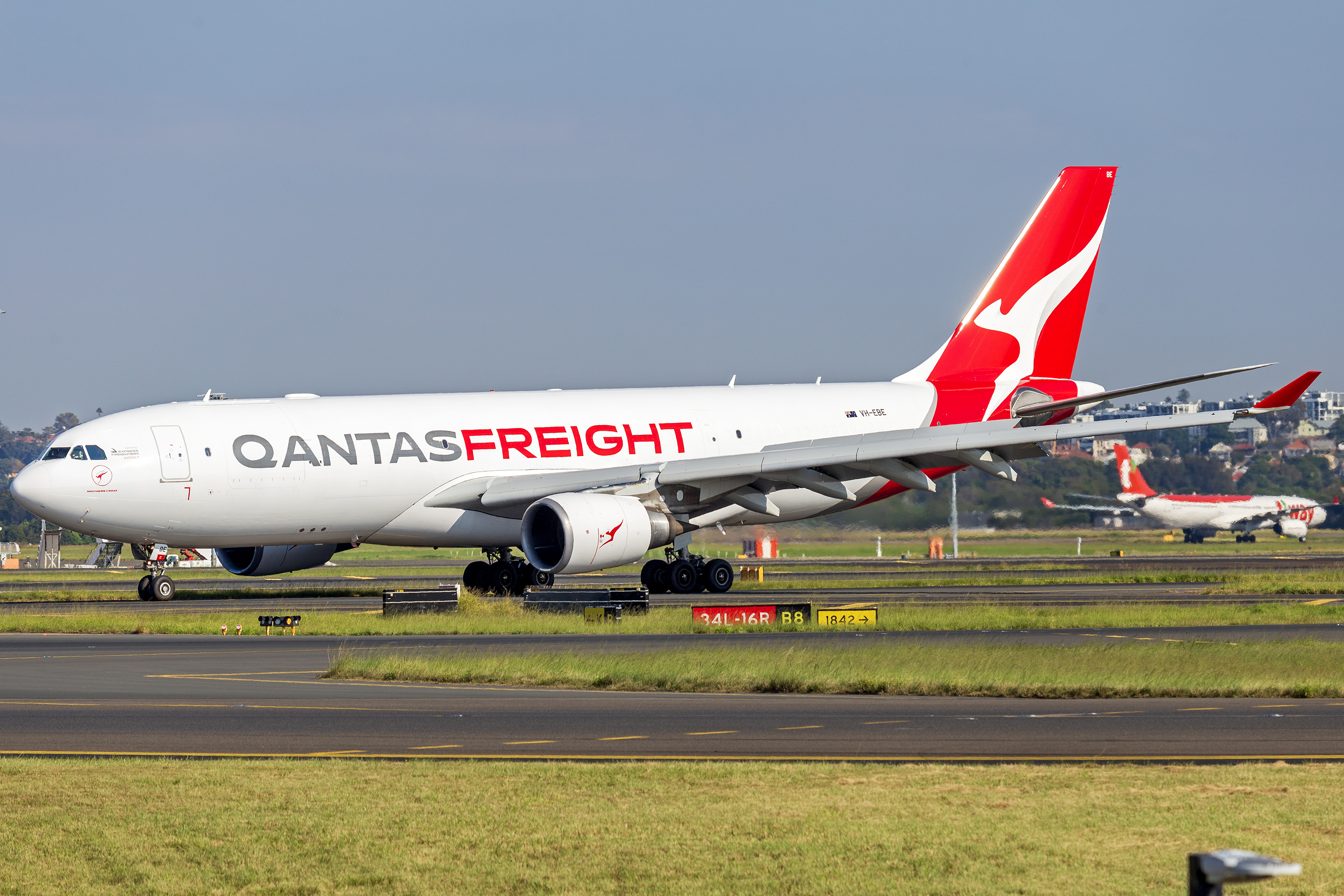
- Qantas Freight Airbus A330-202/P2F, operated by Express Freighters Australia
IATA	ICAO	Call sign
QF	QFA	QANTAS
- Founded: 2001; 25 years ago
- Hubs: Brisbane; Melbourne; Sydney
- Subsidiaries: Express Freighters Australia
- Fleet size: 10
- Parent company: Qantas
- Headquarters: Sydney, New South Wales, Australia
- Key people: Cam Wallace (CEO, Qantas International & Freight)
- Website: www.qantasfreight.com

Qantas Freight is a cargo airline owned by Qantas. It is the owner of freight airline Express Freighters Australia, freight forwarder Qantas Courier and trucking company Jets Transport Express. Qantas Freight was also a partner in two joint ventures with Australia Post: Australian airExpress, specialising in door-to-door package delivery, and StarTrack, a road freight company. In November 2012, Qantas Freight acquired full ownership of Australia air Express and divested its shareholding in Star Track to Australia Post. Qantas Freight was also the owner of Asian-based freight forwarder DPEXWorldwide until that company was acquired by its competitor Toll Holdings in 2010. Qantas Freight is also responsible for placing freight in the hold of Qantas and Jetstar operated international and domestic services.

== Destinations ==
As of October 2024, Qantas Freight directly serves 50 international and 80 domestic destinations. Qantas Freight has the ability to reach 480 global destinations through its airline partners, including Emirates, which it signed a cargo cooperation agreement with in 2024.

Country	City	Airport	Notes	Refs
Australia	Adelaide	Adelaide Airport		
Australia	Brisbane	Brisbane Airport	Hub	
Australia	Cairns	Cairns Airport		
Australia	Darwin	Darwin Airport		
Australia	Hobart	Hobart Airport		
Australia	Launceston	Launceston Airport		
Australia	Mackay	Mackay Airport		
Australia	Melbourne	Melbourne Airport	Hub	
Australia	Perth	Perth Airport		
Australia	Rockhampton	Rockhampton Airport		
Australia	Sydney	Sydney Airport	Hub	
Australia	Sydney	Western Sydney International Airport		
Australia	Townsville	Townsville Airport		
China	Chongqing	Chongqing Jiangbei International Airport		
China	Hong Kong	Hong Kong International Airport		
China	Shanghai	Shanghai Pudong International Airport		
Indonesia	Jakarta	Soekarno–Hatta International Airport		
New Zealand	Auckland	Auckland Airport		
New Zealand	Christchurch	Christchurch Airport		
Thailand	Bangkok	Suvarnabhumi Airport		
United States	Anchorage	Ted Stevens Anchorage International Airport		
United States	Chicago	O'Hare International Airport		
United States	Dallas	Dallas Fort Worth International Airport		
United States	Honolulu	Daniel K. Inouye International Airport		
United States	Los Angeles	Los Angeles International Airport		
United States	New York City	John F. Kennedy International Airport		

== Fleet ==
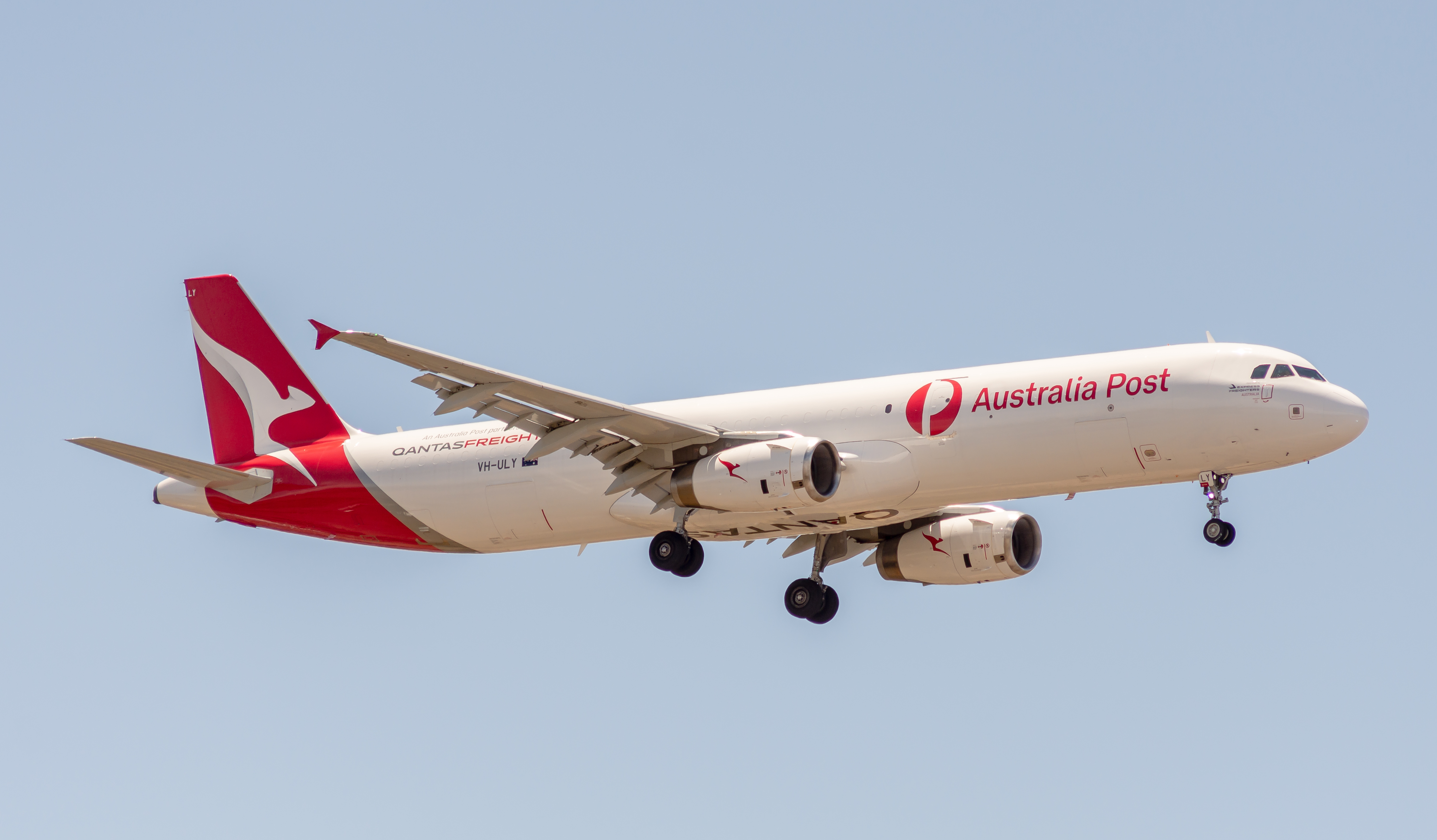
Airbus A321-200/P2F branded for Australia Post, 2022

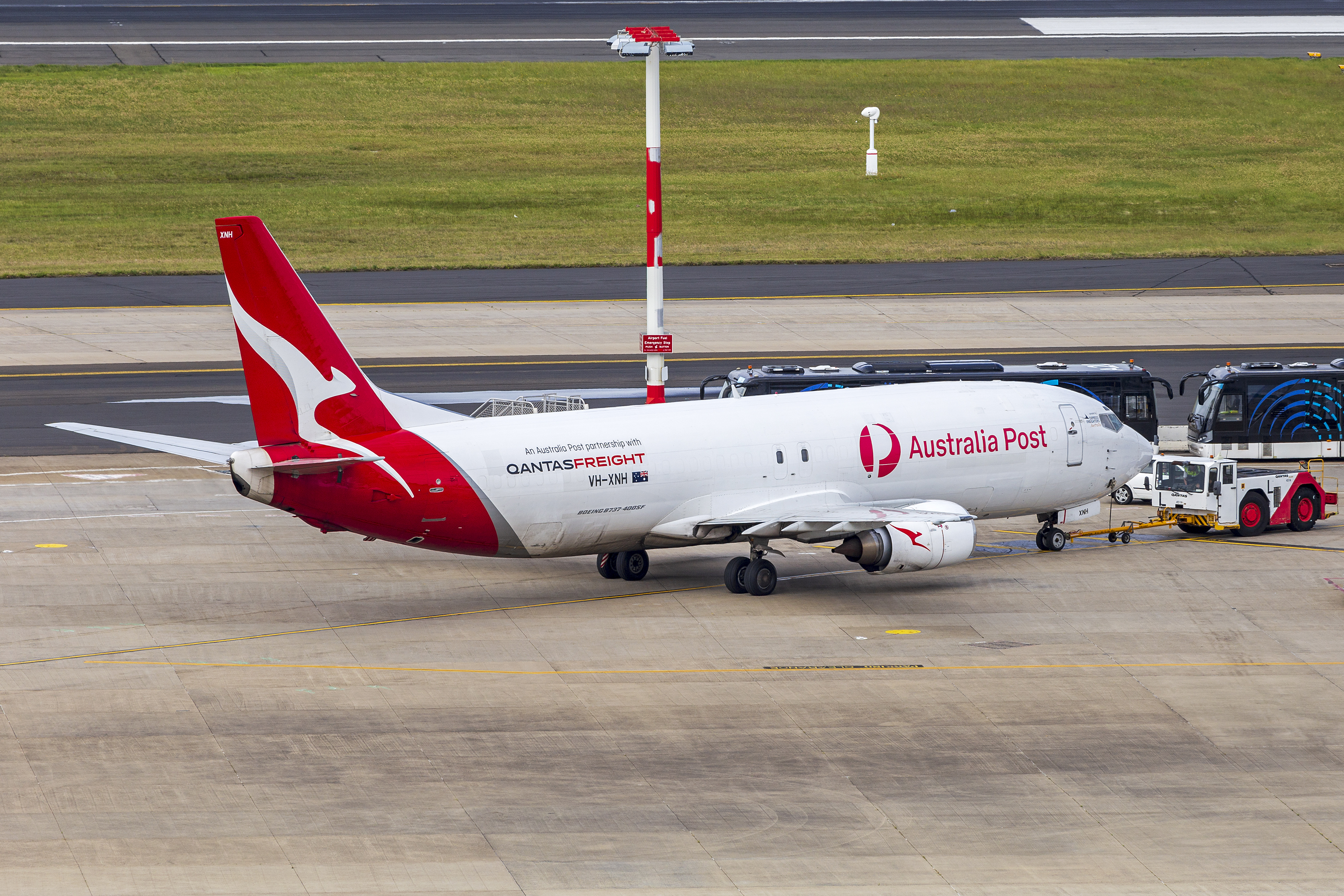
Boeing 737-400SF branded for Australia Post, 2020

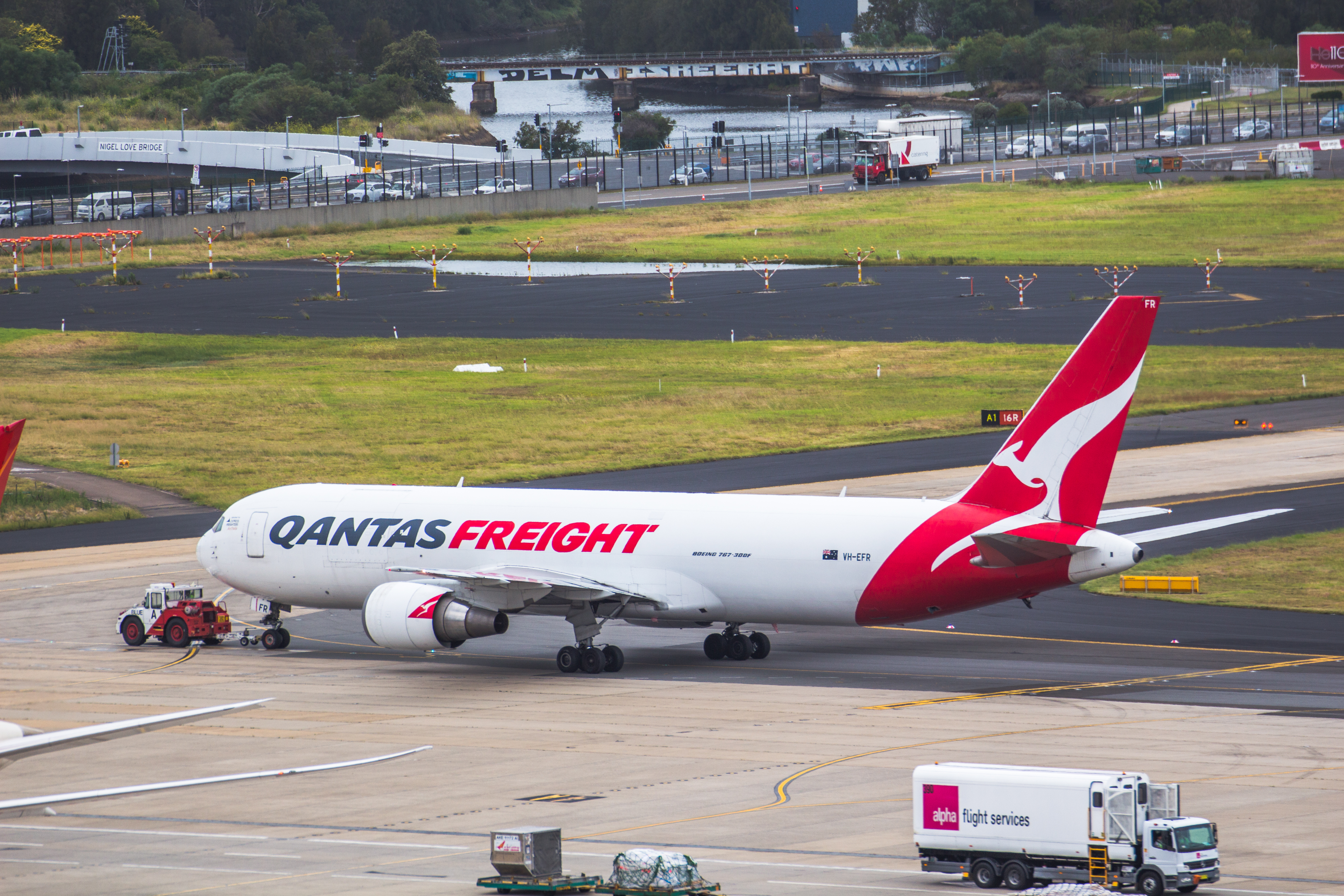
Boeing 767-300F in the 2007 livery, 2018

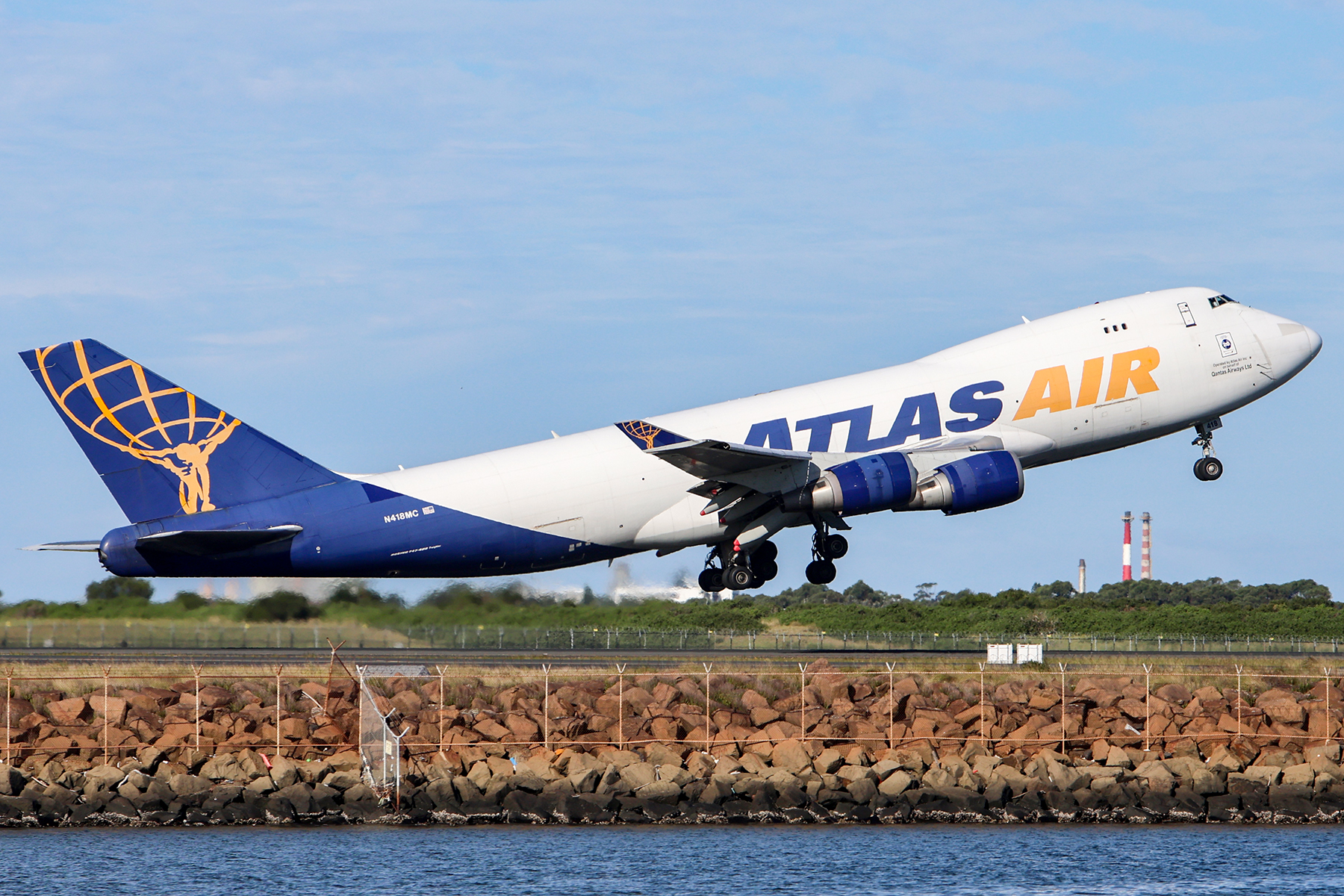
Boeing 747-400F wearing the Atlas Air livery, 2025

As of November 2024, Qantas Freight subsidiary Express Freighters Australia operates the following aircraft:

Aircraft	In service	Orders	Notes
Airbus A321-200/P2F	8	4	Launch customer. Operated for Australia Post/StarTrack. Deliveries through FY26.
Airbus A330-200/P2F	2	—	Converted from Qantas aircraft and delivered from 2023. One operated for Australia Post/StarTrack.
Total	10	4	

As of November 2024, Qantas Freight wet-leases 14 aircraft that operate both domestic and international services on behalf of the airline, these include:

- Aerlink - 1 ATR 72-200F (VH-AK3)
- Airwork - 2 Boeing 737-400F
- ASL Australia (Pionair) - 3 BAe 146-200 (QT) & 2 BAe 146-300 (QT)
- Atlas Air - 2 Boeing 747-400F
- National Jet Express - 3 BAe 146-300 (QT)

=== Fleet development ===
As at 2010, Qantas Freight wet leased three Boeing 747-400Fs from Atlas Air.

In June 2016, one Boeing 737-400F, two Boeing 737-300Fs and three BAe 146s were rebranded and are operated as a dedicated fleet for Australia Post and StarTrack.

In April 2019, Qantas Freight announced it would wet lease two Atlas Air Boeing 747-8Fs to replace its two wet leased Boeing 747-400Fs. The first aircraft landed in Sydney on 27 August with small Qantas Freight decals applied (visible when the forward nose cargo door is open), with the second due later in the week.

In August 2019, Qantas Freight announced a deal with Australia Post which was worth $1.4 billion. Included in the deal was Qantas Freight's announcement of the purchase of the world's first A321P2F, of which they ordered three to be delivered from October 2020.

In December 2019, ASL Airlines Australia (formally Pionair) put the first BAe 146 into service on a wet-lease for Qantas Freight since then this has steadily increased to have all five of ASL's BAe 146 aircraft operating for Qantas.

In February 2023, Qantas announced that three additional A321P2F would be ordered for delivery in 2024 and 2025.

In May 2024, Aerlink announced it would operate a wet-leased ATR 72-200F, VH-AK3, for Qantas Freight in Queensland, between Brisbane, Mackay and Rockhampton, with the service beginning in late June 2024.

=== Former fleet ===
Aircraft	Number	Introduced	Retired	Replacement
Boeing 737-300F	4	2013	2024	Airbus A321-200/P2F
Boeing 737-400F	1	2017	2024	Airbus A321-200/P2F
Boeing 767-300F	1	2010	2024	Airbus A330-200/P2F

== Price-fixing case ==
Legal action was brought in the United States against a number of airlines' freight operations over allegations of price fixing between 2000 and 2006, including Qantas Freight. Following the imposition of a fine of US$300 million on British Airways, in November 2007, Qantas Freight agreed to plead guilty in a US court and was fined US$61 million. In a separate development the former head of Qantas Freight in the United States was sentenced to eight months imprisonment in May 2008. The Australian Competition & Consumer Commission also launched legal action in Australia, and in October 2008, Qantas' management agreed to settle the case with a fine of A$20 million. Qantas is also facing a number of class action lawsuits.
