= Strzelecki, Tasmania =

Strzelecki Tasmania
- Coordinates: 40°13′23″S 148°06′28″E
- Population: nil (2016 census) K
- Postcode(s): 7255
- Location: 21 km (13 mi) SE of Whitemark
- LGA(s): Flinders
- Region: North-east
- State electorate(s): Bass
- Federal division(s): Bass
Localities around Strzelecki:
Loccota	Ranga	Lady Barron
Loccota	Strzelecki	Lady Barron
Loccota	Loccota	Bass Strait

Strzelecki is a rural locality in the Flinders local government area (LGA) in the North-east LGA region of Tasmania. It is located approximately 21 kilometres (13 mi) south-east of the town of Whitemark. The 2016 census recorded a nil population for the state suburb of Strzelecki.

== History ==
Strzelecki is recognised as a confirmed locality.

== Geography ==
The waters of Bass Strait form the south-eastern boundary. Most of the locality boundaries are common to the Strzelecki National Park.

== Road infrastructure ==
Route C806 (Trousers Point Road / Big River Road) provides access to the locality.
