= Killiecrankie, Tasmania =

Killiecrankie
- Town
- Coordinates: 39°50′11″S 147°50′2″E
- Country: Australia
- State: Tasmania
- Region: North-east
- LGA: Flinders Council
- Location: 38 km (24 mi) N of Whitemark

Government
  - State electorate: Bass
  - Federal division: Bass

Population
  - Total: 24 (2016 census)
- Postcode: 7255
Localities around Killiecrankie
Bass Strait	Palana	Wingaroo
Bass Strait	Killiecrankie	Wingaroo
Bass Strait	Leeka	Wingaroo

Killiecrankie is a rural locality on Flinders Island in the local government area (LGA) of Flinders in the North-east LGA region of Tasmania. The locality is about 38 kilometres (24 mi) north of the town of Whitemark. The 2016 census recorded a population of 24 for the state suburb of Killiecrankie.

== History ==
Killiecrankie was gazetted as a locality in 1956. It is believed to be named for Killiecrankie in Scotland.

== Geography ==
The waters of Bass Strait form the north-western and western boundaries.

== Transportation ==
Route B85 (Palana Road) runs through from south to north. Killiecrankie Airstrip (ICAO designator YKCK) serves the region.
