= Emita, Tasmania =

Emita Tasmania
- Coordinates: 40°01′07″S 147°54′29″E
- Population: 68 (2016 census)
- Postcode(s): 7255
- Location: 16 km (10 mi) NW of Whitemark
- LGA(s): Flinders
- Region: North-east
- State electorate(s): Bass
- Federal division(s): Bass
Localities around Emita:
Bass Strait	Lughrata	Memana
Bass Strait	Emita	Memana
Bass Strait	Blue Rocks	Whitemark

Emita is a rural locality on Flinders Island in the local government area of Flinders in the North-east region of Tasmania. It is located about 16 kilometres (9.9 mi) north-west of the town of Whitemark. The 2016 census determined a population of 68 for the state suburb of Emita.

== History ==
Emita was gazetted as a locality in 1970. The name is an Aboriginal word for “sand”, and has been used by the Aboriginal community since the 1800s. The first European name was Settlement Point, which had been changed to Emita by 1916.

== Geography ==
Bass Strait forms the north-west, west, and south-west boundaries.

== Road infrastructure ==
The B85 route (Palana Road) enters from the south and runs through, via the village, to the north before exiting. Route C801 (Fairhaven Road) starts at an intersection with B85 near the northern boundary and runs east before exiting.
