= Leeka =

- Town
- Coordinates: 39°53′35″S 147°49′41″E
- Country: Australia
- State: Tasmania
- Region: North-east
- LGA: Flinders Council
- Location: 38 km (24 mi) NW of Whitemark

Government
  - State electorate: Bass
  - Federal division: Bass

Population
  - Total: nil (2016 census)
- Postcode: 7255
Localities around Leeka
Killiecrankie	Killiecrankie	Wingaroo
Killiecrankie	Leeka	Wingaroo
Bass Strait	Bass Strait	Lughrata

Leeka is a rural locality on Flinders Island in the local government area (LGA) of Flinders in the North-east LGA region of Tasmania. The locality is about 38 kilometres (24 mi) north-west of the town of Whitemark. The 2016 census recorded a population of nil for the state suburb of Leeka.

== History ==
Leeka was gazetted as a locality in 1970.

== Geography ==
The waters of Bass Strait form the southern boundary.

== Road infrastructure ==
Route B85 (Palana Road) runs along the eastern boundary. From there, West End Road provides access to the locality.
