= Memana, Tasmania =

Memana Tasmania
- Coordinates: 39°59′56″S 147°59′51″E
- Population: 102 (2016 census)
- Postcode(s): 7255
- Location: 23 km (14 mi) N of Whitemark
- LGA(s): Flinders
- Region: North-east
- State electorate(s): Bass
- Federal division(s): Bass
Localities around Memana:
Wingaroo	Wingaroo	Bass Strait
Lughrata, Emita, Blue Rocks, Whitemark	Memana	Bass Strait
Whitemark	Whitemark, Lackrana	Bass Strait

Memana is a rural locality on Flinders Island in the local government area of Flinders in the North-east region of Tasmania. It is located about 23 kilometres (14 mi) north of the town of Whitemark. The 2016 census determined a population of 102 for the state suburb of Memana.

== History ==
Memana was gazetted as a locality in 1955.

== Geography ==
Bass Strait forms the north-eastern and eastern boundaries.

== Road infrastructure ==
The C803 route (Memana Road / Lackrana Road) enters from the south-west and runs north-east to the centre of the locality, where it turns south-east and exits to the south. Route C801 (Lucks Road / Melrose Road) starts at an intersection with C803 and runs north and west before exiting. Route C804 (Summer Camp Road) is a loop road from and to C803 in the centre of the locality.
