= Lughrata, Tasmania =

Lughrata
- Town
- Coordinates: 39°56′51″S 147°55′49″E
- Country: Australia
- State: Tasmania
- Region: North-east
- LGA: Flinders
- Location: 25 km (16 mi) NW of Whitemark

Government
  - State electorate: Bass
  - Federal division: Bass

Population
  - Total: 14 (2016 census) K
- Postcode: 7255
Localities around Lughrata
Leeka	Wingaroo	Memana
Bass Strait	Lughrata	Emita, Memana
Emita	Emita	Emita

Lughrata is a rural locality in the local government area (LGA) of Flinders in the North-east LGA region of Tasmania. The locality is about 25 kilometres (16 mi) north-west of the town of Whitemark. The 2016 census recorded a population of 14 for the state suburb of Lughrata.

== History ==
Lughrata was gazetted as a locality in 1970. It is believed to be an Aboriginal word for "hot".

== Geography ==
The waters of Bass Strait form the western boundary.

== Road infrastructure ==
Route B85 (Palana Road) runs through from south to north.
