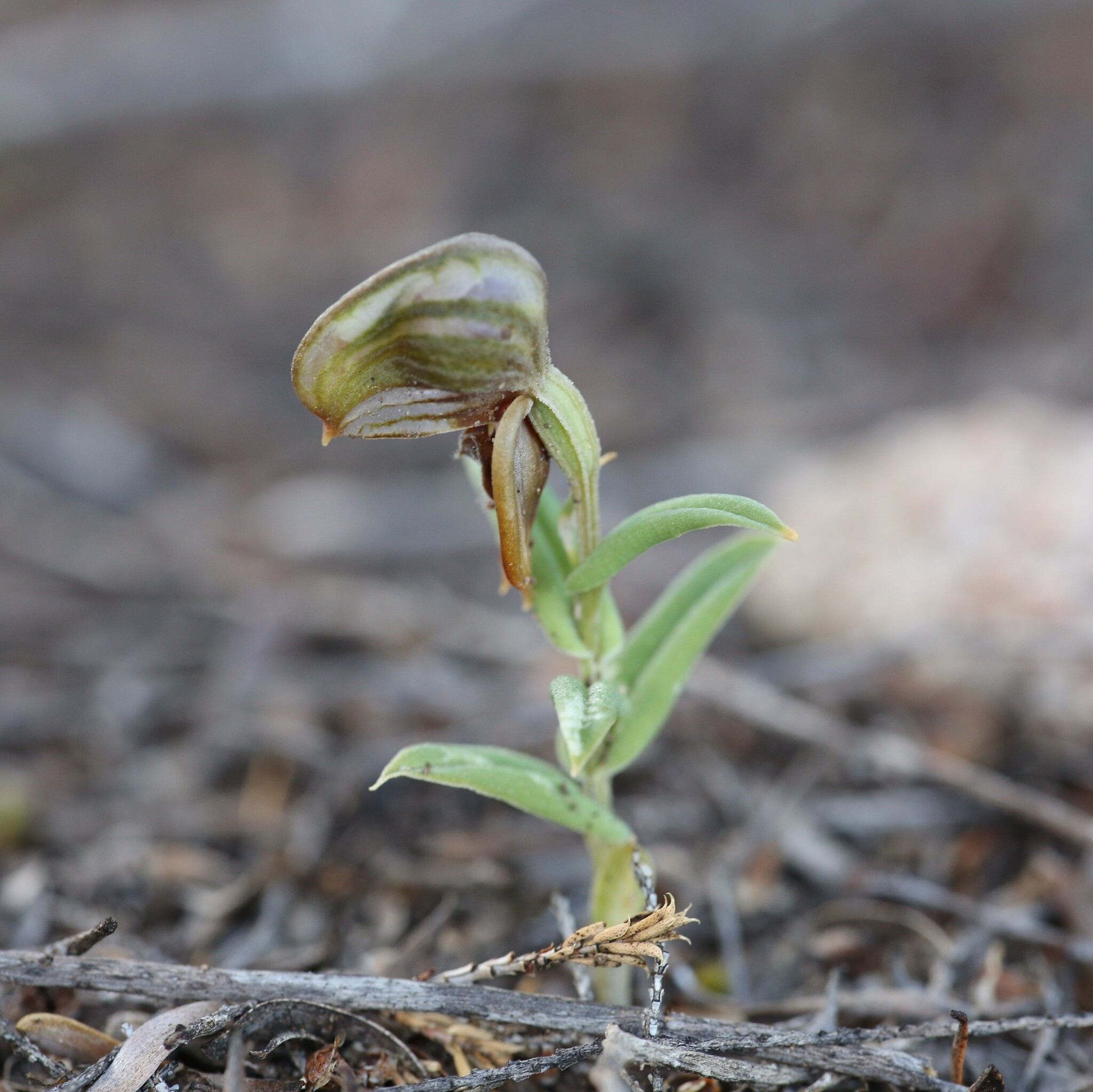
- Near Lake Hurlstone Nature Reserve

Scientific classification
- Kingdom: Plantae
- Clade: Tracheophytes
- Clade: Angiosperms
- Clade: Monocots
- Order: Asparagales
- Family: Orchidaceae
- Subfamily: Orchidoideae
- Tribe: Cranichideae
- Genus: Pterostylis
- Species: P. arbuscula

Binomial name
- Pterostylis arbuscula (D.L.Jones & C.J.French) D.L.Jones & C.J.French

Synonyms
- Pterostylis aff. sanguinea; Pterostylis arbuscula D.L.Jones & C.J.French nom. inval.; Pterostylis sp. 'Eyre'; Pterostylis sp. 'Eyre'; Urochilus arbusculus D.L.Jones & C.J.French

= Pterostylis arbuscula =

Species of plant

Pterostylis arbuscula, commonly known as dark banded greenhood, or mallee banded greenhood, is a species of orchid endemic to the south of continental Australia. It has a rosette of leaves borne above the ground and up to 3 dark reddish brown to blackish brown to green flowers with white bands, and is found in Western Australia and South Australia.

== Description ==
Pterostylis arbuscula is a terrestrial, perennial, herb that typically grows to a height of 50–100 mm (2.0–3.9 in) tall and has a rosette of egg-shaped leaves 10–25 mm (0.39–0.98 in) long and 5–10 mm (0.20–0.39 in) wide on a petiole up to 6 mm (0.24 in) long, and borne above ground level. There are 5 to 8 dark green leaves on the stem that are elliptic to egg-shaped, 1.3–2.5 mm (0.051–0.098 in) long 3–6 mm (0.12–0.24 in) wide. Up to 3 more or less "nodding", dark reddish-brown to green, white banded flowers 13–16 mm (0.51–0.63 in) long and 8–12 mm (0.31–0.47 in) wide are borne on a pedicel and 3–5 mm (0.12–0.20 in) long. The dorsal sepal is 13–16 mm (0.51–0.63 in) long, the lateral sepals are 10–14 mm (0.39–0.55 in) long and 8–12 mm (0.31–0.47 in) wide. The petals are 9–12 mm (0.35–0.47 in) long and about 4 mm (0.16 in) wide and translucent with reddish-brown lines. The labellum is egg-shaped with the narrower end towards the base, 5.0–5.5 mm (0.20–0.22 in) long and 2.5–3 mm (0.098–0.118 in) wide. Flowering occurs from June to late August.

== Taxonomy and naming ==
This greenhood was first formally described in 2017 by David Jones and Christopher French who gave it the name Urochilus arbusculus from a specimen collected by French on the Hyden-Lake King road in 2017. In 2018, Jones and French transferred the species to Pterostylis as P. arbuscula. The specific epithet (arbuscula) means "sapling" or "small tree", referring to this orchid growing in mallee communities.

== Distribution and habitat ==
The dark banded greenhood grows in mallee shrubland and woodland in Western Australia and South Australia. (In Victoria it is included in the circumscription of P. sanguinea.) In South Australia it is mainly found away from the coast in drier areas, and in Western Australia it is mainly found in inland areas between Ravensthorpe, Brookton, Merredin and Toolinna Cove in the south-west of the state.

== Conservation ==
Pterostylis arbuscula is listed as "not threatened" in Western Australia by the Government of Western Australia Department of Parks and Wildlife.
