= Lackrana, Tasmania =

Lackrana Tasmania
- Coordinates: 40°06′20″S 148°09′48″E
- Population: 75 (2016 census)
- Postcode(s): 7255
- Location: 29 km (18 mi) E of Whitemark
- LGA(s): Flinders
- Region: North-east
- State electorate(s): Bass
- Federal division(s): Bass
Localities around Lackrana:
Memana	Memana	Bass Strait
Whitemark	Lackrana	Bass Strait
Ranga	Lady Barron, Ranga	Bass Strait

Lackrana is a rural locality on Flinders Island in the local government area of Flinders in the North-east region of Tasmania. It is located about 29 kilometres (18 mi) east of the town of Whitemark. The 2016 census determined a population of 75 for the state suburb of Lackrana.

== History ==
Lackrana was gazetted as a locality in 1963.

== Geography ==
Bass Strait forms the eastern boundary.

== Road infrastructure ==
The B85 route (Lady Barron Road) enters from the south-west and exits to the south. Route C803 (Lackrana Road) starts at an intersection with B85 near the south-west boundary and runs north through the locality before exiting.
