= Lady Barron, Tasmania =

Lady Barron Tasmania
- Coordinates: 40°12′45″S 148°14′30″E
- Population: 158 (2016 census)
- Postcode(s): 7255
- Location: 28 km (17 mi) SE of Whitemark
- LGA(s): Flinders Council
- Region: North-east
- State electorate(s): Bass
- Federal division(s): Bass
Localities around Lady Barron:
Ranga	Lackrana	Bass Strait
Strzelecki National Park	Lady Barron	Bass Strait
Strzelecki NP	Bass Strait	Bass Strait

Lady Barron is a small settlement on the southern end of Flinders Island, in the local government area of Flinders in the North-east region of Tasmania. It is located about 28 kilometres (17 mi) south-east of the town of Whitemark. The 2016 census determined a population of 158 for the state suburb of Lady Barron.

It is the second largest town on Flinders Island, after Whitemark. The town has a small airport and a ferry terminal for the Bridport to Flinders Island ferry service. It appears to have been named for Lady Clara Barron, wife of Major General Sir Harry Barron, who was Governor of Tasmania from 1909 to 1913. The Barrons married in 1877 and had a daughter.

== Life ==
Facilities include a post office/general store, a hotel/tavern and a church. The town's seafront has a sheltered aspect with views across to Vansittart Island, Little Dog Island, Great Dog Island, Little Green Island and Cape Barren Island.

== History ==
Lady Barron was gazetted as a locality in 1970.

== Geography ==
Bass Strait forms the southern and eastern boundaries.

== Road infrastructure ==
The B85 route (Lady Barron Road) enters from the north and runs to the village in the south. Route C805 (Coast Road) starts at an intersection with B85 in the village and runs west along the coast and then north-west across the locality before exiting.
