= Wingaroo =

- Town
- Coordinates: 39°50′36″S 147°58′13″E
- Country: Australia
- State: Tasmania
- Region: North-east
- LGA: Flinders
- Location: 42 km (26 mi) N of Whitemark

Government
  - State electorate: Bass
  - Federal division: Bass

Population
  - Total: nil (2016 census)
- Postcode: 7255
Localities around Wingaroo
Palana	Palana	Bass Strait
Leeka, Killiecrankie	Wingaroo	Bass Strait
Lughrata	Lughrata, Memana	Memana

Wingaroo is a rural locality in the local government area (LGA) of Flinders in the North-east LGA region of Tasmania. The locality is about 42 kilometres (26 mi) north of the town of Whitemark. The 2016 census recorded a population of nil for the state suburb of Wingaroo.

== History ==
Wingaroo is a confirmed locality.

== Geography ==
The waters of Bass Strait form the north-eastern boundary.

== Road infrastructure ==
Route B85 (Palana Road) provides access to the locality.
