= Flinders Island Airport =

Airport in Whitemark, Flinders Island, Tasmania, Australia

- IATA: FLS; ICAO: YFLI

Summary
- Airport type: Public
- Operator: Flinders Council
- Serves: Flinders Island
- Location: Whitemark, Tasmania
- Opened: 16 February 1935
- Elevation AMSL: 34 ft (10 m)
- Coordinates: 40°05′29″S 147°59′34″E
- Website: flinders.tas.gov.au/flinders-island-airport

Maps
- Location in Tasmania
- Interactive map of Flinders Island Airport

Runways
Direction	Length		Surface
Direction	m	ft	Surface
14/32	1,720	5,643	Asphalt
05/23	1,070	3,510	Asphalt

Statistics (2024–25)
- Passengers: 19,429 ▼8.1%
- Sources: Australian AIP and aerodrome chart

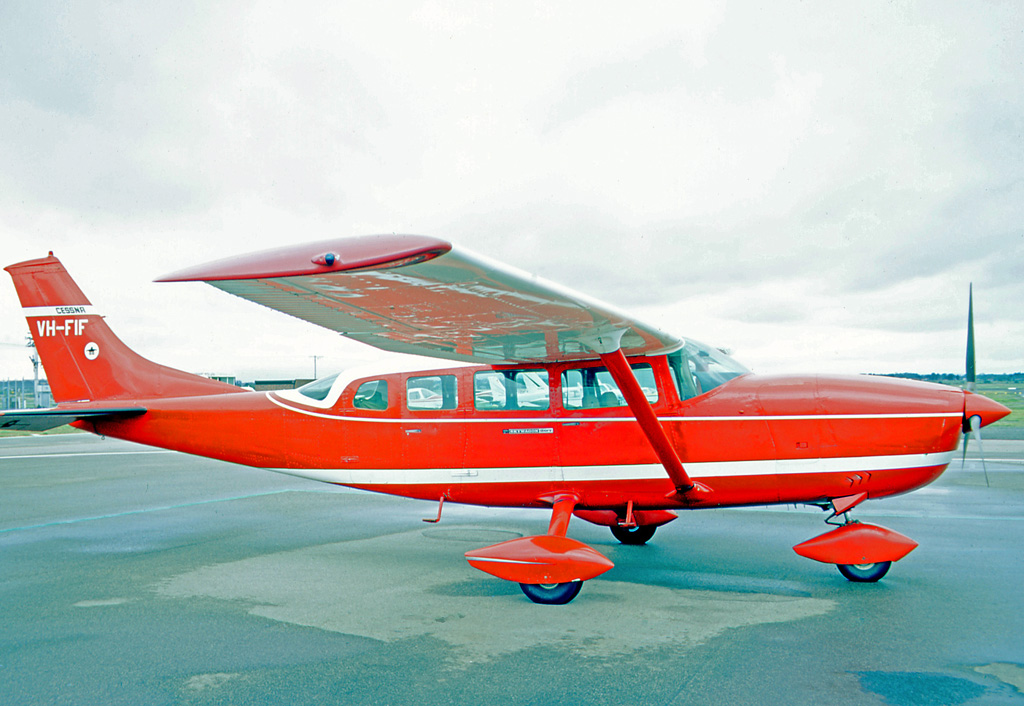
Cessna 207 of Flinders Island Airways in January 1971

Flinders Island Airport (IATA: FLS, ICAO: YFLI) is a small regional airport located 2 nautical miles (3.7 km; 2.3 mi) northwest of Whitemark on Flinders Island off the north-east coast of Tasmania, Australia. The airport is owned and operated by the Flinders Council. The airport site has a total area of approximately 134 hectares.

== History ==
The first aerodrome on Flinders Island began operating in March 1932, as a landing strip on the property of A. G. Woodside's property, five kilometres from Whitemark. Flinders Island Municipal Council had sought to establish an aerodrome for mail planes and commercial flights after Launceston Airport was established in 1930 and commercial flights commenced to Melbourne's Essendon Airport. In 1934, the aerodrome was moved to a new site next to St Pats River, with the first plane ("Miss Launceston" operated by Holyman's Airways) landing there on 18 December 1934, and the airport officially opening on 16 February 1935.

In January 2025, Flinders Council received a AUD$2.68 million grant from the Australian government to begin modernisation upgrades, and sought an additional $300,000 from the Tasmanian government to complete stage one works including upgrading its electrical system and constructing a new operations building. Stage two works will involve resurfacing and reconstructing the runway, at an estimated cost of $23 million.

== Traffic and statistics ==
The following table lists passenger statistics for Flinders Island Airport.

Annual passenger statistics
Year	Passenger movements
2020–21	22,183
2021–22	22,855
2022–23	22,632
2023–24	21,131
2024–25	19,429

== See also ==
- List of airports in Tasmania
