= Ranga, Tasmania =

Ranga Tasmania
- Coordinates: 40°09′10″S 148°03′33″E
- Population: 48 (2016 census)
- Postcode(s): 7255
- Location: 9 km (6 mi) SE of Whitemark
- LGA(s): Flinders
- Region: North-east
- State electorate(s): Bass
- Federal division(s): Bass
Localities around Ranga:
Whitemark	Whitemark, Lackrana	Lackrana
Loccota	Ranga	Lackrana
Loccota	Strzelecki National Park	Lady Barron

Ranga is a rural locality on Flinders Island in the local government area of Flinders in the North-east region of Tasmania. It is located about 9 kilometres (5.6 mi) south-east of the town of Whitemark. The 2016 census determined a population of 48 for the state suburb of Ranga.

== History ==
Ranga is a confirmed suburb/locality.

== Geography ==
Strzelecki National Park forms most of the southern boundary.

== Road infrastructure ==
The B85 route (Lady Barron Road Road) enters from the north-west and runs through the village to exit in the east. Route C805 (Coast Road) starts at an intersection with B85 in the village and runs south-east until it exits. Route C806 (Trousers Point Road) starts at an intersection with B85 in the west and runs south until it exits.
