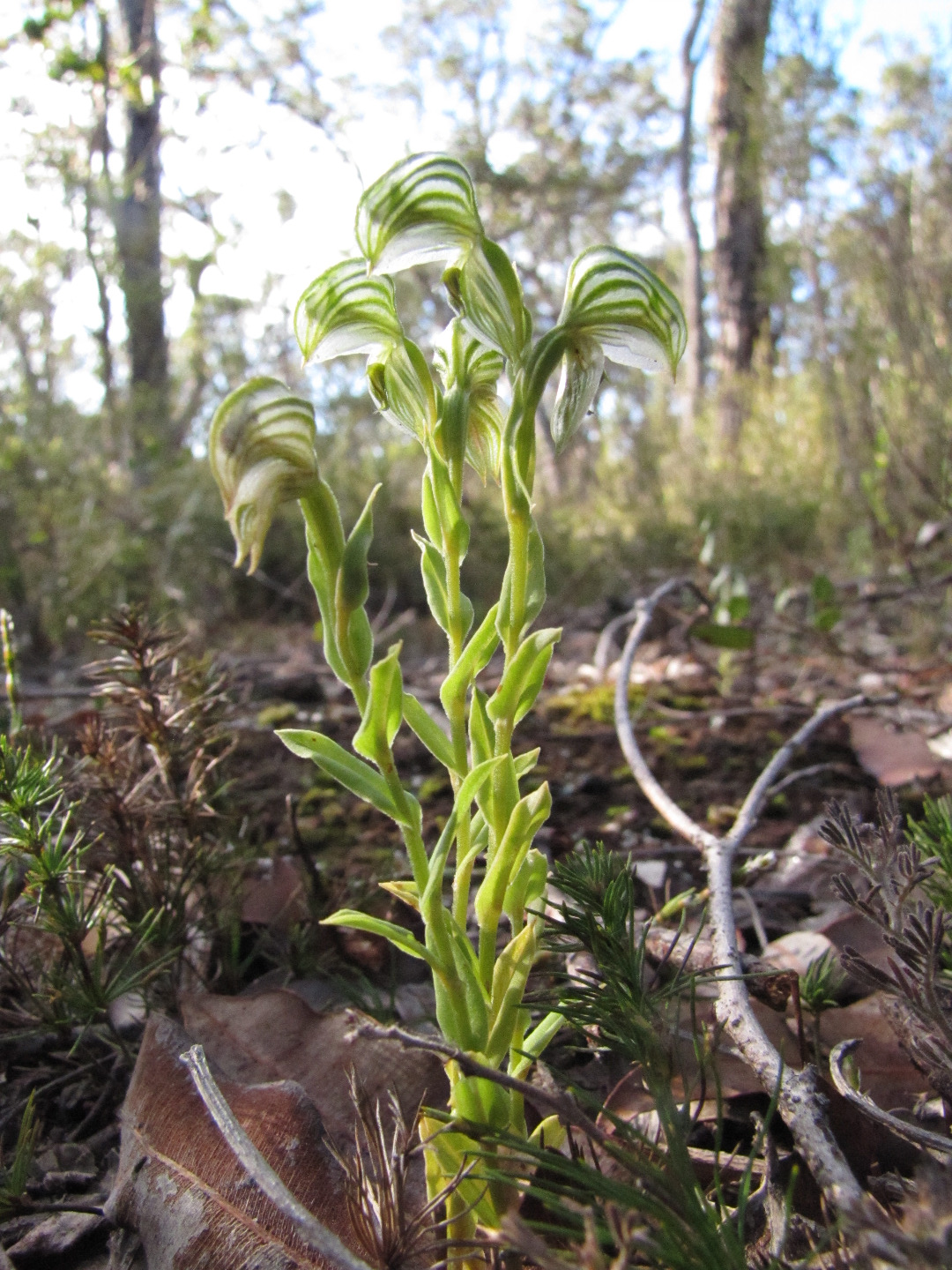

Scientific classification
- Kingdom: Plantae
- Clade: Tracheophytes
- Clade: Angiosperms
- Clade: Monocots
- Order: Asparagales
- Family: Orchidaceae
- Subfamily: Orchidoideae
- Tribe: Cranichideae
- Genus: Pterostylis
- Species: P. vittata

Binomial name
- Pterostylis vittata Lindl.

Synonyms
- Oligochaetochilus vittata Szlach. orth. var.; Oligochaetochilus vittatus (Lindl.) Szlach.; Pterostylis praecocissima Benth. nom. inval., pro syn.; Pterostylis sp. 'grey bands'; Pterostylis sp. 'grey bands'; Pterostylis vittata var. major Endl. nom. inval., nom. nud.; Pterostylis vittata var. minor Endl. nom. inval., nom. nud.; Pterostylis vittata var. viridiflora Nicholls; Pterostylis vittata Lindl. var. vittata; Urochilus vittatus (Lindl.) D.L.Jones & M.A.Clem.

= Pterostylis vittata =

Banded greenhood

Species of orchid

Pterostylis vittata, commonly known as banded greenhood or green-banded greenhood, is a plant in the orchid family Orchidaceae and is endemic to the south-west of Western Australia. The plants either have a rosette of leaves on a short stalk in the years when not flowering or stem leaves on a flowering spike. When flowering, it has up to about twenty five flowers which are translucent green with darker green stripes. It was formerly thought to occur in South Australia and Victoria but those collections are now thought to be of Pterostylis sanguinea.

== Description ==
Pterostylis vittata, is a terrestrial, perennial, deciduous, herb with an underground tuber. Non-flowering plants have a rosette of between three and seven leaves, each leaf 10–30 mm (0.4–1 in) long and 5–18 mm (0.2–0.7 in) wide, the rosette on a stalk 20–60 mm (0.8–2 in) long. When flowering, there are up to twenty five transparent green flowers with darker green bands borne on a flowering spike 200–450 mm (8–20 in) high. The flowering spike has between three and fourteen stem leaves which are 20–50 mm (0.8–2 in) long and 4–7 mm (0.2–0.3 in) wide. The flowers are 12–15 mm (0.5–0.6 in) long, 8–10 mm (0.3–0.4 in) wide. The dorsal sepal and petals form a hood or "galea" over the column. The lateral sepals turn downwards, are 9–10 mm (0.35–0.39 in) long, 8–9 mm (0.3–0.4 in) wide and joined at their bases. The labellum is green, hairy and insect-like, about 4 mm (0.2 in) long and 3 mm (0.1 in) wide and flicks upwards when touched. Flowering occurs from May to September.

== Taxonomy and naming ==
Pterostylis vittata was first formally described in 1840 by John Lindley and the description was published in A Sketch of the Vegetation of the Swan River Colony. The specific epithet (vittata) is a Latin word meaning "striped" or "banded", referring to the striped galea.

== Distribution and habitat ==
Banded greenhood occurs to the south of Perth and as far east as Balladonia, growing in forest, woodland and heath, although more often on granite outcrops in the east of its range. It was previously thought to occur in South Australia, Victoria and Tasmania, but those collections are now thought to be of P. sanguinea.

== Conservation ==
Pterostylis vittata is classified as "not threatened" by the Government of Western Australia Department of Parks and Wildlife.
