= Palana, Tasmania =

Palana Tasmania
- Coordinates: 39°46′12″S 147°53′56″E
- Population: 21 (2016 census)
- Postcode(s): 7255
- Location: 45 km (28 mi) N of Whitemark
- LGA(s): Flinders
- Region: North-east
- State electorate(s): Bass
- Federal division(s): Bass
Localities around Palana:
Bass Strait	Bass Strait	Bass Strait
Bass Strait	Palana	Bass Strait
Killiecrankie	Killiecrankie, Wingaroo	Wingaroo

Palana is a rural locality on Flinders Island in the local government area of Flinders in the North-east region of Tasmania. It is located about 45 kilometres (28 mi) north of the town of Whitemark. The 2016 census determined a population of 21 for the state suburb of Palana.

== History ==
Palana was gazetted as a locality in 1970.

== Geography ==
Bass Strait forms the western, northern and eastern boundaries.

== Road infrastructure ==
The B85 route (Palana Road) enters from the south-west and runs to the village in the north-west.
