= Essendon Airport Air Traffic Control Tower =

Heritage-listed air traffic control tower

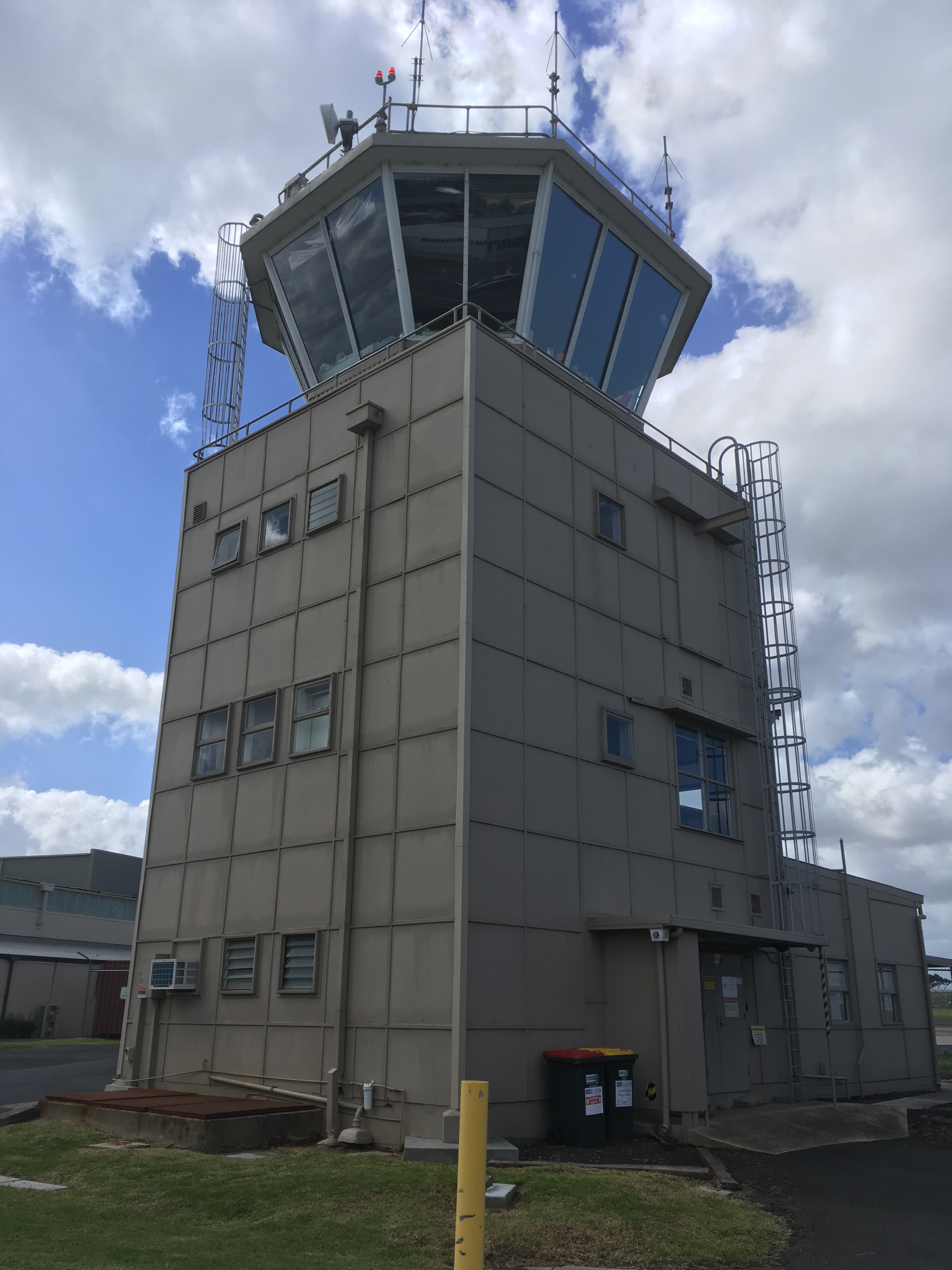
- Control tower, September 2017

- Location within Victoria
- 37.7253°S 144.8990°E
- Location: Wirraway Road, Strathmore, Victoria, Australia

History
- Built: October 1956

Commonwealth Heritage List
- Official name: Essendon Airport Air Traffic Control Tower
- Type: Listed place (Historic)
- Designated: 22 January 2016
- Reference no.: 106119

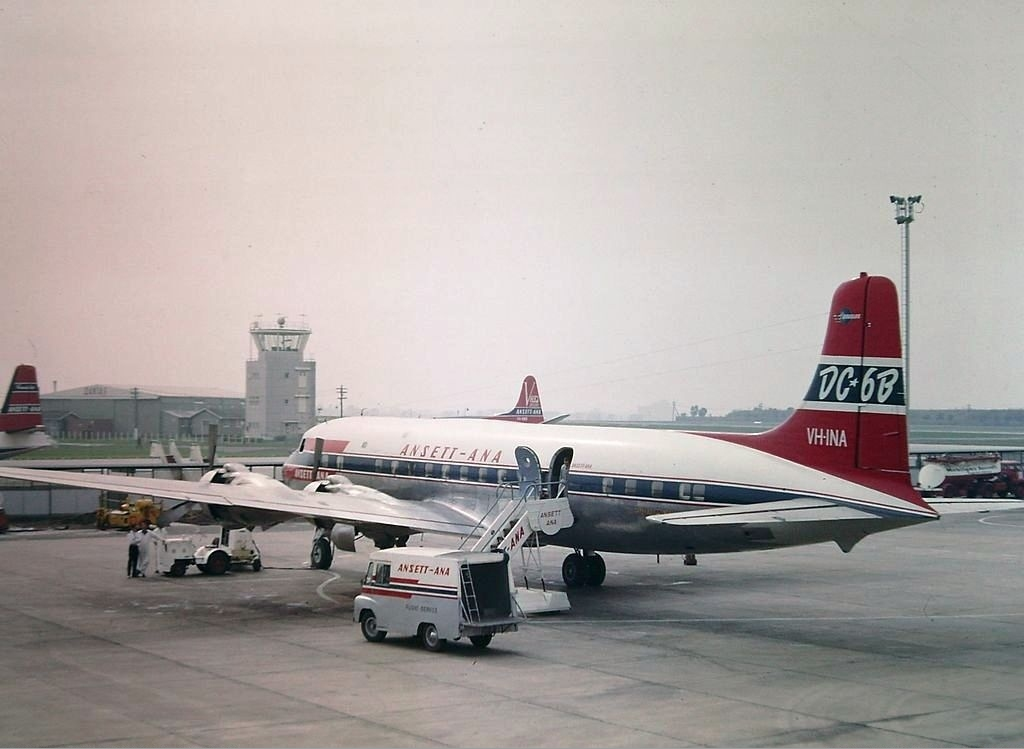
Control tower in the background, July 1963

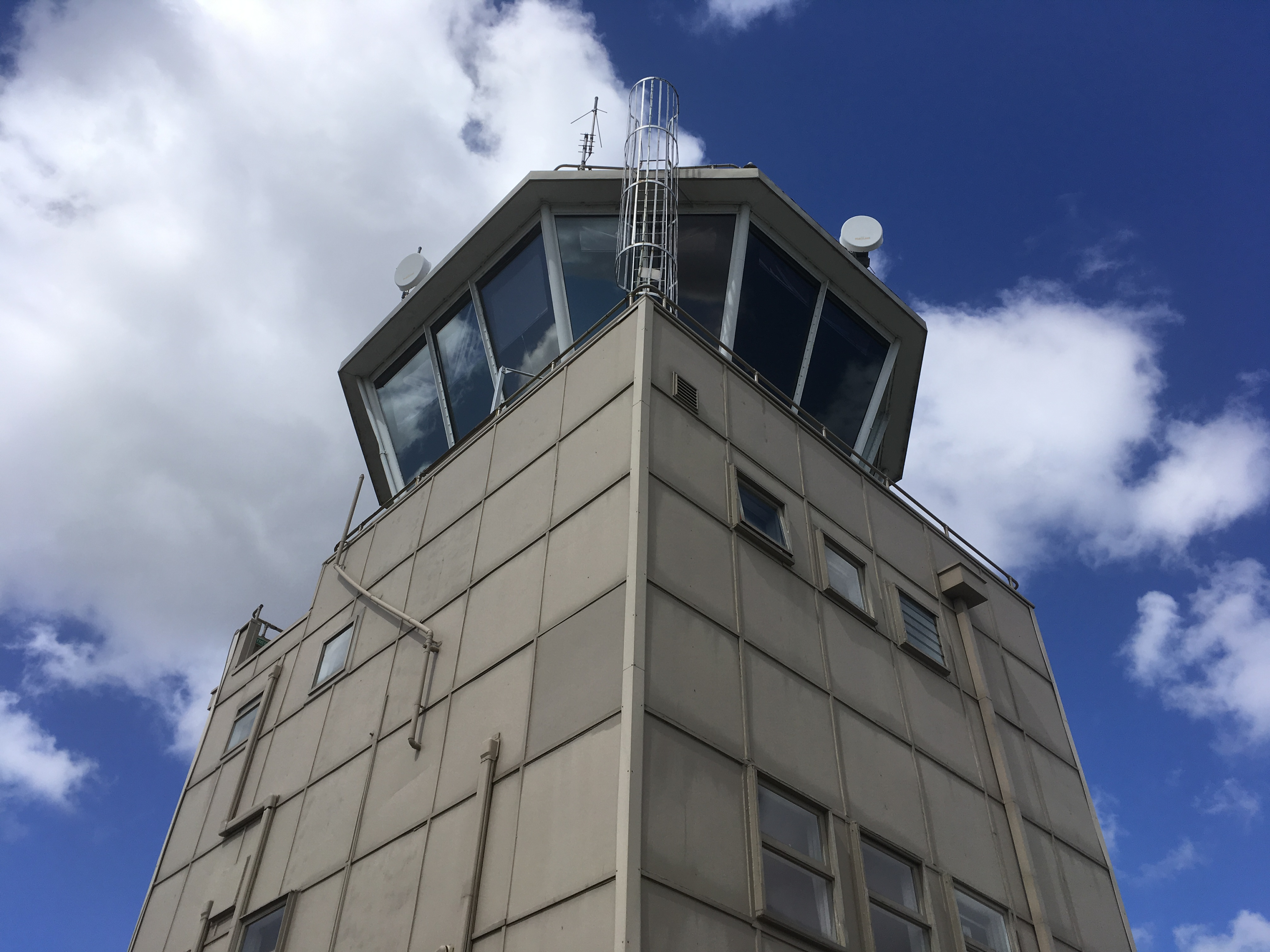
Close-up shot of the control tower, September 2017

Essendon Airport Air Traffic Control Tower is a heritage-listed air traffic control tower at Essendon Airport, Wirraway Road, Strathmore, Victoria, Australia. It was added to the Australian Commonwealth Heritage List on 22 January 2016.

== History ==
Essendon Airport is Australia's second oldest operational airport, after Sydney Airport. The present ATC Tower, the third at the airport, is one of the oldest operational ATC towers in the country.

Originally known as Melbourne Airport, Essendon Airport was developed from 11 August 1921, when notice of the Commonwealth's purchase of 91 acres of land at Essendon North, a site known locally as St John's, was published in the Commonwealth of Australia Gazette. The notice ended a debate about the location of Melbourne's new aerodrome. Airfields at Glen Huntly, Glenroy, Fishermans Bend and Coode Island had all been considered. The Essendon North site was approximately eight miles (13 km) from the city centre. Early developments and infrastructure improvements at the new airport were slow. In 1926 it was reported that the surface was, "too uneven for the operation of the Moth machines". A four-horse team and driver were hired to address the problem. The speed of progress increased in the 1930s, notably with the 1935 acquisition of a further 91 acres of land, and the unveiling in 1938 of a series of new facilities, including hangars, workshops, offices and the new £15,000 Australian National Airways (ANA) terminal building for "public accommodation" designed by Howard Garnet Alsop. This phase of works also included the airport's first ATC tower, a timber-framed cabin built into the roof of the Aero Club building, similar to the first ATC tower at Sydney Airport.

The building itself was designed by the Commonwealth of Australia Department of Works (Victoria & Tasmania Branch) for the Department of Civil Aviation. It was conceived of as a core component of an extensive and experimental system for the control of civil aircraft at what was then the busiest airport in the British Empire. In October 1956, the Department of Civil Aviation announced the completion of the system.

During the Olympic Games, to compensate for the lack of radar and a full Instrument Landing System at the new tower, the RAAF provided a portable Ground Control Approach radar unit to assist aircraft landing in darkness and inclement weather.

Construction of the new Melbourne Airport at Tullamarine began in 1964. It opened for international services on 1 July 1970. By then, a third airport, the Moorabbin Airport, which opened in 1949, had become well established as Melbourne's general aviation airport. This meant that Essendon's future was uncertain. Following the transfer of domestic airline activities to Tullamarine on 20 June 1971, an investigation was made into the consequences of retention or disposal of Essendon, however on 13 January 1976 it was decided to retain Essendon as an airport for the foreseeable future. In 2001, the continued status of at least some of the 305-hectare (750-acre) site as a centre for aviation was assured when the airport was acquired by Lindsay Fox and developer Becton. The joint venture partners paid $22 million for a 99-year lease, since when parts of the site have been developed for office and commercial use, and the airport infrastructure has been upgraded.

The building comprises a square three-storey base building, clad in asbestos cement sheeting supporting an elongated octagonal cabin. The cabin is raised on an elongated octagonal duct and service drum. The roof of the base building forms a walkway around the drum. The building's form and fabric are remarkably intact for a building that has operated continuously for over 50 years. The decision to construct a new airport for Melbourne only a few years after the completion of the tower, as well as a protracted period of uncertainty about the long term viability of Essendon as an airport, are both factors that may have contributed to the tower's survival and relative integrity. External and internal modifications to Essendon ATC tower have primarily been associated with systems upgrades, notably in the late-1960s. External changes include modifications to original openings and the construction of a large ground floor extension to the east. Internally, there have been a number of alterations, principally to the first and second floors though evidence remains of the original planning and some finishes. The original console (now at the nearby Airways Museum at Essendon Airport) and all original equipment have been removed.

== Description ==
Essendon Airport Air Traffic Control Tower is at approximately 140 sq metres, Wirraway Road, Essendon Airport, comprising the Air Traffic Control Tower and its base building located within Land Parcel PC354871 and centred on approximate MGA point Zone 55 314836mE 5822577 mN.

Melbourne-Essendon ATC tower comprises a square, three-storey, steel-framed base clad in square sheets of asbestos cement joined under battens. The base building is surmounted by a cabin in the form of an elongated octagon – it is wider at the north and south – with outward-canted windows. The perimeter of the base structure's roof forms a 360-degree external walkway. A single-storey addition with a skillion roof of sheet metal was added to the east in the late-1960s, to house electronic and radar equipment linked to the new Melbourne Airport at Tullamarine. The windows are generally square or oblong, and quite small, presumably to minimise heat gain, as the building features no sun-shield on any elevation. One exception is a larger square window to the first floor office on the south elevation. This opening has been adapted from an original full-height service entry. The goods entry to the second floor is extant. A steel boom projects approximately one metre from the centre of the lintel. Window frames, balustrades and the steel frame of the cabin are painted a vivid shade of red, a contrast with the pale asbestos cement panels. The steel-framed awning over the ground floor entry, on the south elevation, is a later replacement of an original canted awning. External air conditioning units have been added to the west, north and east elevations. Down pipes to all elevations are later additions. The cabin is raised on an octagonal base, enclosing crawl space and ducting. The walls of the base are clad in vertical box profile sheet metal. The floor of the perimeter walkway is bituminous felt. A section of the walkway perimeter wall at the west end of the north elevation has been removed. In its place, steel piping has been installed as a protective barrier. A modern escape ladder with steel safety hoop is to the east of the south elevation. The cabin's outward canted windows are single-glazed, but may originally have been double glazed, as at the Hobart Tower (1956–58), and as indicated in the 1951 Civil Aviation Journal article. The control cabin has a shallow flat roof supported on the principal glazing bars. The roof, which supports the tower light beacon and antennae, is accessed via a fixed external ladder in the northwest corner of the walkway. The original ladder has been replaced with a steel safety hoop. The roof railing, like the railing on the walkway below, is steel piping. The framing to the tower block includes steel I-beams forming intermediate columns, steel angles at the corners, and a mixture of 3 in × 2 in (76 mm × 51 mm) and 4 in × 1.5 in (102 mm × 38 mm) timber fillers, and 6 in × 2 in (152 mm × 51 mm) floor joists. The vertical I-beams were set into reinforced concrete footings sewn together with a 5 in (130 mm) concrete slab.

=== Interior ===
The ground floor houses a central entry vestibule, with a large equipment room to the east and a secondary equipment room to the northwest. A WC and cleaning facilities, with terrazzo floor and original skirting boards, are to the west. A riser is adjacent to the steep, narrow staircase which runs the full height of the base building. The colour scheme is cream to the walls, with doors, skirting boards and door frames in blue. Light switches are original, as throughout the building. The single-storey addition to the east has a separate entrance to the east.

As constructed, the eastern half of the first floor comprised a single space for Ground Control Approach. It has subsequently been subdivided into two offices by a central timber and glass partition. The decorative scheme in both halves is timber veneer to the walls, with carpet to the timber floor. The original service entry to the south has been modified as a large square window opening. The remainder of the first floor appears intact. The small store off the office in the northwest has brown vinyl to the timber floor boards, possibly original.

The second floor originally comprised "Off Duty" and Air Conditioning rooms to the east, with a locker room in the northwest, next to the stair to the walkway level and cabin above. As existing, the air conditioning room has been extended to the north, reducing the size of the off duty room, which has a modern decorative treatment. The locker room has been adapted as ladies and gents WCs. With the exception of the steel-framed windows, the ATC cabin's fittings and finishes are largely non-original. Roller blinds to each of the tall, single-glazed windows have replaced the original Perspex visor which hung from a circular track attached to the ceiling. The three original vents remain in use, although concealed behind modern cabinetry. An original switch, possibly related to the management of air flow, is extant to the east wall. The modern suspended acoustic ceiling may conceal the original treatment. The present console was installed in September 1967, at the same time as the removal of the original Cossor Radar, a cubicle enclosed by a black curtain, in the south of the cabin. These works, as well as the extension to the east, were carried out as part of an upgrade to ensure operational compatibility with the tower at the new international airport at Tullamarine. The existing console frame has been modified to accommodate contemporary equipment. Note that the 1956 console is held by the nearby Airways Museum, based at Essendon Airport.

=== Integrity ===
The building is relatively intact externally other than for some modifications to original openings and the construction of a large ground floor extension to the east. Internally, there have been a number of alterations, principally to the first and second floors though evidence remains of the original planning and some finishes.

== Heritage listing ==
The Essendon Air Traffic Control (ATC) tower is of historical significance in a national context as an early and relatively rare example of a post-World War II era control tower equipped to an international standard following guidelines devised by the International Civil Aviation Organization (ICAO). It was one of eight Australian ATC towers built to the same operational specifications between 1952 and 1959 in the first major phase of control towers development in the post-World War II period.

Essendon ATC tower is now one of three surviving operational and two decommissioned ATC towers of this period and is now thought to be the earliest surviving example of this group. When commissioned, it formed part of an experimental system for the control of civil aircraft at Melbourne Airport (now known as Essendon Airport), which was at the time one of the busiest airports in the British Empire. This system comprised the air traffic control tower, remote VHF repeater and flight progress board. At the time of its design and installation, the Melbourne Airport system was envisaged as a prototype to be replicated throughout the air routes of eastern Australia.

Essendon Airport Air Traffic Control Tower was listed on the Australian Commonwealth Heritage List on 22 January 2016 having satisfied the following criteria.

Criterion A: Processes

Essendon Air Traffic Control tower is of historical significance for its association with a major programme undertaken in the 1950s by the Australian Government in developing standardised air traffic control facilities across Australia. Essendon is one of three surviving operational (and two decommissioned) ATC towers in Australia – Hobart and Launceston are operational; Tamworth and Adelaide have been decommissioned – built during the 1950s to accommodate equipment and services based on guidelines devised by the International Civil Aviation Organization. It is now thought to be the earliest surviving example of this group. When commissioned it formed part of an experimental system for the control of civil aircraft at Melbourne Airport, which was at the time one of the busiest airports in the British Empire. This system comprised the air traffic control tower, remote VHF repeater and flight progress board. At the time of its design and installation, the system was envisaged as a prototype to be replicated throughout the air routes of eastern Australia.

Criterion B: Rarity

The Essendon ATC tower is a relatively rare example of a standard 1950s ATC tower type.

Criterion D: Characteristic values

The Essendon ATC tower is a representative and relatively intact example of a standard ATC tower type surviving from the 1950s. Other examples are at Launceston, Hobart, Tamworth, and Adelaide. Later towers adopted a similar form as the typology evolved (see Rockhampton, Cairns and the towers of the later 1960s).
