= Flinders Council =

- Local government area
- Interactive map of Flinders Council
- Coordinates: 40.1195°S 148.0977°E
- Country: Australia
- State: Tasmania
- Region: Furneaux Group and surrounding island groups
- Established: 1 January 1907
- Council seat: Whitemark

Government
  - Mayor: Rachel Summers
  - State electorate: Bass
  - Federal division: Bass

Area
  - Total: 1,997 km^{2} (771 sq mi)

Population
  - Total: 987 (2018)
  - Density: 0.5/km^{2} (1.3/sq mi)
- Website: Flinders Council
LGAs around Flinders Council
Bass Strait	South Gippsland (VIC); Bass Strait	Bass Strait
Bass Strait	Flinders Council	Bass Strait
Dorset	Bass Strait	Bass Strait

Flinders Council is a local government body in Tasmania, encompassing the Furneaux Group and nearby islands of Bass Strait, in the north-east of the state. Flinders is classified as a rural local government area and has a population of 987, with Whitemark the main town located on Flinders Island.

== History and attributes ==
The municipality was established on 1 January 1907. Flinders is classified as rural, agricultural and small under the Australian Classification of Local Governments.

=== Geography ===
Flinders covers more than 60 islands off the north-eastern tip of Tasmania at the eastern end of Bass Strait. Of these 60, 12 have permanent populations. The bigger ones are Clarke Island, Cape Barren Island, and the largest and most populous, Flinders Island. The Flinders Council includes the Furneaux Group together with the groups of islands to the north west including Kent Group, Hogan Island Group, Curtis Group, and the Wilsons Promontory Tasmanian Islands (Rodondo, West Moncoeur and East Moncoeur).

Rodondo Island is the westernmost landmass of the council area.

== Council ==
=== Current composition ===
Name	Position	Party
Rachel Summers	Mayor	Independent
Vanessa Grace	Deputy Mayor	Independent
Garry Blenkhorn	Councillor	Independent
Aaron Burke	Councillor	Independent
Carol Cox	Councillor	Independent
Peter Rhodes	Councillor	Independent
Ken Stockton	Councillor	Independent

== Election results ==
=== 2022 ===
2022 Tasmanian local elections: Flinders
Party	Candidate	Votes	%	±%
Independent	Rachel Summers (elected)	251	35.75	
Independent	Carol Denise Cox (elected)	100	14.25	
Independent	Peter Rhodes (elected)	94	13.39	
Independent	Vanessa Grace (elected)	79	11.25	
Independent	Aaron Burke (elected)	50	7.12	
Independent	Garry Blenkhorn (elected)	48	6.84	
Independent	Ken Stockton (elected)	41	5.84	
Independent	Linda Nicol	22	3.13	
Independent	Chris Rhodes	17	2.42	
Total formal votes		702	99.29	
Informal votes		5	0.71	
Turnout		707	84.77	

== Localities ==
- Blue Rocks
- Cape Barren Island
- Emita
- Killiecrankie
- Lackrana
- Lady Barron
- Leeka
- Loccota
- Lughrata
- Memana
- Palana
- Ranga
- Strzelecki
- Whitemark
- Wingaroo

== See also ==
- List of local government areas of Tasmania
