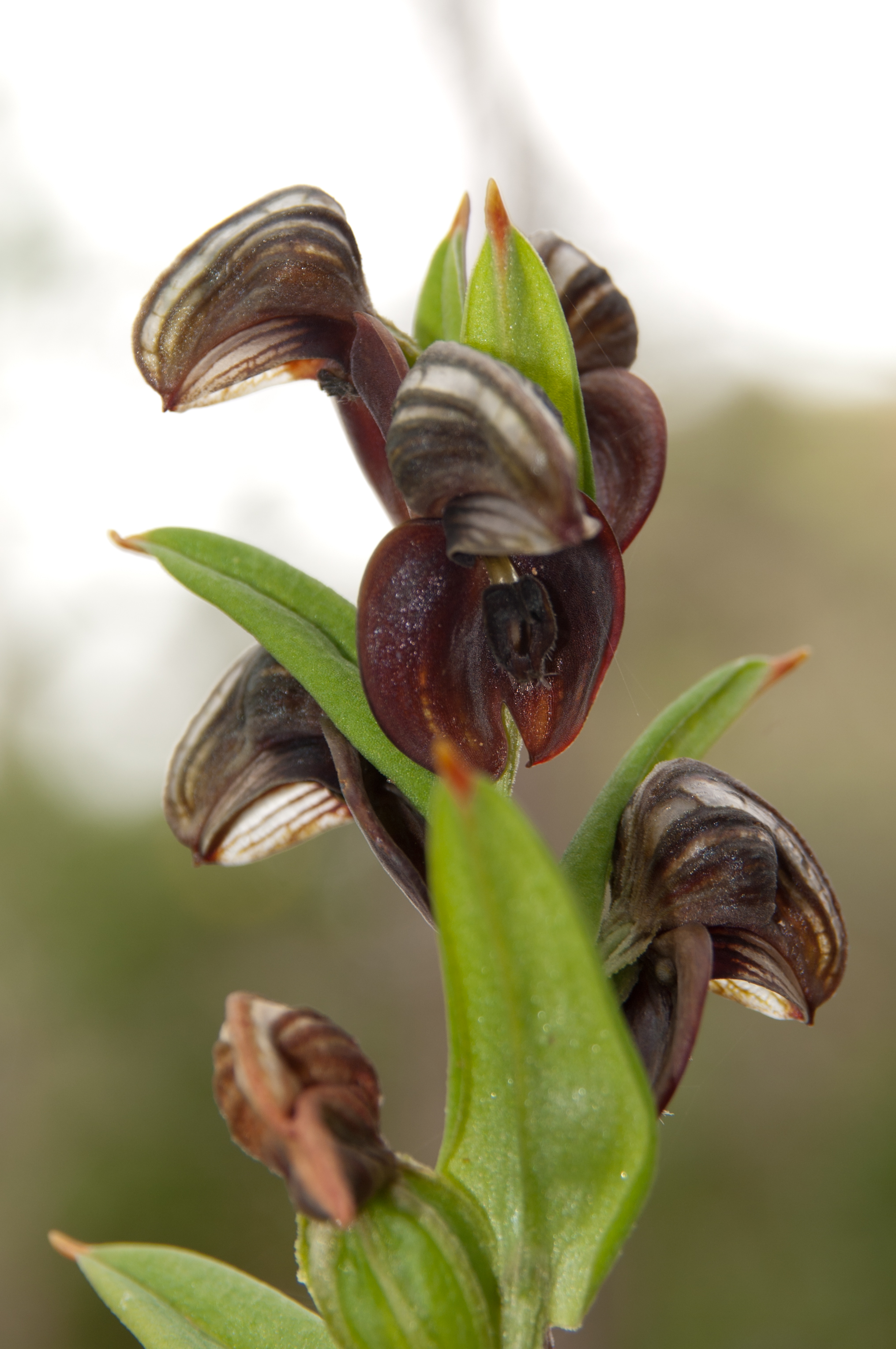

Scientific classification
- Kingdom: Plantae
- Clade: Tracheophytes
- Clade: Angiosperms
- Clade: Monocots
- Order: Asparagales
- Family: Orchidaceae
- Subfamily: Orchidoideae
- Tribe: Cranichideae
- Genus: Pterostylis
- Species: P. sanguinea

Binomial name
- Pterostylis sanguinea D.L.Jones & M.A.Clem.

Synonyms
- Oligochaetochilus sanguineus (D.L.Jones & M.A.Clem.) Szlach.; Urochilus sanguineus (D.L.Jones & M.A.Clem.) D.L.Jones & M.A.Clem.

= Pterostylis sanguinea =

Red-banded greenhood

Species of orchid

Pterostylis sanguinea, commonly known as the red-banded greenhood or dark-banded greenhood, is a plant in the orchid family Orchidaceae and is endemic to southern Australia. The plants either have a rosette of leaves in the years when not flowering or stem leaves on a flowering spike. When flowering, it has up to about twelve flowers which are dark reddish-brown, sometimes green or green and brown with the dorsal sepal and petals joined, forming a hood over the column. It is a common and widespread orchid, found in Western Australia, South Australia, Victoria and, rarely, in Tasmania.

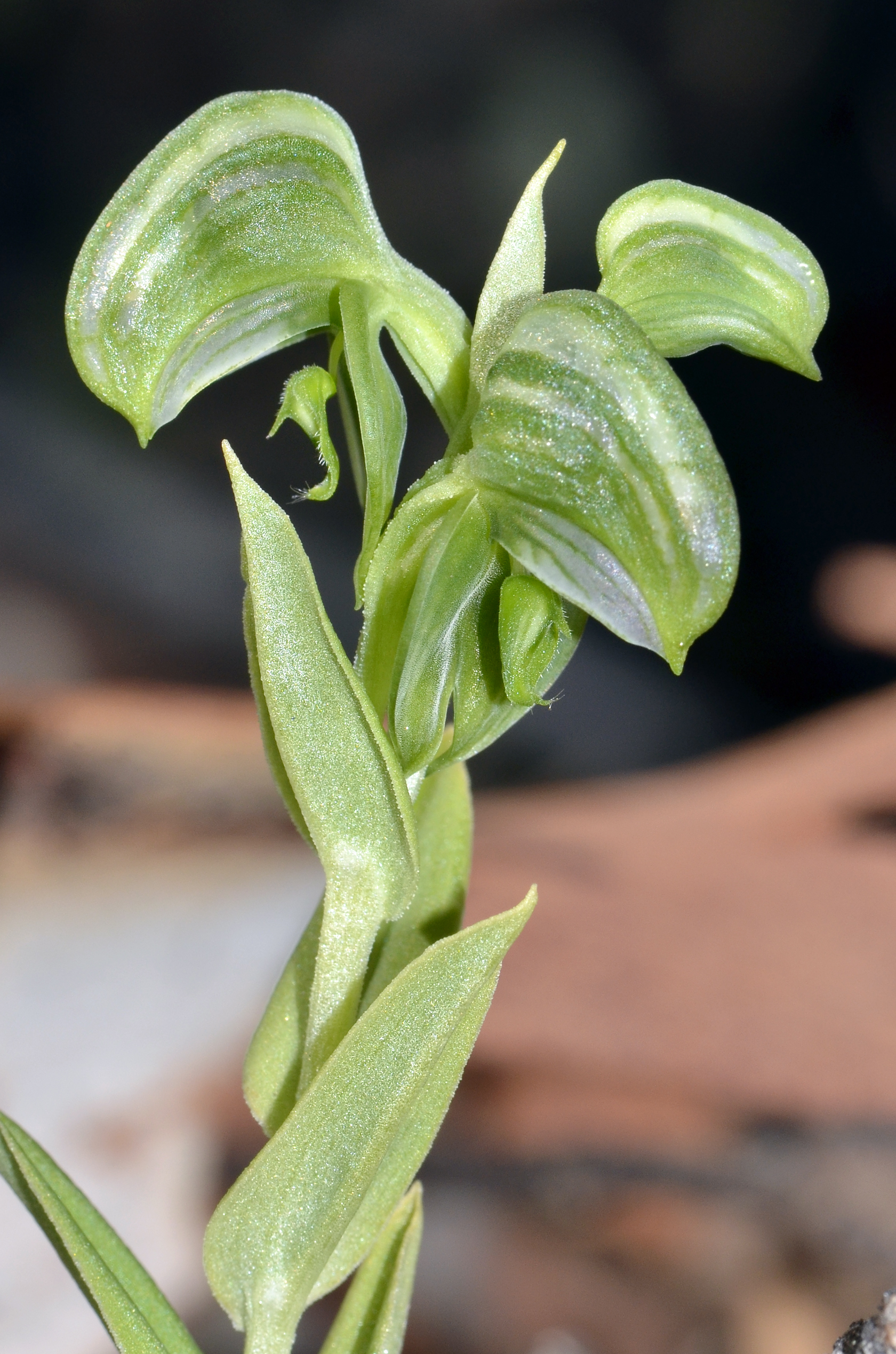
Green form of P. sanguinea

== Description ==
Pterostylis sanguinea, is a terrestrial, perennial, deciduous, herb with an underground tuber. Non-flowering plants have a rosette of between three and ten, linear to lance-shaped leaves, each leaf 20–40 mm (0.8–2 in) long and 6–15 mm (0.2–0.6 in) wide, the leaves on a stem 20–40 mm (0.8–2 in) long. When flowering, there are twelve or more dark reddish-brown, green or green and brown flowers borne on a flowering spike 150–400 mm (6–20 in) high. The flowering spike has between six and ten stem leaves which are 20–50 mm (0.8–2 in) long and 6–12 mm (0.2–0.5 in) wide. The flowers are 15–25 mm (0.6–1 in) long, 12–20 mm (0.5–0.8 in) wide. The dorsal sepal and petals form a hood over the column. The lateral sepals turn downwards, are 11–14 mm (0.4–0.6 in) long, 12–14 mm (0.5–0.6 in) wide and joined for most of their length. The labellum is dark brown, hairy and insect-like, about 6 mm (0.2 in) long, 4 mm (0.2 in) wide and flicks upwards when touched. Flowering occurs from June to September.

== Taxonomy and naming ==
Pterostylis sanguinea was first formally described in 1989 by Mark Clements and the description was published in Australian Orchid Research from a specimen collected in Belair Recreation Reserve (now Belair National Park) in South Australia. The specific epithet (sanguinea) is a Latin word meaning "bloody" or "blood-red" referring to the sometimes blood red colour of the flowers of this species.

== Distribution and habitat ==
Pterostylis sanguinea occurs in Western Australia from north of Kalbarri in the north to Toolinna Cove in the east, in the south-east of South Australia and in disjunct areas of Victoria, west from Yarram. In Tasmania it is only found in the Strzelecki National Park on Flinders Island. It grows in forest and woodland in well-drained soils.

== Conservation ==
Pterostylis sanguinea is classified as "not threatened" by the Government of Western Australia Department of Parks and Wildlife. In Tasmania it is classed as "rare" under the Threatened Species Protection Act 1995.
