= Loccota, Tasmania =

Loccota Tasmania
- Coordinates: 40°13′22″S 148°02′43″E
- Population: 20 (2016 census)
- Postcode(s): 7255
- Location: 17 km (11 mi) S of Whitemark
- LGA(s): Flinders
- Region: North-east
- State electorate(s): Bass
- Federal division(s): Bass
Localities around Loccota:
Bass Strait	Whitemark	Ranga
Bass Strait	Loccota	Strzelecki
Bass Strait	Bass Strait	Bass Strait

Loccota is a rural locality in the local government area (LGA) of Flinders in the North-east LGA region of Tasmania. The locality is about 17 kilometres (11 mi) south of the town of Whitemark. The 2016 census recorded a population of 20 for the state suburb of Loccota.

== History ==
Loccota was gazetted as a locality in 1977. Originally known as Nughata, the name was changed in 1924. Loccota is believed to be an Aboriginal word for “sea-shore”.

== Geography ==
The waters of Bass Strait form the western to southern boundaries.

== Road infrastructure ==
Route C806 (Trousers Point Road) provides access to the locality.
