= Essendon Fields Airport =

Municipal airport serving Melbourne, Victoria, Australia

Essendon Fields Airport Melbourne–Essendon

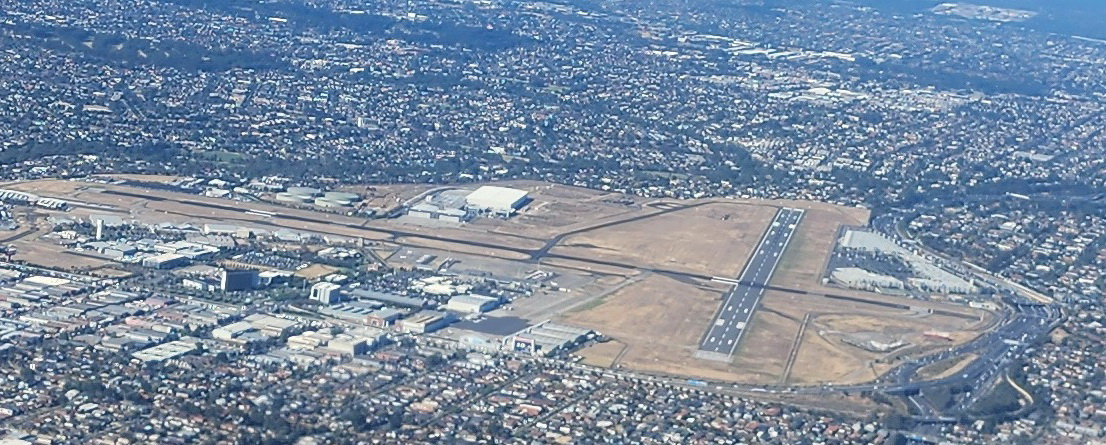

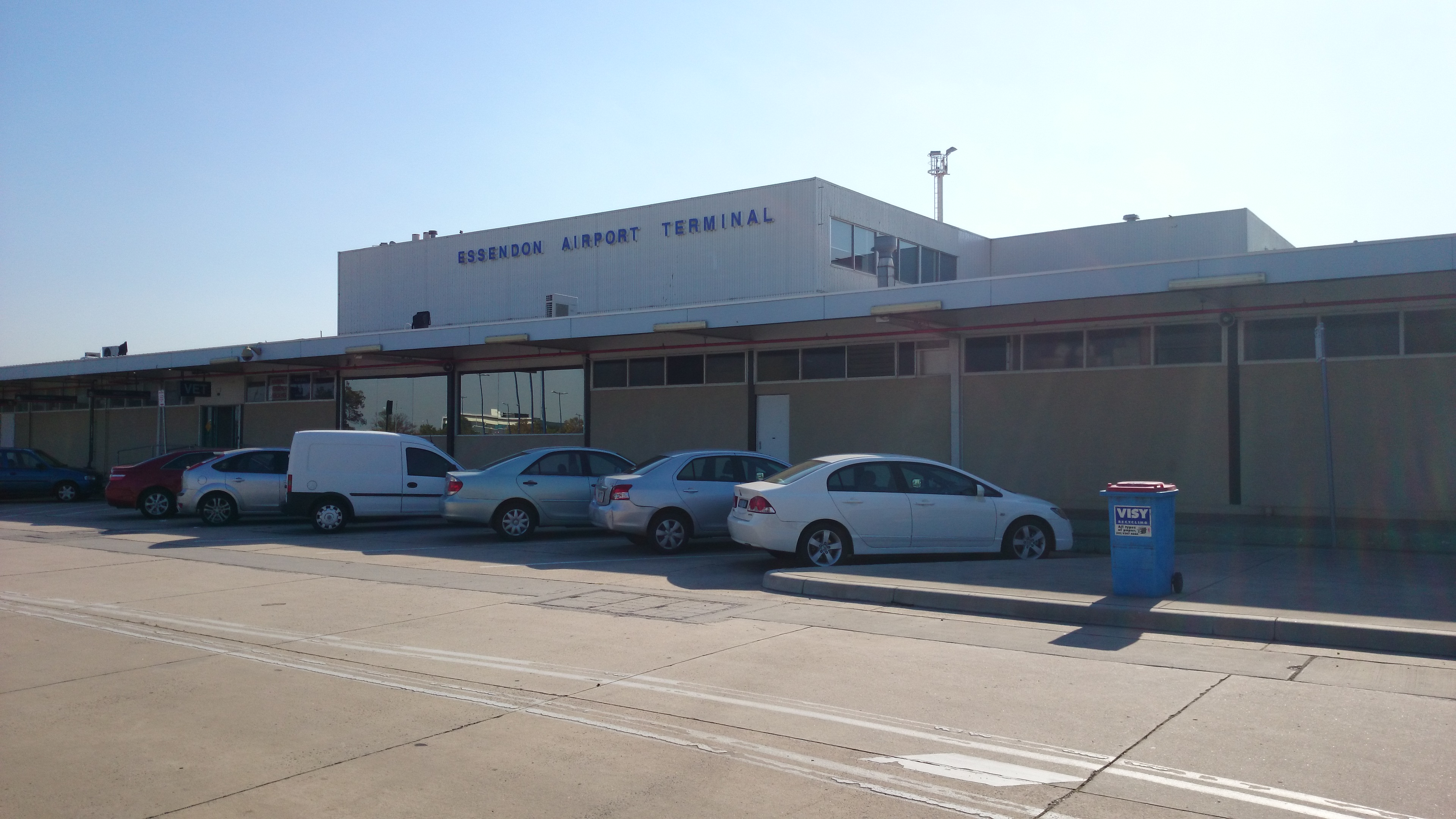
- Essendon Airport terminal building
- IATA: MEB; ICAO: YMEN; WMO: 95866

Summary
- Airport type: Public
- Owner: Andrew Fox and Max Beck
- Operator: Essendon Airport Pty. Ltd.
- Serves: Melbourne
- Location: Essendon Fields, Victoria, Australia
- Opened: 1921; 105 years ago
- Elevation AMSL: 282 ft (86 m)
- Coordinates: 37°43′41″S 144°54′07″E
- Website: www.ef.com.au

Map
- Location within Melbourne Location within Victoria Location within Australia

Runways
Direction	Length		Surface
Direction	m	ft	Surface
08/26	1,921	6,302	Grooved asphalt
17/35	1,504	4,934	Asphalt

Statistics (2006)
- Movements: 60,000+
- Sources: Australian AIP and aerodrome chart Statistics from Essendon Airport

Essendon Fields Airport (IATA: MEB, ICAO: YMEN) (formerly Essendon Airport) is a 305 ha (750 acres) public airport located in the north western suburb of Essendon Fields, approximately 11 kilometres northwest of Melbourne's central business district. The airport occupies approximately 305 hectares and is Melbourne's second largest airport and the closest to the city's centre. From its earliest use in 1921 until 1970 it served as Melbourne's primary international airport, but was replaced by Tullamarine Airport (now Melbourne Airport).

Today, Essendon Fields Airport supports a range of aviation activities including business aviation, charter operations, emergency services, aircraft maintenance, aviation training and helicopter operations. The airport is part of the broader Essendon Fields mixed-use employment precinct, which accommodates commercial, retail, automotive and aviation-related businesses.

== History ==
The area of the airport was originally known as St Johns, after an early landowner. The airport was proclaimed as Essendon Aerodrome by the Commonwealth Government in 1921. For some time prior to proclamation, the aerodrome had been used by the Victorian Chapter of the Australian Aero Club (renamed the Royal Victorian Aero Club), having initially been based at Point Cook. The Aero Club remained at Essendon until the late 1940s when it transferred to Moorabbin Airport.

Originally the airport had grass runways with the first tenants moving in from December 1921, including H.J. Larkin, Captain Matthews, Bob Hart, and Major Harry Shaw.

The 1920s period saw the great pioneering aviation flights of Sir Charles Kingsford Smith who visited the airport on several occasions. On 16 August 1926 70,000 people swarmed across the grassy fields of Essendon Aerodrome upon the arrival of aviation pioneer Alan Cobham when he landed his de Havilland DH.50 floatplane, flown from England to Australia.

Essendon Aerodrome was the location of the first parachute jump by a woman in Australia. On 21 November 1937 Jean Burns, a seventeen year old member of the Aero Club, leapt from a DH4 in front of a crowd of hundreds of people and landed in a nearby paddock.

The Aerodrome was extended with additional land during the 1930s. Further construction of the runways was undertaken in 1946: at the request of the Commonwealth, the Country Roads Board (later VicRoads) undertook the construction to upgrade and lengthen the original north–south grass runway to concrete tarmac, 4,800 feet (1,500 m) in length by 150 feet (46 m) wide. On completion of the north–south runway, a new east–west runway, 6,100 feet (1,900 m) in length by 200 feet (61 m) wide was constructed. Owing to non-availability of cement however, this runway was constructed in flexible-type pavement, primed and sealed with bitumen.

=== Melbourne Airport (1950–1970) ===
Essendon became Australia's second, and Melbourne's first, international airport in February 1950. The airport was renamed Melbourne Airport, and the first international commercial flight arrived from New Zealand a year later. In the 1950s Essendon Airport was too small for the larger pure jets, such as the Boeing 707. The airport was surrounded by housing and expansion was impossible.

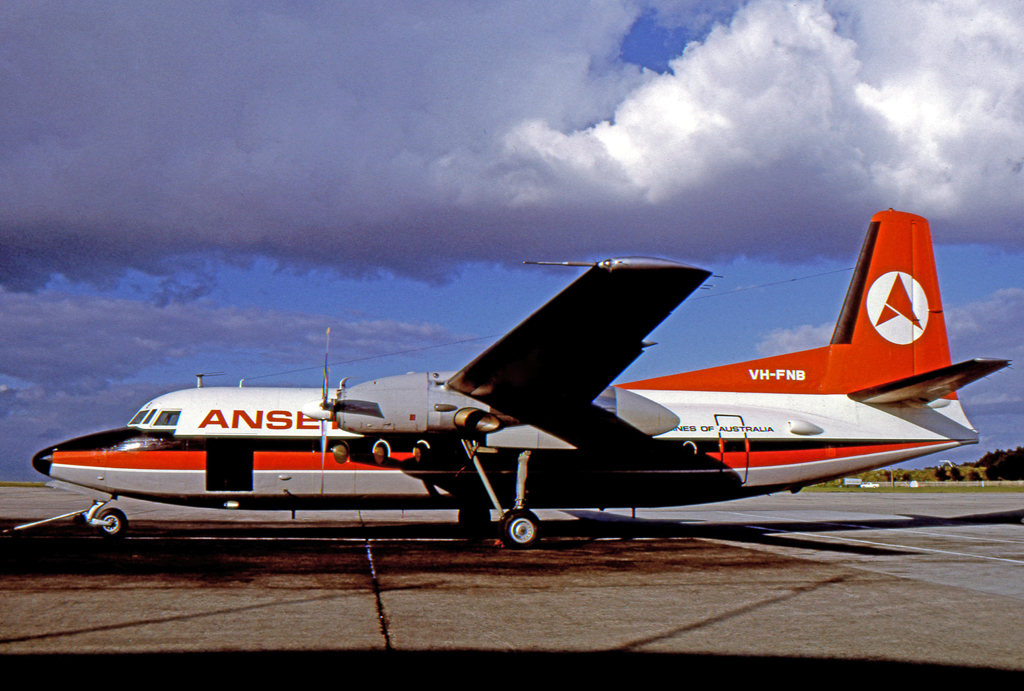
Fokker F27 Friendship of Ansett Airlines at Essendon Airport in 1970

In 1959 Cabinet approved the acquisition of 2,167 ha (5,350 acres) in Tullamarine for the purpose of a new international airport, which began construction in the 1960s and was ready to handle aircraft by 1967, but not passenger flights. At this time, Essendon was no longer named Melbourne Airport, with the new airport rapidly taking shape. Commercial international flights were transferred to the new airport in 1970, with commercial domestic flights following the next year.

The major passenger airlines using Essendon in the postwar years until scheduled air services were transferred to Tullamarine were Ansett Airlines and Trans Australia Airlines.

A variety of aircraft were used through Essendon in the 1960s – Lockheed L-188 Electras; Vickers Viscounts; Fokker F27 Friendships; Douglas DC-3s, DC-4s, and DC-6s; de Havilland Comets, and from 1964, Boeing 727s. Douglas DC-9s were introduced later in the decade.

International flights departed mainly from Sydney during Essendon's years of operation, and there were regular daily flights between the two largest metropolitan areas in Australia.

Some notable arrivals at the airport include:

- 1964 – The Beatles, upon arrival, waved to thousands of teenagers from the viewing deck of Essendon Airport's main terminal building.
- 1967 – United States President Lyndon B. Johnson for the memorial service of Prime Minister Harold Holt. Johnson's aircraft Air Force One landed at Essendon Airport on 22 December 1967 then flew empty to Tullamarine as its weight when refuelled was too heavy for Essendon's tarmac.
- 1972 – Sir Robert Helpmann co-directed with Rudolf Nureyev, The Australian Ballet film of Don Quixote in F hangar.
- 1987 – Kylie Minogue filmed her first-ever music video for her debut single Locomotion here.

=== Post 2000 ===
In 2001, the Commonwealth Government sold its management rights for the airport to Edgelear Pty. Ltd., a consortium of the Linfox transport group owned by transport tycoon Lindsay Fox (which also operates Avalon Airport), and the Becton group of companies, owned by the Beck family. Executive, corporate, and privately owned aircraft are based at the airport, along with charter, freight, and regional Victorian airlines who currently operate from the airport as well as flight training and engineering schools. The airport also provides warehousing facilities, and a home to the Victorian Air Ambulance, Royal Flying Doctor Service and the Victoria Police Air Wing.

In 2007, the airport was re-designed under a new master plan, as part of the Essendon Fields development. This master plan caters to the future of the site for both aviation and non-aviation use. A new access road and off-ramp were constructed from the Tullamarine Freeway to enter the airport precinct from the north, rather than the common Matthews Avenue entry point. This necessitated the construction of an Aero-Crossing as the new access road crossed a taxiway.

The airfield itself also has undergone a major upgrade with the installation of lighting and signage systems to bring the airport to International Civil Aviation Organization standards. There are now taxiway signs, and the taxiway and runway lighting has been upgraded to new units. The runway lighting is now medium intensity on runway 17/35 and upgraded to high intensity on 08/26. This alleviates the loss of the approach lighting system previously. Also during this upgrade, the old Fixed Distance Lighting and Visual Approach Slope Indicator systems were decommissioned and replaced with new Precision Approach Path Indicator systems on the left side of all runways.

In November 2007 Essendon Fields Airport released its 2007 master plan. The master plan detailed further proposals to expand aviation activities. These plans were opposed by a local residents' group "Close Essendon Airport" and local political representatives Kelvin Thomson MP and Judy Maddigan. A competing group known as "Save Essendon Airport" was formed and led by Lincoln Robinson and wanted the airport to stay open for air ambulance, aircraft charter, and aircraft maintenance services. Within one week the group had more than 500 members and over 2,000 signatures on a petition. Shortly after its launch and lobbying the then Government announced that the airport would remain.

Essendon Fields 2013 Master Plan was approved on 23 April 2014 by then Deputy Prime Minister Warren Truss. Master Plan 2013 outlined the direction and vision of Essendon Fields Airport for the period 2013 to 2033, with the aim to create more jobs, increase community benefit and provide a greater vision for the next 20 years.

=== Recent history ===
In November 2017, the airport was renamed from Essendon Airport to Essendon Fields Airport, reflecting the name of the suburb it is situated in. In 2019, the renovation of the airport terminal was completed. It was the first major renovation since the airport opened in 1959.

The Essendon Airport Air Traffic Control Tower is listed on the Commonwealth Heritage List.

=== Current Operations ===
Following the relocation of Melbourne's primary airline services to Tullamarine Airport in 1970, Essendon Fields Airport evolved into a centre for general aviation, business aviation and aviation-support industries. Today the airport accommodates a mix of corporate aircraft, charter services, helicopter operators, aviation maintenance organisations and training providers.

The airport serves as an operational base for emergency and essential aviation services, including air ambulance and police aviation operations. Helicopter activity forms a significant component of airport movements.

The airport has undergone substantial investment since privatisation, including the development of new hangars, maintenance facilities and terminal upgrades. Recent developments have included purpose-built facilities for aircraft maintenance, servicing and aviation training organisations.Global jet manufacturers Bombardier and Textron Aviation (Cessna and Beechcraft) have established maintenance, repair and overhaul facilities on site.

=== Accidents and incidents ===
- On 18 May 1942, a United States Army Air Forces Consolidated LB-30 Liberator crashed on landing at Essendon airfield. The Liberator had earlier taken off from Essendon when smoke was observed in the cockpit, prompting the pilot to return the aircraft to the airfield. One person was killed when he fell out of the nose wheel doors after the crash landing. The aircraft subsequently burst into flames. The rest of the crew members suffered burns but escaped alive.
- On 31 January 1945, a heavily modified Stinson Model A registered VH-UYY and named Tokana, operated by Australian National Airways, departed from Essendon Airport for the daily flight to Kerang. On board were eight passengers and two pilots. About twenty minutes later the aircraft broke up in mid-air, killing all on board. The aircraft had suffered fatigue failure of its left wing. The accident investigators believed this was the first crash of an aircraft due to metal fatigue.
- On 10 July 1978, a Partenavia P.68 on a training flight crashed shortly after taking off from Essendon Airport with three people on board. Six people on the ground were killed and one seriously injured; and the three occupants of the aircraft were also seriously injured.
- On 3 September 1986, a Cessna 402 air ambulance aircraft crashed shortly after taking off from Essendon airport with six on board. All six were killed after the aircraft burst into flames upon crashing to the ground in what is today the suburb of Gowanbrae.
- On 3 December 1993, a de Havilland DH.104 Dove on a charter dinner flight crashed in a suburban street shortly after taking off from the airport with ten people on board. Five occupants of the aircraft suffered serious injuries and one person on the ground suffered minor injuries. Six houses were damaged in the crash.
- On 21 February 2017, a Beechcraft B200 King Air bound for King Island crashed into the DFO Essendon shopping centre in the airport grounds at 8:59 am shortly after taking off, killing all five people on board. The shopping centre wasn't due to open until 10 am.

== Airlines and destinations ==
One airline operates scheduled passenger flights from Essendon Airport and there are numerous charter operators.

Airlines	Destinations
Sharp Airlines	Flinders Island, King Island

== Other operators ==
- GAM Air
- Royal Flying Doctor Service
- Ambulance Victoria
- Victoria Police Air Wing

== Ground transport ==
Tram route 59 provides a regular service to Airport West and Flinders Street, with the Earl Street stop located just a few hundred metres from the passenger terminal.

== See also ==
- List of airports in the Melbourne area
- Transport in Australia
- United States Army Air Forces in Australia (World War II)
- List of airports in Victoria
