= Strzelecki National Park =

National park in Australia

- IUCN category II (national park)
- Location within Tasmania
- Interactive map of Strzelecki National Park
- Location: Tasmania
- Nearest city: Flinders Island, Tasmania
- Coordinates: 40°13′10″S 148°05′41″E
- Area: 42.16 km^{2} (16.28 sq mi)
- Established: 1967
- Governing body: Tasmania Parks and Wildlife Service
- Website: Official website

Strzelecki National Park is a national park on Flinders Island, Tasmania (Australia), 307 km north of Hobart. The park is home to abundant wildlife including more than one hundred bird species, wombats, and potoroos. It is named after Sir Paul Edmund Strzelecki, a famous Polish explorer and geologist who made a lot of his explorations on the Australian continent and was proclaimed in 1967.

== Popular activities in the park ==
Strzelecki National Park contains the highest point on Flinders Island, Mount Strzelecki, after which it is named; the park contains multiple hiking trails and scenic peaks. The park also contains scenic beaches that are popular spots for swimming, snorkeling, fishing, and kayaking. Additionally, there is a diverse spread of biomes in the park ranging from Tasmanian Blue Gum Forests to coastal headlands, and the sprawling mountains. It was the also first peak climbed in the Three Peaks Race.

== See also ==
- Protected areas of Tasmania (Australia)
