= Blue Rocks, Tasmania =

Township in Tasmania, Australia

Coordinates: 40°03′28″S 147°57′12″E

Blue Rocks (Australian postcode 7255) is a small township on the mid western coast of Flinders Island, Tasmania, Australia. Blue Rocks Post Office opened around 1936 and closed in 1969.
