= Flinders Island =

Island to the north of Tasmania, Australia

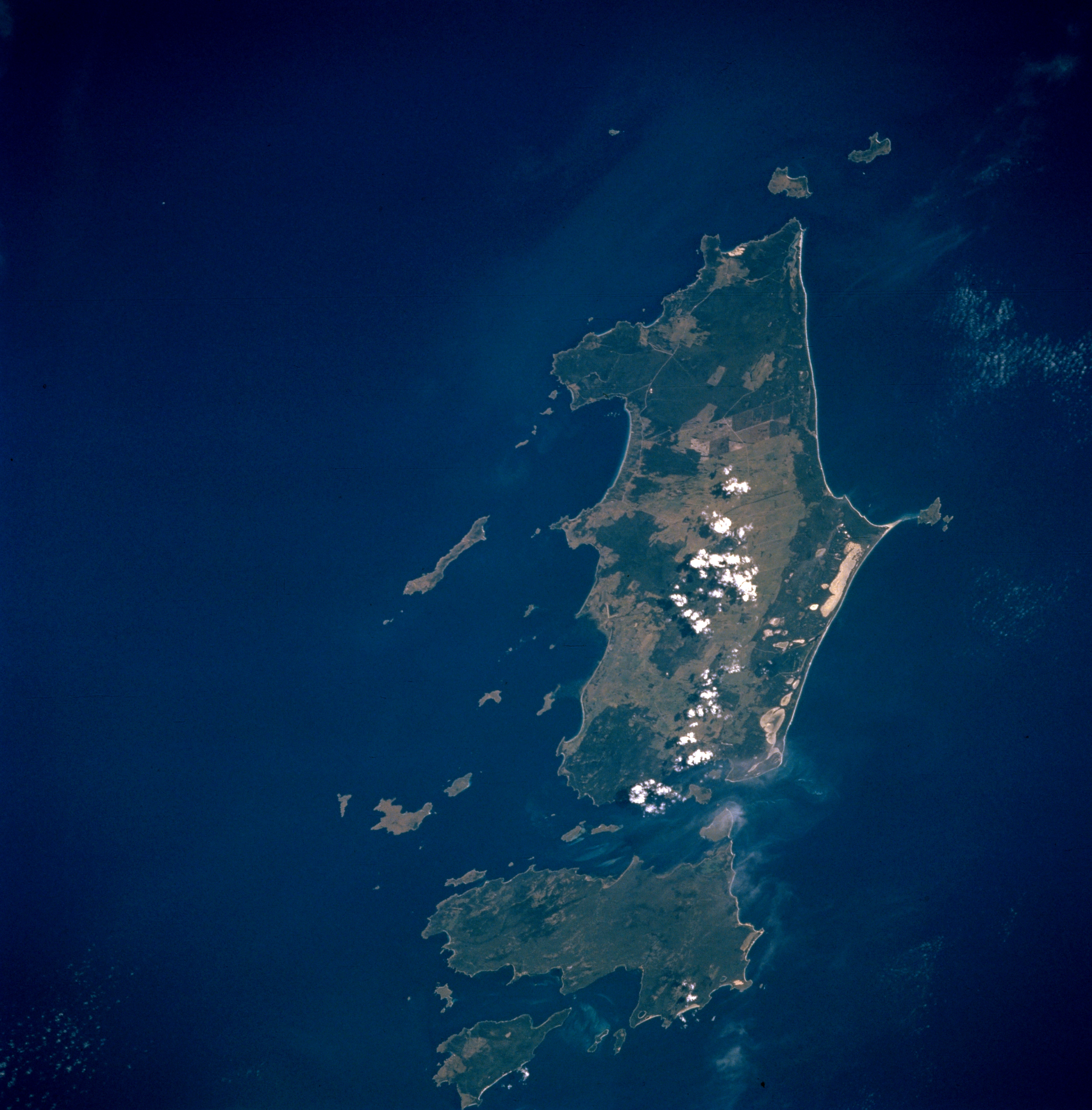
- The Furneaux Group as viewed from space, April 1993

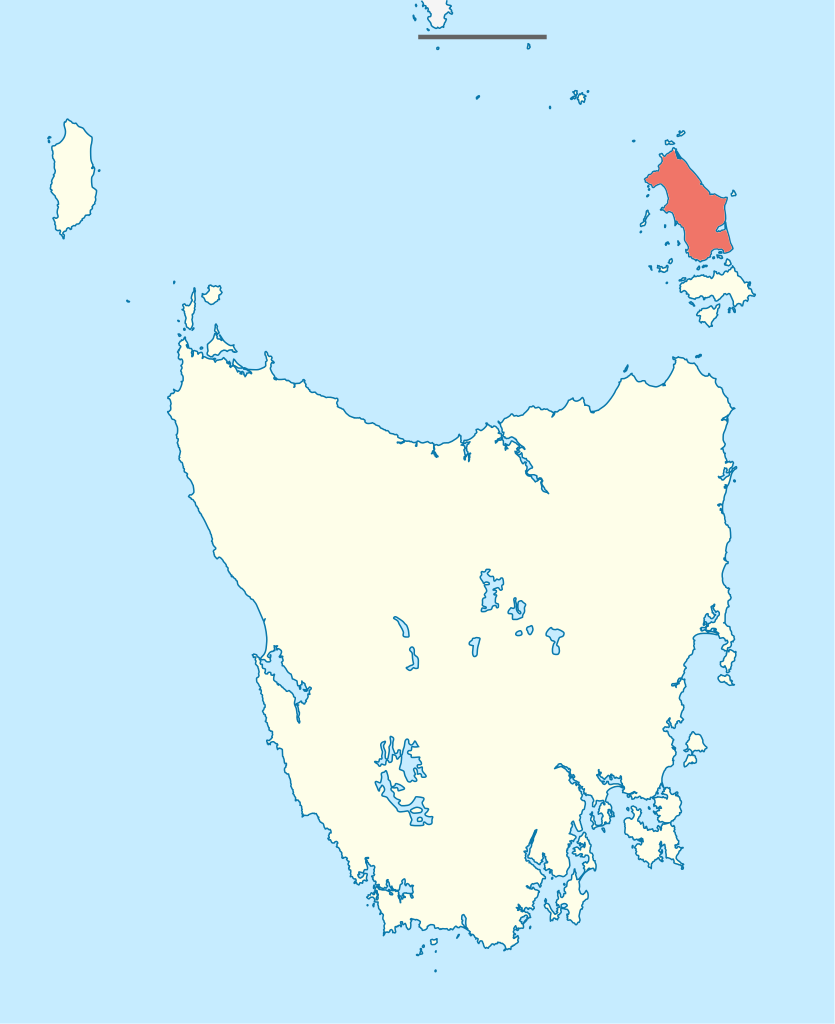
- Flinders Island, as shaded, located in the Bass Strait
- Etymology: Matthew Flinders

Geography
- Location: Bass Strait
- Coordinates: 40°00′S 148°03′E
- Archipelago: Furneaux Group
- Area: 1,367 km^{2} (528 sq mi)
- Area rank: 2nd in Tasmania
- Length: 62 km (38.5 mi)
- Width: 37 km (23 mi)
- Highest elevation: 756 m (2480 ft)
- Highest point: Mount Strzelecki

Administration
- Australia
- State: Tasmania
- LGA: Municipality of Flinders Island
- Largest settlement: Whitemark (pop. 170)

Demographics
- Population: 922 (2021)
- Pop. density: 0.673/km^{2} (1.743/sq mi)

Additional information
- Official website: visitflindersisland.com.au

Flinders Island, the largest island in the Furneaux Group, is a 1,367-square-kilometre (528 sq mi) island in the Bass Strait, northeast of the island of Tasmania. Today Flinders Island is part of the state of Tasmania, Australia. It is 54 kilometres (34 mi) from Cape Portland and is located on 40° south, a zone known as the Roaring Forties.

== History ==
=== Prehistory ===
Flinders Island was first inhabited at least 35,000 years ago, when people made their way from Australia across the then land-bridge which is now Bass Strait. A population remained until about 4,500 years ago, succumbing to thirst and hunger following an acute El Niño climate shift.

=== European arrival ===
Some of the south-eastern islands of the Furneaux Group were first recorded in 1773 by British navigator Tobias Furneaux, commander of HMS Adventure, the support vessel with James Cook on Cook's second voyage. In February 1798, British navigator Matthew Flinders charted some of the southern islands, using one of the schooner Francis' open boats. Later that year, Flinders returned and finished charting the islands in the Norfolk; he then went on to complete the first circumnavigation of Tasmania (1798–99), accompanied by George Bass, proving Tasmania to be an island separated from the Australian mainland by Bass Strait, later named in honour of George Bass.

=== Etymology ===
James Cook named the islands Furneaux's Islands, after Tobias Furneaux. Flinders named the largest island in the group "Great Island". He also named a group of mountains on Flinders Island, the "Three Patriarchs". The small island just to the east, Flinders named "Babel Island" from the noises made by the seabirds there. Phillip Parker King later named the largest island Flinders Island, after Matthew Flinders. Flinders named Mount Chappell Island after his wife Ann née Ann Chappelle. There are three islands named "Flinders' Island"—the large island on the east side of Bass Strait, named by Phillip Parker King; an island in the Investigator Group of South Australia, named by Matthew Flinders after his young brother Samuel Flinders (midshipman on the Investigator); and an island in the Flinders Group north of Cooktown, Queensland was named after Matthew Flinders.

=== Settlement ===
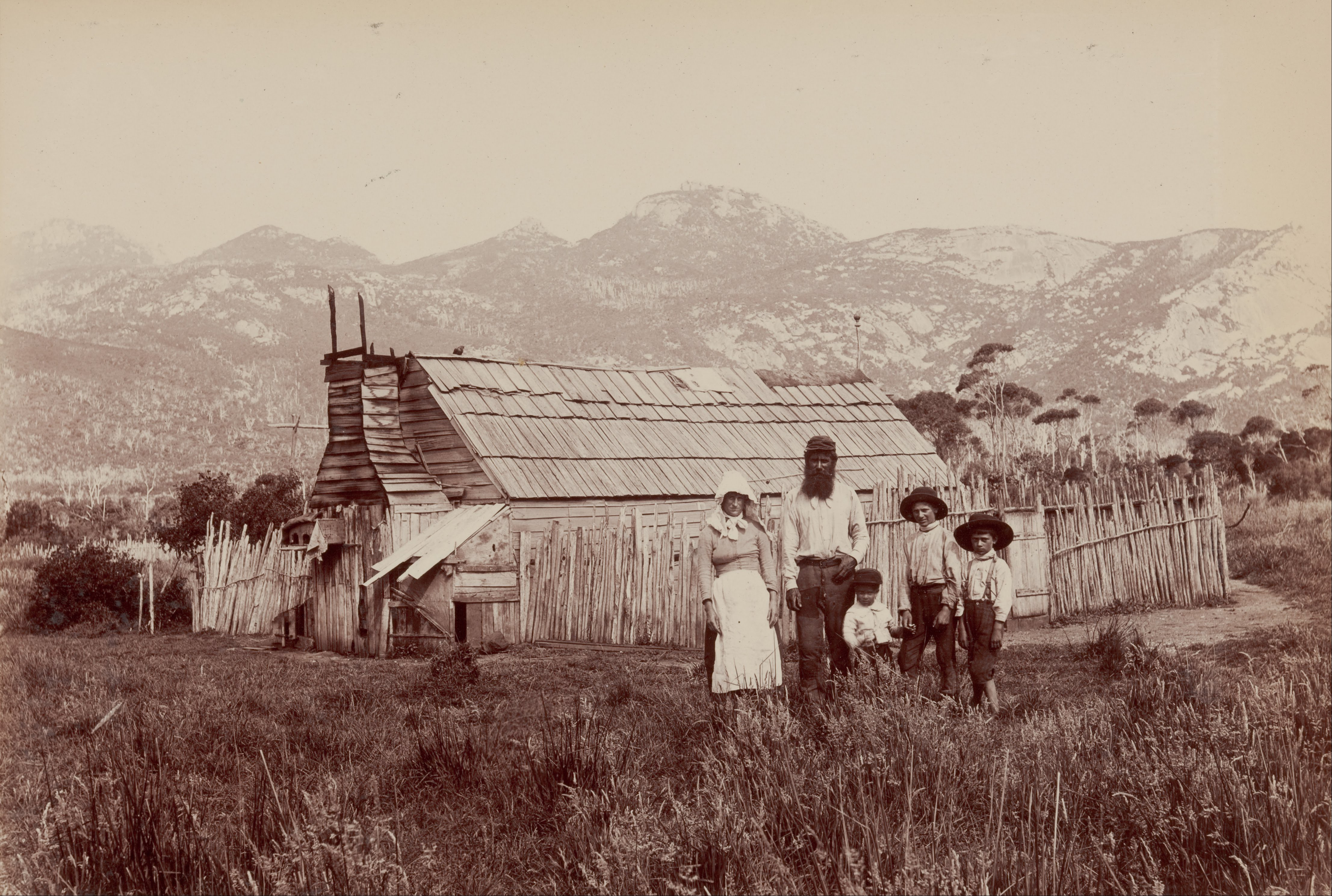
A family on Flinders Island, 1893, by A.J. Campbell

In the late 18th century, the island was often frequented by sealers and Aboriginal women, the majority of whom had been kidnapped from their mainland tribes. Seal stocks soon collapsed, causing the last sealing permit to be issued in 1828. Many sealers' families chose to stay in the Furneaux Group, subsisting on cattle grazing and muttonbirding.

==== Wybalenna Aboriginal Establishment ====
From 1831, the remnants of the Tasmanian Aboriginal population were exiled firstly to "The Lagoons" just south of what is now the town of Whitemark, and then in 1833 to the Wybalenna Aboriginal Establishment at Settlement Point. Wybalenna is translated as "dwellings" or more colloquially "Black Man's Houses" from the language of the Ben Lomond people. These ~180 survivors were deemed to be safe from white settlers here, but conditions were poor with around 130 Aboriginal people dying at Wybalenna alone. This forced relocation scheme was therefore short-lived.

In 1847, after a campaign by the Aboriginal population against their commandant, Henry Jeanneret, which involved a petition to Queen Victoria, the remaining 47 Aboriginal people were again relocated, this time to Oyster Cove Station, an ex-convict settlement 56 kilometres south of Tasmania's capital, Hobart. Land on the neighbouring Cape Barren Island was formally reserved for the Aboriginal community in 1881.

==== Soldier settlement schemes ====
From the late 19th century freehold land was given out, but it was not until the 1950s that a proper settlement scheme was initiated, mainly drawing settlers from mainland Tasmania and central New South Wales to Flinders Island's eastern shore. The Municipality of Flinders Island was instituted in 1903.

== Geography and nature ==
The island forms part of the state of Tasmania, and part of the Municipality of Flinders Island local government area. Flinders Island is only one of the many islands included in the Municipal area. Of these islands Flinders Island is the only island with more than one permanent settlement, and is by far the largest in the Furneaux Group.

The island is about 62 kilometres (39 mi) from north to south, and 37 kilometres (23 mi) from east to west. with a total land area of 1,333 square kilometres (515 sq mi). Mount Strzelecki in the south west is the island's highest peak at 782 metres (2,566 ft). About a third of the island is mountainous and rugged with ridges of granite running the length of the island. The coastal areas are dominated by sandy deposits often taking the shape of dunes. Many coastal lagoons punctuate the eastern shore, formed by dunes blocking further drainage. This drainage is mainly provided by many small streams, few of them permanently flowing directly leading to the waters of Bass Strait or such a lagoon.

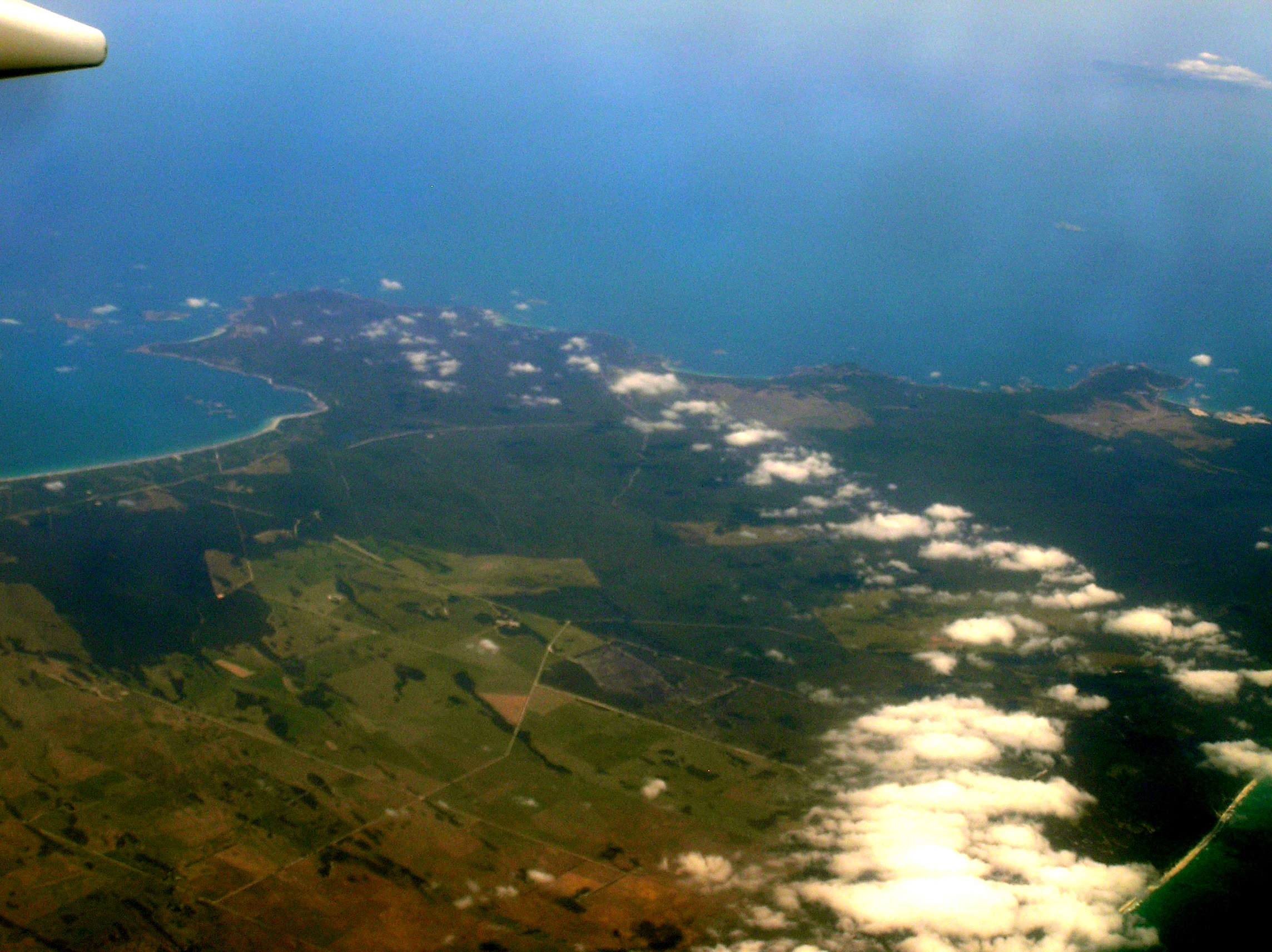
Aerial view of the northwest of Flinders Island

The coastal areas are mainly covered in scrub or shrubs, whereas the vegetation at a higher elevation consists of woodland, mainly eucalyptus species. The total number of plant species in the Furneaux Group well exceeds 800, showing the great biodiversity of its ecosystem. Native bird species include the Cape Barren goose (Cereopsis novaehollandiae) and the short-tailed shearwater (Puffinus tenuirostris). Marsupial mammals are represented by Bennett's wallaby (Macropus rufogriseus), brushtail possum (Trichosurus vulpecula), eastern pygmy possum (Cercartetus nanus), potoroo (Potorous apicalis), common ringtail possum (Pseudocheirus peregrinus) and Tasmanian pademelon (Thylogale billardierii). The cape fur seal (Arctocephalus pusillus) is the sole placental mammal commonly found on Flinders. It is the only remaining habitat of a subspecies of common wombat, V. u. ursinus, which is listed as vulnerable by the Environment Protection and Biodiversity Conservation Act 1999 and IUCN Red List. The area surrounding Mount Strzelecki in the south west of the island constitutes Strzelecki National Park. The island also supports a population of feral turkeys (Meleagris gallopavo).

=== Climate ===
Flinders Island has a mild oceanic climate (Cfb) that is strongly moderated by the Bass Strait. The summers are drier and less cloudy than the winters, and annual average rainfall totals less than 800 mm (31 in).

Climate data for Flinders Island Airport (1991–2020 normals, extremes 1942–present)
| Month | Jan | Feb | Mar | Apr | May | Jun | Jul | Aug | Sep | Oct | Nov | Dec | Year |
|---|---|---|---|---|---|---|---|---|---|---|---|---|---|
| Record high °C (°F) | 41.5 (106.7) | 39.4 (102.9) | 35.6 (96.1) | 31.7 (89.1) | 27.4 (81.3) | 20.3 (68.5) | 21.4 (70.5) | 22.7 (72.9) | 29.5 (85.1) | 32.7 (90.9) | 35.9 (96.6) | 40.5 (104.9) | 41.5 (106.7) |
| Mean daily maximum °C (°F) | 22.6 (72.7) | 22.7 (72.9) | 21.4 (70.5) | 18.7 (65.7) | 16.3 (61.3) | 14.3 (57.7) | 13.6 (56.5) | 13.9 (57.0) | 15.3 (59.5) | 17.0 (62.6) | 18.9 (66.0) | 20.7 (69.3) | 18.0 (64.4) |
| Mean daily minimum °C (°F) | 13.9 (57.0) | 14.1 (57.4) | 12.6 (54.7) | 10.6 (51.1) | 9.0 (48.2) | 7.1 (44.8) | 6.7 (44.1) | 6.8 (44.2) | 7.8 (46.0) | 8.7 (47.7) | 10.5 (50.9) | 12.3 (54.1) | 10.0 (50.0) |
| Record low °C (°F) | 2.6 (36.7) | 4.0 (39.2) | 1.6 (34.9) | −0.4 (31.3) | −1.7 (28.9) | −2.5 (27.5) | −3.5 (25.7) | −3.0 (26.6) | −2.5 (27.5) | −1.4 (29.5) | 0.5 (32.9) | 2.5 (36.5) | −3.5 (25.7) |
| Average precipitation mm (inches) | 52.9 (2.08) | 32.3 (1.27) | 40.4 (1.59) | 50.6 (1.99) | 62.8 (2.47) | 68.3 (2.69) | 66.0 (2.60) | 72.5 (2.85) | 58.9 (2.32) | 47.2 (1.86) | 55.9 (2.20) | 57.0 (2.24) | 668.3 (26.31) |
| Average precipitation days (≥ 0.2 mm) | 8.1 | 7.3 | 8.5 | 11.6 | 14.6 | 15.9 | 17.0 | 17.3 | 14.5 | 12.3 | 10.0 | 10.2 | 147.3 |
| Mean monthly sunshine hours | 238.7 | 220.4 | 220.1 | 183.0 | 148.8 | 117.0 | 142.6 | 192.2 | 192.0 | 223.2 | 228.0 | 244.9 | 2,350.9 |
Source: Bureau of Meteorology

| Days over 30 °C (86 °F): | 4.8 |
| Days over 35 °C (95 °F): | 0.8 |
| Days under 2 °C (35.6 °F): | 21.1 |
| Days under 0 °C (32 °F): | 5.6 |
| Average Annual Windspeed: | 21–25 km/h (13–15 mi/h) |

=== Central Flinders Island Important Bird Area ===
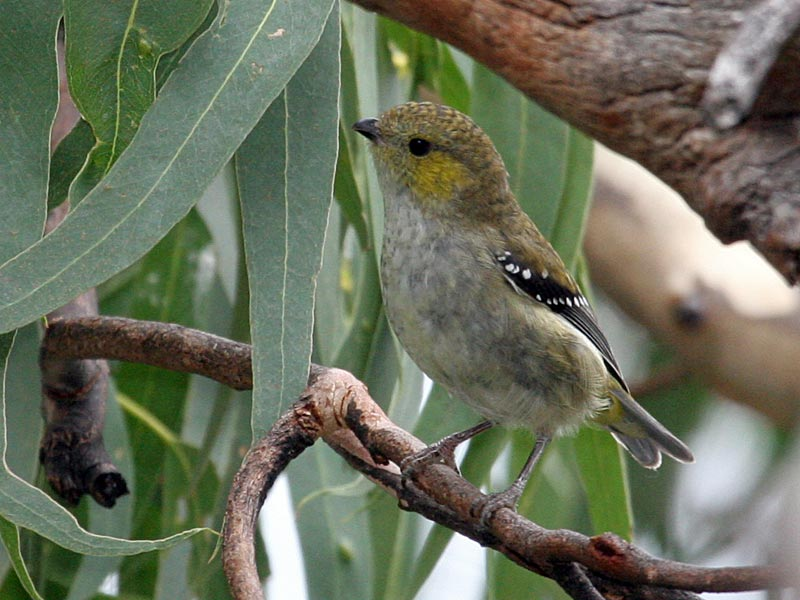
Flinders Island is an important site for the forty-spotted pardalote

A 30 km^{2} tract of land on the island, lying mainly to the north and east of Whitemark, has been identified as an Important Bird Area (IBA) because it contains three breeding colonies of the endangered forty-spotted pardalote and habitat used by flame robins. It also supports populations of several of Tasmania's restricted-range endemic bird species, including the green rosella, yellow-throated honeyeater, black-headed honeyeater, strong-billed honeyeater, Tasmanian thornbill, black currawong and dusky robin.

=== Eastern Flinders Island Important Bird Area ===
A 187 km^{2} strip of land extending the full 70 km length of Flinders Island's eastern coastline has also been identified as an IBA. it supports small numbers of fairy terns, large numbers of hooded plovers and over 1% of the world populations of chestnut teal, pied oystercatchers and sooty oystercatchers.

== Demographics ==
The population in 2011 was 700 people; the median age being 45.

Settlements include Whitemark (which has the island's main airstrip and about 155 inhabitants (2011) and Lady Barron (approx. 110 inhabitants), Blue Rocks, Killiecrankie, Wingaroo and Wybalenna (all below Lady Barron's population figure).

The 2016 census shows that the population is rising. The population of the Local Government Area, i.e. Flinders and Cape Barren Islands is 906; up from 776 in the 2011 Census and to 1010 in 2019.

The population of the 7255 postal code area, i.e. Flinders, is 833 up from 702 in 2011, a rise of over 16% for the Municipality and over 18% for Flinders over the 5-year period.

The median age of people in the Municipality has risen from 52 to 53, and the number of families has increased from 218 to 243.

== Communications ==
As of 4 October 2010, Sharp Airlines has been operating services between Essendon, Flinders Island and Launceston. Using 19-seat Metroliners, they fly between Essendon Airport and Flinders Island Airport three return flights a week (65 minutes) and Launceston Airport and Flinders Island Airport at least daily (25 minutes). The Tasmanian Aeroclub, Kirkhope Aviation and Vortex Air also offer charter services between Launceston, Flinders Island and Victoria (as well as surrounding Islands).

A ferry service delivering food and perishable goods is operated to the island weekly by Furneaux Freight between Bridport, Tasmania and Lady Barron, Tasmania and also monthly from Port Welshpool, Victoria.

Australian telecom provider Telstra offers the only mobile phone service on the island, providing 4G coverage across both Flinders and Cape Barren Island.

Internet access is limited to either a satellite dish connection or to use the 4G network.

== See also ==
- List of islands of Tasmania
