= Whitemark =

Whitemark Tasmania
- Coordinates: 40°07′17″S 148°00′58″E
- Population: 308 (2021 census)
- Postcode(s): 7255
- LGA(s): Flinders Council
- Region: North-east
- State electorate(s): Bass
- Federal division(s): Bass
| Mean max temp | Mean min temp | Annual rainfall |
| 17.8 °C; 64 °F | 9.9 °C; 50 °F | 730.3 mm 28.8 in |
Localities around Whitemark:
| Blue Rocks | Memana | Memana |
| Bass Strait | Whitemark | Lackrana |
| Bass Strait | Ranga, Loccota | Ranga |

Whitemark is a rural residential locality on Flinders Island in the local government area (LGA) of Flinders in the North-east LGA region of Tasmania. The 2021 census recorded a population of 308 for the state suburb of Whitemark. It is the main settlement of Flinders Island.

== Buildings ==
Whitemark has a local pub, called the Flinders Island Interstate Hotel. It also has a post office, a supermarket, a bakery, a petrol station, a mechanic, an Anglican church and a library as well as small local produce businesses.

== History ==
Whitemark was gazetted as a locality in 1970. The name may be derived from a conspicuous white mark placed by an early surveyor. Whitemark Post Office opened around 1902.

The Hydro Tasmania developed power supply for the settlement in the 1980s.

The local newspaper was the Island News from 1954 to 2004.

== Geography ==
The waters of Bass Strait form the western and south-western boundaries.

=== Climate ===
Whitemark has an oceanic climate (Köppen: Cfb), with tepid, somewhat dry summers and cool, wetter winters. Average maxima vary from 22.7 °C (72.9 °F) in February to 13.4 °C (56.1 °F) in July while average minima fluctuate between 13.8 °C (56.8 °F) in February and 6.4 °C (43.5 °F) in July. Mean average annual rainfall is moderate, 730.3 mm (28.75 in) spread over 158.8 days, and concentrated in winter. The town is not very sunny, with 108.6 cloudy days and only 47.6 clear days per annum. Extreme temperatures have ranged from 41.5 °C (106.7 °F) on 29 January 2009 to −3.5 °C (25.7 °F) on 28 July 1976. Climate data was sourced from Flinders Island Airport, 3.7 kilometres (2.3 mi) northwest of Whitemark.

Climate data for Whitemark (40º05'24"S, 148º00'00"E, 9 metres or 30 feet AMSL; 1962–2024 normals and extremes, rainfall since 1942)
| Month | Jan | Feb | Mar | Apr | May | Jun | Jul | Aug | Sep | Oct | Nov | Dec | Year |
|---|---|---|---|---|---|---|---|---|---|---|---|---|---|
| Record high °C (°F) | 41.5 (106.7) | 39.4 (102.9) | 35.6 (96.1) | 31.7 (89.1) | 27.4 (81.3) | 20.3 (68.5) | 21.4 (70.5) | 22.7 (72.9) | 29.5 (85.1) | 32.7 (90.9) | 35.9 (96.6) | 40.5 (104.9) | 41.5 (106.7) |
| Mean daily maximum °C (°F) | 22.3 (72.1) | 22.7 (72.9) | 21.4 (70.5) | 18.8 (65.8) | 16.3 (61.3) | 14.1 (57.4) | 13.4 (56.1) | 13.8 (56.8) | 15.2 (59.4) | 16.9 (62.4) | 18.7 (65.7) | 20.4 (68.7) | 17.8 (64.1) |
| Mean daily minimum °C (°F) | 13.6 (56.5) | 13.8 (56.8) | 12.7 (54.9) | 10.8 (51.4) | 9.0 (48.2) | 7.1 (44.8) | 6.4 (43.5) | 6.7 (44.1) | 7.7 (45.9) | 8.7 (47.7) | 10.3 (50.5) | 12.0 (53.6) | 9.9 (49.8) |
| Record low °C (°F) | 2.6 (36.7) | 4.0 (39.2) | 1.6 (34.9) | −0.4 (31.3) | −1.7 (28.9) | −2.5 (27.5) | −3.5 (25.7) | −3.0 (26.6) | −2.5 (27.5) | −1.4 (29.5) | 0.5 (32.9) | 2.5 (36.5) | −3.5 (25.7) |
| Average rainfall mm (inches) | 46.4 (1.83) | 38.2 (1.50) | 49.5 (1.95) | 57.8 (2.28) | 76.9 (3.03) | 72.4 (2.85) | 79.8 (3.14) | 74.9 (2.95) | 61.4 (2.42) | 59.8 (2.35) | 54.5 (2.15) | 57.3 (2.26) | 730.3 (28.75) |
| Average rainy days (≥ 0.2 mm) | 8.7 | 8.0 | 9.8 | 12.6 | 15.8 | 17.0 | 18.3 | 18.0 | 14.9 | 13.9 | 11.3 | 10.5 | 158.8 |
| Average afternoon relative humidity (%) | 61 | 62 | 63 | 67 | 73 | 74 | 74 | 71 | 70 | 67 | 65 | 64 | 68 |
| Average dew point °C (°F) | 12.3 (54.1) | 13.1 (55.6) | 12.1 (53.8) | 10.6 (51.1) | 9.8 (49.6) | 8.2 (46.8) | 7.4 (45.3) | 7.1 (44.8) | 7.8 (46.0) | 8.7 (47.7) | 10.0 (50.0) | 11.2 (52.2) | 9.9 (49.8) |
| Mean monthly sunshine hours | 238.7 | 220.4 | 220.1 | 183.0 | 148.8 | 117.0 | 142.6 | 192.2 | 192.0 | 223.2 | 228.0 | 244.9 | 2,350.9 |
| Percentage possible sunshine | 53 | 57 | 58 | 55 | 48 | 42 | 48 | 59 | 54 | 55 | 53 | 53 | 53 |
Source: Bureau of Meteorology (1962–2024 normals and extremes, rainfall since 1942)

== Road infrastructure ==
Route B85 (Palana Road / Lady Barron Road) passes through from north-west to south.
