= List of Walkley awards won by The Australian =

List of Walkley awards won by The Australian is a list of Walkleys won by journalists while writing for the national Australian newspaper The Australian.

== Walkleys ==
Year	Section	Award	Journalist	Story
2001	All Media	Business Reporting	Mark Westfield	Insider – Uncovering the HIH Disaster
2001	All Media	Commentary, Analysis, Opinion & Critique	Paul Kelly	Various
2001	All Media	Coverage of Centenary of Federation	Jennifer Campbell, Petra Rees & Simon Pipe	Centenary of Federation
2001	All Media	Coverage of the Asia-Pacific Region	Donald Greenlees	The Smugglers
2001	Print	Three Headings	Seumas Phelan	Heads you win
2001	Senior Journalism Awards	Journalistic Leadership	Paul Kelly	
2002	All Media	Commentary, Analysis, Opinion & Critique	Patrick Smith	The Moral Game
2002	Artwork	Cartoon	Bill Leak	Brown Nose Day
2002	Print	3 Headings	Seumus Phelan	Ahead of the Best
2003	All Media	Business Journalism	Geoff Elliott	The Collapse of New Tel
2003	Artwork	Editorial Graphics And Design	Sturt Krygsman	Uncle Sam Gets Mad
2003	Artwork	Editorial Graphics And Design	Simon Pipe	9.11.01 – A Shock To History
2003	Print	Three Headings	Tom Phelan	Trio Grande
2004	All Media	Commentary, Analysis, Opinion & Critique	Patrick Smith	Colour of Money
2004	Artwork	Editorial Graphics And Design	The Australian Design and Graphics Team	The Australian Megagraphics Series
2004	Photography	Daily Life Photography & Portrait Photography	Brett Faulkner	Mungo Moonrise
2004	Print	Three Headings	Ian Gunn	Heads and Tales
2005	All Media	Business Journalism	Michael West	Allstate
2005	All Media	Cartoon	Eric Lobbecke	No Cheap Route to Defence
2005	Photography	Nikon-Walkley Australian Press Photographer Of The Year	Renee Nowytarger	
2005	Print	Magazine Feature Writing	Mark Whittaker	Ordinary Heroes
2006	All Media	Coverage of Indigenous Affairs	Ashleigh Wilson and Nicholas Rothwell	Aboriginal Art
2006	All Media	Investigative Journalism	Caroline Overington	AWB Kickback Scandal
2006	Photography	Daily Life/Feature Photography	Renee Nowytarger	A Day in the Life of Prisoners in the Navotas Prison
2007	All Media	Business Journalism	Anthony Klan	Fincorp Collapse
2007	Print	Artwork	Sturt Krygsman	The Shakey Sheik
2007	Print	Print News Report	Hedley Thomas	Dr Haneef
2008	Print	Cartoon	John Kudelka	Welcome to Brendan
2008	Print	News Report	Tony Koch and Padraic Murphy	No Jail for Rape of Girl, 10
2009	Photography	Nikon-Walkley Australian Press Photographer Of The Year	Renee Nowytarger	
2009	Print	Best Cartoon	Peter Nicholson	Bashir and Bombing
2009	Print	News report	Gary Hughes	Black Saturday 1 & 2
2010	All Media	Outstanding Continuous Coverage of an Issue or Event	Stephen Fitzpatrick	Sri Lankan asylum seeker stand-off
2010	Print	Best Artwork	Eric Lobbecke	Rudd's dangerous climate retreat
2011	All Media	Sustained coverage of an issue or event	Natasha Bita	Virus in the system
2011	Photography	Daily Life/Feature Photography	Stuart McEvoy	Cyclone Yasi – Maria Domandi
2013	All Media	International	Amanda Hodge	No place called home/ Taliban shadow on gangster's paradise in Pakistan/ Indian rape family speaks out for justice
2014	All Media	Artwork	Eric Lobbecke	Chopper Hockey
2014	Print/Text	Print/Text News Report	Paul Maley and Greg Bearup	That's my boy: kids witness war's horror/Plotter's nephew in Syrian combat/Aussie fighters leading extremist PR: ASIO
2016	All Media	Coverage of Indigenous Affairs	Eric George and Stephen Fitzpatrick	Bowraville murders
2016	Radio/Audio	Documentary, Feature, Podcast or Special	Eric George and Stephen Fitzpatrick	Bowraville Podcast
2018	All Media	Cartoon & Artwork.	Jon Kudelka	From the Heart
2018	All Media	Investigative Journalism	Hedley Thomas and Slade Gibson	The Teacher's Pet
2018	Radio/Audio	Feature	Kylie Stevenson, Caroline Graham and Eric George	Lost in Larrimah

== Gold Walkleys ==
Year	Journalist	Story	Notes
1997	Mary-Louise O'Callaghan	The Sandline Crisis	Coverage of the Sandline affair
2007	Hedley Thomas	Dr Haneef	Investigation into the false arrest of Muammed Haneef on terrorism charges
2009	Gary Hughes	Black Saturday 1 & 2	Coverage of the Black Saturday bushfires
2018	Hedley Thomas and Slade Gibson	The Teacher's Pet	Podcast Investigating the disappearance of Lynette Dawson
