= Church Point Ferry =

Australian ferry company

Church Point Ferry provides ferry services from Church Point, situated on Pittwater in the northern suburbs of Sydney, New South Wales, Australia.

The ferry provides an hourly service to Scotland Island and Ku-ring-gai Chase, where it stops at Halls Wharf, Lovett Bay and Elvina Bay.
