= Bayview, New South Wales =

Bayview
- Suburb
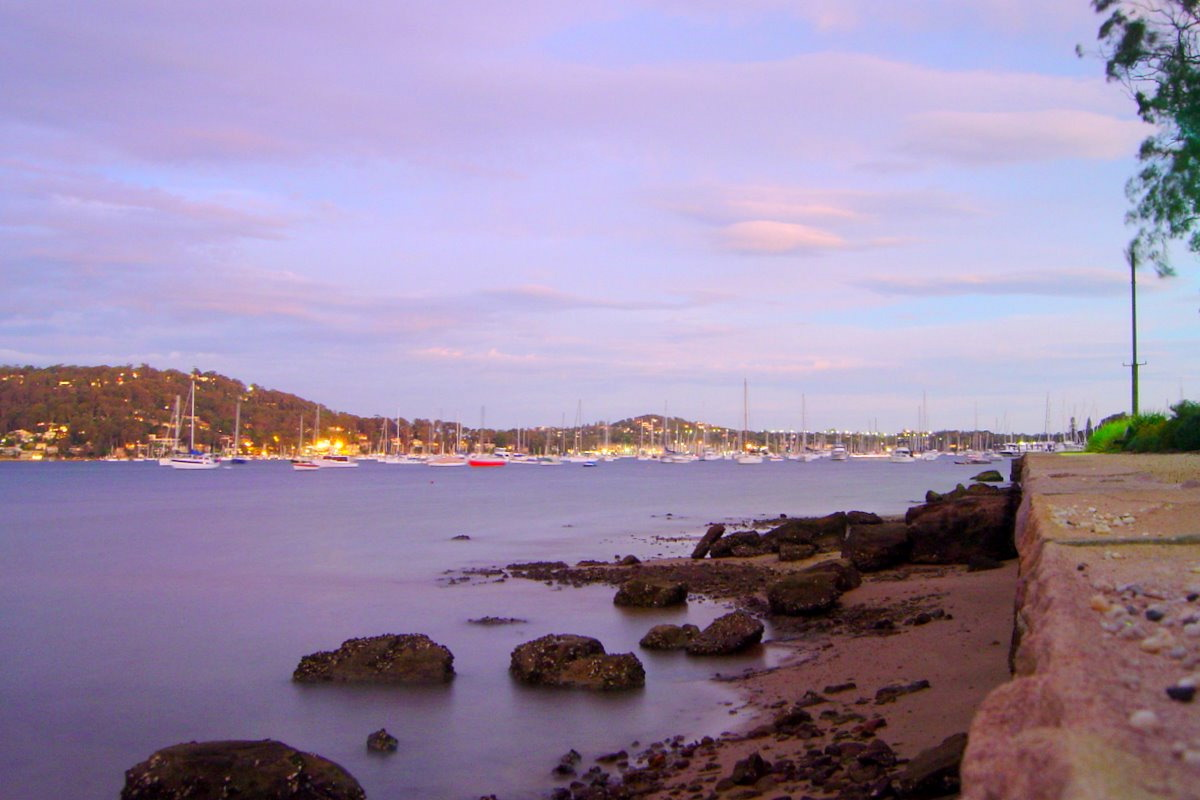
- Bayview

- Interactive map of Bayview
- Country: Australia
- State: New South Wales
- City: Sydney
- LGA: Northern Beaches Council
- Location: 31 km (19 mi) north of Sydney CBD

Government
  - State electorate: Pittwater
  - Federal division: Mackellar
- Elevation: 104 m (341 ft)

Population
  - Total: 3,807 (SAL 2021)
- Postcode: 2104
Suburbs around Bayview
Church Point	Scotland Island	Clareville
Ku-ring-gai Chase National Park	Bayview	Newport
Ingleside	Mona Vale	Mona Vale

Bayview is a suburb in Sydney's Northern Beaches region, in the state of New South Wales, Australia 31 kilometres north of the Sydney central business district, in the local government area of Northern Beaches Council.

Bayview is a hilly suburb, bounded by Pittwater to the north; Mona Vale to the east and south; and Church Point, Kuringai Chase and Ingleside to the west.

== History ==
Bayview takes its name from a description of its location, providing a "view" across "Pittwater". Governor Arthur Phillip took a short journey of exploration from Manly to this area in March 1788 and named it Pitt Water after William Pitt the Younger, the prime minister of the United Kingdom at the time. Captain John Hunter prepared a map showing the bays and inlets in 1792.

One of the first settlers was Patrick Bryan, who built a house in 1821 on the current site of the Bayview Golf Links.

A number of tetrahedron tank traps can be found off Pittwater Road on the water side in Bayview. These tank traps are a little-known remnant of WWII defence along Sydney's Northern Beaches.

== Demographics ==
=== Birthplace ===
According to the 2021 census, there were 3,807 residents in Bayview. 67.4% of residents were born in Australia, with the next most common countries of birth being England (11.5%), New Zealand (1.9%), South Africa (1.8%), Germany (1.0%), and China (excluding Special Administrative Regions and Taiwan) (0.9%).

=== Languages ===
In the 2021 census, 88.5% of residents spoke only English at home, the next most common languages spoken at home included Mandarin (1.0%), Dutch (0.7%), German (0.6%), French (0.6%), and Spanish (0.6%). The most common responses for religious affiliation were No Religion (38.5%), Anglican (22.7%), Catholic (19.8%), and Uniting Church (3.4%); a further 5.0% of respondents elected not to disclose their religion.

=== Dwellings ===
Of the occupied private dwellings in Bayview 56.9% were separate houses, 23.3% were semi-detached and 19.5% were flats or apartments.

== Schools ==
- St Luke's Grammar School (formerly Loquat Valley Anglican Preparatory School) – Anglican Co-educational day school for children from Pre-Kindergarten to Year 6

== Commercial and marinas ==
Bayview is primarily a residential area with limited commercial space.

Bayview is home to Australia's largest yacht importer, and largest yacht share fleet and Pittwater's largest yacht charter fleet.

There are currently two privately owned floating marinas (Gibson Marina and Bayview Anchorage Marina) with attached yacht selling/renting companies and NSW Maritime offices. On the marinas there are a few kiosks and restaurants.

Between the marinas is Bayview Yacht Racing Association (BYRA), used commonly by local school students for their popular learn-to-sail programs.

== Parks ==
Bayview is a pet friendly neighbourhood and is home to a number of parks among the most loved in the Northern Beaches:

- Bayview Baths (which features a Swimming Enclosure)
- Bayview Park
- Bimbimbie Place Reserve
- Ilya Avenue Reserve
- Kamilaroi Park
- Kennedy Park
- Minkara Reserve
- Pindari Park
- Riddle Reserve
- Rowland Reserve

The most well-known being Roland Reserve, an open field dog park.

The importance of parks within the Bayview is the preservation of Spotted Gum Forests considered to be of nature conservation significance at State level and provides habitat for the threatened Glossy Black-cockatoo as well as provides habitat for birds, frogs, mammals, reptiles and acts as a stepping stone between larger areas of habitat due to its diversity.

== Boat ramps ==
Bayview boasts the following boat launching:

- Rowland Reserve two concrete ramps 14.4m x 20m.
- Bayview Park one concrete ramp 10.8m x 4m.
- Riddle Reserve one concrete ramp 3m x 10m near dinghy storage and one concrete ramp 3m x 11m beside BYRA Yacht Club.
- Maybanke Cove one concrete ramp 3m x 10m near dinghy storage.

== Golf clubs ==
Bayview is home to the Bayview Golf Course, an 18-hole course with a clubhouse in Mona Vale.

== Notable residents ==
- Chris Dawson – Former professional Rugby League player with the Newtown Jets, and convicted murderer of Lynette Dawson.
