= Bendigo and Adelaide Bank =

Australian financial institution

Bendigo and Adelaide Bank Limited

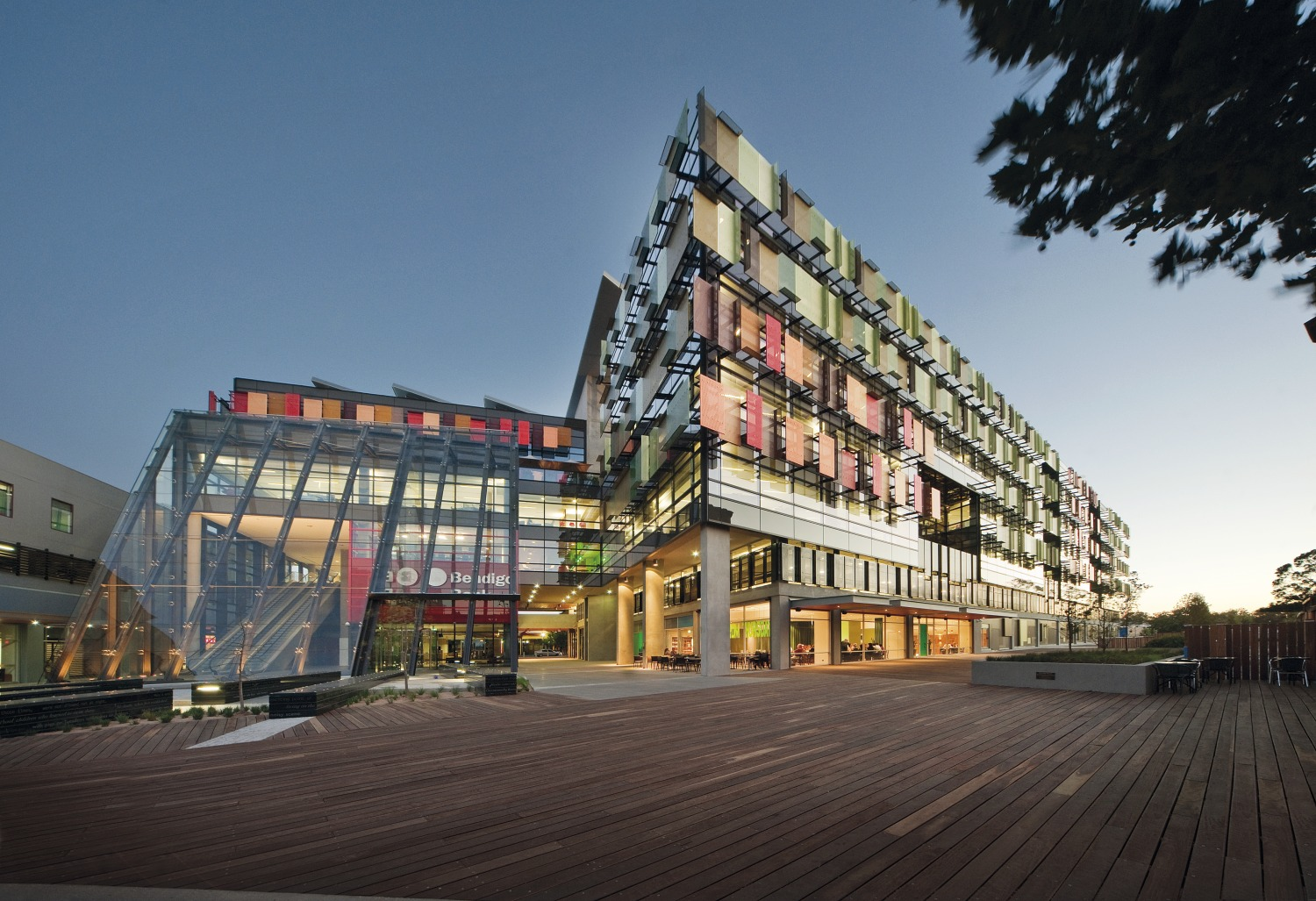
- Bendigo Bank headquarters in Bendigo
- Type: Public
- Traded as: ASX: BEN; S&P/ASX 200 component
- Industry: Financial services
- Founded: 9 July 1858; 168 years ago
- Headquarters: Bendigo, Victoria, Australia
- Key people: Richard Fennell (CEO and MD); Vicki Carter [Independent Chair]
- Services: Banking, financial and related services
- Net income: ▼ A$488.1 million (2022)
- Total assets: ▲ A$95.24 billion (2022)
- Total equity: ▲ A$6.71 billion (2022)
- Subsidiaries: Up Money
- Website: bendigobank.com.au

Bendigo and Adelaide Bank (trading as Bendigo Bank), is an Australian financial institution, operating primarily in retail banking. The company was formed by the merger of Bendigo Bank and Adelaide Bank in November 2007.

Prior to the merger, Bendigo Bank operated nearly 900 outlets across Australia, including over 160 company-owned branches, 220 community-owned Community Bank branches, 100 agencies, and 400 Elders outlets. The bank's branches were mainly located in Victoria and Queensland. Post-merger, the combined bank operates more than 400 branches.

The bank's national headquarters are in Bendigo, Victoria with a major office in Adelaide, South Australia and corporate offices in Melbourne, Victoria, as well as Sydney, New South Wales and Ipswich, Queensland.

== History and development ==
The company started in 1858 as a fixed-term (terminating) building society to improve conditions in the Bendigo goldfields during the Victorian gold rush.

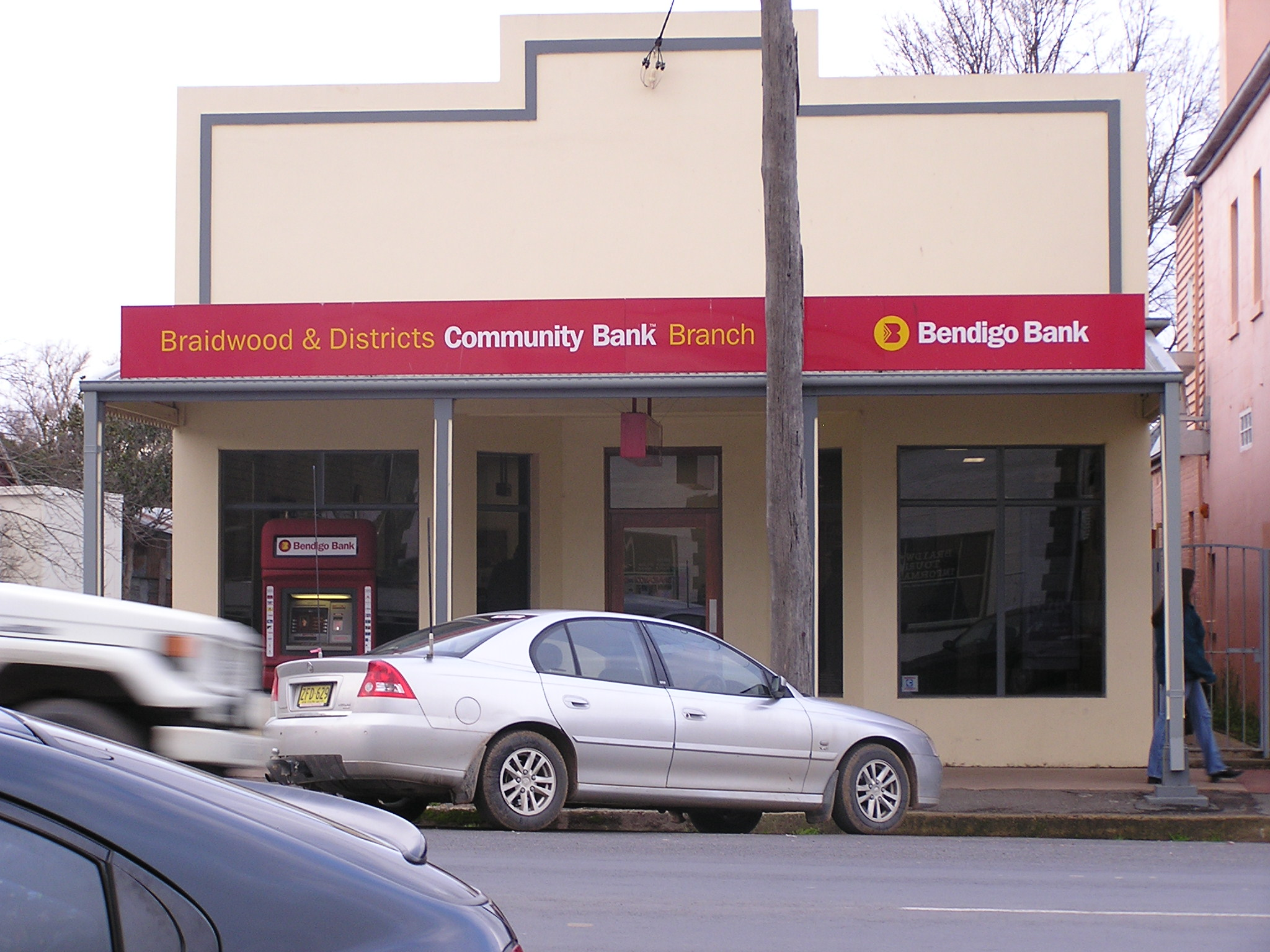
Bendigo Bank Community branch in Braidwood, New South Wales, Australia

At seven years old, in 1865, the company restructured, taking the name Bendigo Mutual Permanent Land and Building Society, which incorporated in Victoria 11 years afterwards. It continued to expand its holdings when, in 1978, it merged with Bendigo and Eaglehawk Star, a building society established in 1901.

Further growth involved the acquisition of the building societies Sandhurst, in 1983, and Sunraysia, in 1985, a merger with Sandhurst Trustees Ltd and the acquisition of Capital and Compass building societies.

In 1982 BBS became the first financial institution in Australia to introduce successfully both Visa credit and debit cards.

1993 saw BBS receive a stockmarket listing. Its growth continued throughout the 90s when it acquired National Mortgage Market Corporation Limited in 1995, a mortgage-manager company focussed on loan introducers and brokers. In that year BBS converted to a bank with the name Bendigo Bank. In 1997, Bendigo Bank acquired Monte Paschi Australia from Banca Monte dei Paschi di Siena, an Italian banking group, for AU$42.255M. Monte Paschi Australia was renamed Cassa Commerciale Australia in the same year.

Bendigo Bank's "Community Bank" program began in 1998—the first branches opened in the western Victoria towns of Minyip and Rupanyup on 26 June and the first metropolitan branch in the outer eastern suburb of Upwey on 19 October.

The late 1990s saw a further development when Bendigo Bank and Elders Australia formed Elders Rural Bank, a joint venture company focused on agribusiness and rural Australia. Bendigo Bank was also the first financial institution to introduce a mortgage offset account, now a standard banking product in Australia.

In 1999 the bank formed an alliance involving mutual shareholding with IOOF.

The bank received its operating licence in 2000 and absorbed the First Australian Building Society in Queensland, acquiring a new regional headquarters in Ipswich. That same year saw a A$75 million head office expansion in Bendigo.

In 2002 Bendigo Bank introduced the first "Green Loans" in Australia and formed "Community Sector Banking", a banking joint venture with the not-for-profit sector.

Three years later, Bendigo Bank built a regional headquarters on Harbour Esplanade in Melbourne, Docklands.

In 2007 Bendigo Bank rejected Bank of Queensland's merger/takeover proposal, and merged with Adelaide Bank. The A$4 billion takeover was completed on 30 November. Subsequently, shareholders voted to change the company's name to Bendigo and Adelaide Bank Limited, with the change taking effect from 31 March 2008.

On 11 December 2008, Bendigo Bank's new headquarters in Bendigo was completed. The 26th Prime Minister of Australia, Kevin Rudd, was present at the opening.

On 16 December 2011, Bendigo Bank announced that it had reached agreement with the Bank of Cyprus Group to acquire its 100 per cent owned Australian subsidiary, Bank of Cyprus Australia Limited (BOCAL). The purchase was for an estimated total consideration of A$130 million. It was renamed Delphi Bank. In 2022 BBL commenced a program to absorb the Delphi Bank branding, converting all customer products to Bendigo products and closing or re-branding Delphi branches Bendigo Bank branches.

In April 2013, Bendigo Bank's subsidiary 'Oxford Funding' was rebranded as Bendigo Debtor Finance, offering independent credit assessments and cash-flow solutions to businesses on a national level.

In June 2014, the bank became the first in Australia to adopt an investment policy which shunned fossil fuel investments. "Specifically, the bank does not lend to companies for whom the core activity is the exploration, mining, manufacture or export of thermal coal or coal seam gas."

On 1 March 2015, a group of credit unions diverged from Cuscal and aligned with Bendigo and Adelaide Bank to form Alliance Bank. The credit unions were AWA Credit Union/Mutual (Geelong, 1969), Circle Credit Co-operative Limited (Deer Park, 1969), Service One Credit Union (ACT, circa 1950), BDCU (Berrima, 1963), and in 2018 NOVA (Newcastle, 1964). Alliance Bank maintains some autonomy, but conducts regulated banking activities through Bendigo and Adelaide Bank. They still market themselves under their original name suffixed with "Alliance Bank" and declare themselves agents of Bendigo and Adelaide Bank. In January 2024 at an AWA Mutual Ltd shareholder meeting to vote on the proposed merger with Beyond Bank Australia Ltd took place on 29 January 2024. The voting process ended with 98% of votes being cast “FOR” the merger. Final regulatory and court approvals are set to conclude on 15 February 2024, leading the way for AWA to end the association with BBL and merge with Beyond Bank Australia.

On 2 June 2015, Bendigo Bank established an agency branch in Nauru, the country's first bank since the 2006 closure of the Bank of Nauru. On 14 November 2023, the bank announced that it intended to cease operations in the country by December 2024. On 19 March 2024, Bendigo Bank announced its intention to delay its exit to June 2025. During this time, it was the only bank in Nauru. In December 2024, it was announced that Commonwealth Bank intended to take over banking operations in Nauru. Bendigo Bank ended its agency agreement on 8 August 2025.

In December 2025, it was announced Bendigo Bank had agreed to acquire, subject to regulatory approval, the retail lending and deposit business of the Queensland, Australia-headquartered, RACQ Bank. The same month the Adelaide Bank brand was retired in favour of the Bendigo Bank brand.

== Community Bank program ==
Community banking is based on a 'profit-with-purpose' model, which means that profits are returned directly to the community that has generated them, after paying branch running costs. The program was a response to the massive closure of bank branches, predominantly in rural areas. Bendigo Bank has since extended the program to major metropolitan areas with existing bank services.

Since 1998, Community Banks have reinvested more than $416 million back into local communities. Funds generated help support emergency and rescue services, such as rural fire brigades and the State Emergency Service (SES), as well as other community needs like buses, defibrillators, aged care facilities, sports parks, hospital wings, and classrooms.

Subsidiaries of Bendigo and Adelaide Bank include Community Bank, Up, Leveraged Equities, Sandhurst Trustees and Community Enterprise Foundation.

Bendigo and Adelaide Bank had acquired Wheeler Financial Services which was merged with Bendigo Financial Planning, and also acquired Southern Finance.

== See also ==
- List of oldest companies in Australia
- Banking in Australia
- List of banks
- List of banks in Australia
- List of banks in Oceania
- Fincorp, a failed investment company trusteed for by Sandhurst Trustees
