= Elvina Bay =

- Suburb
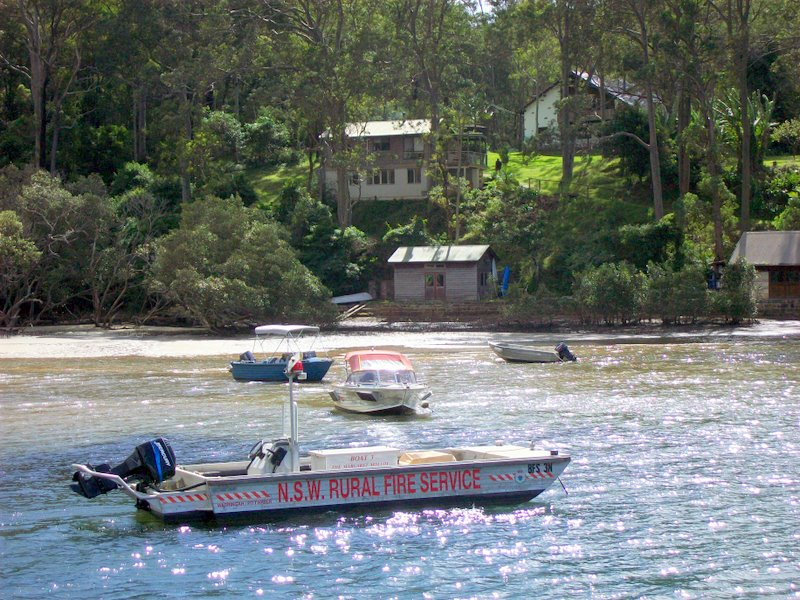
- Elvina Bay

- Interactive map of Elvina Bay
- Country: Australia
- State: New South Wales
- City: Sydney
- LGA: Northern Beaches Council

Government
  - State electorate: Pittwater
  - Federal division: Mackellar

Population
  - Total: 80 (2021 census)
- Postcode: 2105
Suburbs around Elvina Bay
Ku-ring-gai Chase National Park	Lovett Bay	Pittwater
Ku-ring-gai Chase National Park	Elvina Bay	Pittwater
Ku-ring-gai Chase National Park	Ku-ring-gai Chase National Park	McCarrs Creek

Elvina Bay is a bay and an adjacent suburb in northern Sydney, in the state of New South Wales, Australia. It is located 35 kilometres north of the Sydney central business district, in the local government area of Northern Beaches Council.

Elvina Bay is within the Ku-ring-gai Chase National Park, situated on the western shores of Pittwater, beside Lovett Bay. Scotland Island, Church Point and Morning Bay. Clareville is on the opposite (eastern) Pittwater shore.

Bushwalkers can access Elvina Bay and neighbouring Lovett Bay via the Elvina Bay Circuit. The circuit includes access to the bottom and top of Lovett Falls. The suburb is road-inaccessible otherwise.
