= Murder of Shandee Blackburn =

2013 murder in Australia

Shandee Blackburn
- Born: 11 June 1989
- Died: 9 February 2013 (aged 23); Mackay, Queensland, Australia
- Known for: Murder victim

Shandee Blackburn (11 June 1989 – 9 February 2013) was a 23-year-old woman who was murdered in Mackay, Queensland, Australia in February 2013. Blackburn's ex-boyfriend, John Peros, was initially charged with her murder, but was then acquitted in 2017 at trial. A 2019 coronial inquest, however, later identified Peros as the main suspect. A podcast by The Australian's Hedley Thomas was released in late 2021 which detailed the entirety of the case and issues concerning the investigation. As a result of the renewed interest created, the coronial inquest was reopened in February 2022.

== Murder ==
On 9 February 2013, just after midnight, Blackburn was walking home alone from her workplace in Mackay. CC TV captured Blackburn on her walk along Boddington Street before being ambushed about 100 metres from her house by an attacker. She was stabbed 23 times in multiple places including the neck, head, and chest including defensive wounds on her arms.

Due to her neck injuries, she was unable to call for help and crawled to the nearby gutter where she was heard by a neighbour, Ringo Tapim, who frantically called emergency services. An ambulance arrived a short time later at 12:26am, and attempts were made to resuscitate her before she was taken to hospital where she was pronounced dead.

Detective Scott Furlong of Queensland's Homicide Investigation Unit led the murder investigation into Ms Blackburn's death.

== Court hearings and trial ==
On 4 September 2014, ex-boyfriend John Peros was arrested and charged for the murder of Blackburn. The following day, he attended Brisbane Magistrates Court to answer to the charge and was remanded in custody to face a committal hearing in Mackay. The committal hearing was delayed and went ahead from 15 February 2016. At the hearing, another suspect, William Daniel, was questioned, and denied being the perpetrator. Given the ferocity of the attack, it was also speculated that her attacker was possibly high on methamphetamine.

At trial in the Supreme Court, further evidence linking Peros was given but nothing was produced that directly linked him to the murder. On 7 April 2017, Peros was found not guilty of murder by a jury.

== Controversy ==
Despite the evidence pointing to Peros, he was acquitted at trial, which led some to question the quality of the forensic evidence processing by the state-run laboratory. A former forensic biologist called the handling a "forensic train wreck". Forensic scientist, Kirsty Wright advised that there had been 17 incorrect results released from the laboratory. The Blackburn family's lawyer said to media that the evidence should be re-tested so that any new disparate pieces of evidence could be found. Due to the legal process already having acquitted Peros on the evidence presented at trial, new evidence would be required to successfully ensure he is held culpable for the crime.

== Coronial inquests ==
A coronial inquest was scheduled for July 2019. At a pre-inquest hearing in May 2019, Coroner David O'Connell told the court that a conflict of interest around a detective sergeant and William Daniel being related was not within the scope of the inquest.

On 8 July 2019, John Peros told the inquest that his memory of the time was poor. As the inquest continued, it was shown the evidence against Peros, including CCTV footage of a Toyota Hilux of the same age and colour as one he owned nearby the scene of the crime, six minutes prior. A witness recalled a time Peros made a statement about wanting to stab Blackburn. On 21 August 2020, O'Connell gave his findings that Peros was indeed responsible for the murder of Blackburn - despite being acquitted three years prior.

In December 2021, the renewed media coverage triggered by the podcast "Shandee's Story", and the mentioning of the forensic laboratory failures in Queensland Parliament, caused Blackburn's mother to call on the coronial inquest to be re-opened. The second coronial inquest was opened in February 2022.

== Media ==
In October 2021, the first episode of the crime podcast "Shandee's Story", narrated by journalist Hedley Thomas and produced by The Australian, was released and further episodes released weekly.

In February 2022, a documentary by Thomas called Shandee’s Story: The Search for Justice also helped focus attention on the inadequacies of the investigation.
