= McCarrs Creek =

- Suburb
- Interactive map of McCarrs Creek
- Country: Australia
- State: New South Wales
- City: Sydney
- LGA: Northern Beaches Council

Government
  - State electorate: Pittwater
  - Federal division: Mackellar
- Postcode: 2105
Suburbs around McCarrs Creek
| Ku-ring-gai Chase | Elvina Bay | Elvina Bay |
| Ku-ring-gai Chase | McCarrs Creek | Pittwater |
| Ku-ring-gai Chase | Pittwater | Church Point |

McCarrs Creek is a suburb that is located adjacent to McCarrs Creek, approximately 4 kilometres (2.5 mi) west of Newport, at the headwaters of the Pittwater in northern Sydney, in the state of New South Wales, Australia. McCarrs Creek was gazetted as a suburb on 20 January 2012.
