= Kirsty Wright =

Australian forensic scientist

- Citizenship: Australia
- Education: Griffith University (PhD)
- Known for: DNA profiling in 2004 Boxing Day tsunami, murder of Shandee Blackburn
- Scientific career
- Workplaces: Griffith University; Royal Australian Air Force

Kirsty M. Wright is an Australian forensic biologist, an academic and officer in the Royal Australian Air Force. She became publicly known for her works in DNA profiling of the victims of the 2002 Bali bombings and the 2004 Boxing Day tsunami. Her exposition of the Queensland DNA lab scandal and the murderer in the case of Shandee Blackburn made her recognised as "Australian of the Year" in 2022.

Wright is a senior lecturer of forensic biology at Griffith University in Brisbane, while being designated as a Reservist Squadron Leader in the Royal Australian Air Force. She is also leader of the project on recovery of war casualties under the Australian Defence Force, the research based in Queensland University of Technology.

== Biography ==
Wright never had an intention to become a scientist, as she explained her childhood, "I hated science with a passion. I hated maths. I had no intention of going to university at all." She studied humanities and general subjects up to higher secondary level. Without a plant for further education, she worked in a fast-food restaurant for four years, while taking up a course as a gym instructor. Not satisfied with her prospects, she decided to take up science, but was not directly eligible since she had no mathematics and science background. She completed bridging courses in basic sciences by which she was able to join BSc at Griffith University in Brisbane, after multiple rejections. A lecture she attended in 1995 on DNA testing by Lyn R. Griffiths which inspired her to take up forensic science. She graduated with honours in biomedical science in 2000. In 2013, she enrolled for doctoral programme, and earned a PhD from the same university.

Wright joined the Queensland forensics facility, which was in its infancy. She was a reporting scientist responsible for collecting and matching DNA profiles from crime scenes and individuals. She performed the entire DNA extraction and analysis. Thus, her job involved giving testimonies in a court. She developed a skill to identify missing persons or unidentified victims of crime and natural disasters. In 2007, she was appointed Programme Manager of Australia's National Criminal Investigation DNA Database (NCIDD) and simultaneously a lecturer of forensic biology at Griffith University. She has been deployed in several government services including as Reservist Squadron Leader (equivalent to Flight Lieutenant) in the Royal Australian Air Force.

Wright is also a regular consultant at the Queensland Attorney-General's office and member of the forensic team under the Australian Defence Force. She is also an expert for Interpol in major forensic operations, and for Australian Army in counter-terrorism and national security programmes. As a senior lecturer in forensic biology, she is assigned a special task of running a designated course, Master of Forensic Science that is exclusively for members of the Queensland Police Service.

She had been employed by army services for identifying soldier's remains from World War I, World War II and Korean War. She is the leader of the project on recovery of war casualties under the Australian Defence Force, the research based at the Genomics Research Centre of Queensland University of Technology.

== Contributions ==
=== Victim identification of the 2004 Boxing Day tsunami ===
On 26 December 2004, a tsunami in the Indian Ocean killed an estimated 250,000 people, with most deaths in Indonesia, India, and Thailand. Wright was called up by the Royal Thai Police to identify the victims to join the Thai Tsunami Victim Identification programme. The operation became the biggest and most successful victim identification (of a single event) in history. By 2008, 3,308 victims were identified using dental analysis (40%), DNA test (24%) and other evidence, and the individuals covered 41 nations. Wright was the lead scientist in the DNA tests and author of the scientific papers reporting the findings. The investigation became the basis for her PhD thesis.

=== Murder of Shandee Blackburn and the Queensland DNA lab scandal ===
On 9 February 2013, Shandee Blackburn was killed while she was walking home alone from her workplace in Mackay, Queensland. She was stabbed 23 times in multiple places including the neck, head, and chest including defensive wounds on her arms. On 4 September 2014, her ex-boyfriend John Peros was arrested and charged for the murder of Blackburn. After a trial, on 7 April 2017, Peros was acquitted by the Supreme Court.

The suspicion on Peros was still high as investigations indicated several lines of evidence, particularly a CCTV footage at the crime scene showing the physical appearance and clothes of the murderer as those of Peros. An inquest was conducted by Coroner David O'Connell in May 2019. On 21 August 2020, the coroner submitted his findings with a conclusion that Peros was the murderer.

In June 2021, Wright received a request from a journalist Hedley Thomas to look into the DNA evidence in the case. As she started analysing the case, she was surprised that no DNA evidence was brought up considering the severity of the stabbing and a pool of blood created in the crime scene. She knew that such a condition should undoubtedly provide many DNA sources. She further learned that the police failed to obtain DNA samples from Peros, especially from the car used by Peros at the time of the murder. When she analysed other DNA profiling results at the Queensland DNA lab, she found that there were too many negative tests, in spite of direct sampling from crime scenes and rape victims. She found a major flaw in the DNA processing method, the lab used only high amount of DNA which was done to simplify the procedure but would omit the tiny traces of DNA present. Wright knew that this was the basis of so many negative results that could have led to many acquittals of criminals.

Wright and Thomas submitted to the Queensland government several requests to revise DNA tests in Blackburn case and investigate the DNA lab, but were put aside. So they made the story public in The Australian podcast in October 2021, followed by a press conference. The government denied the allegations. As Wright prepared for further actions, the police submitted additional DNA samples from the Blackburn murder scene.

In June 2022, the Queensland government formed a Commission of Inquiry into Forensic DNA Testing in Queensland headed by Walter Sofronoff, former President of the Court of Appeal and a retired judge. The commission in its report in December 2022 revealed that the DNA lab had systematically produced unreliable results or "insufficient" samples since 2007 involving 30,000 cases of rape and murder. The government issued an order to retest all available DNA samples, and as the work was in progress, there were revelations of the toxic working environment in the lab. Then the number of cases affected rose to 40,000 and by October 2023, additional 7,000 cases were included. The health minister Shannon Fentiman announced on 5 October 2023 that a new inquiry commission led by Annabelle Bennett, retired federal court judge, will investigate the DNA processing management, known as Project 13. The investigation confirmed the allegations made by Wright and Thomas genuine. It recommended all 100,000 samples collected betweeen 2007 and 2016 renalaysed.

==== Outcomes ====
In March 2024, the Queensland government established the Forensic Science Queensland, an authority on statutory framework of forensic system, and introduced the Forensic Science Queensland Act 2024. In August 2024, the government formed an 11-member authority to oversee the forensic testing facility, chaired by Julie Dick, a former District Court judge. The public and media were furious as Wright was not included in the group. The issue became a political propaganda as David Crisafulli announced the next month that Wright will lead the lab reforms if his party, the Liberal National Party, wins the upcoming election in October. Crisafulli and his party won the 2024 Queensland state election. On 8 November 204, his government announced that Wright was appointed to "undertake a review of Queensland's DNA testing operations".

In June 2025, Crisafulli's government suspended Forensic Science Queensland director Linzi Wilson-Wilde after the lab was found in a stagnant stage and having contaminations of the samples. Wilson-Wilde resigned the next month. The government released Wright's review report in August 2025. On 6 August 2026, Wright announced that she relinquished her position.

=== Identification of historical human remains ===
Wright and her PhD scholars, Andrew Ghaiyed and Kyle James, developed a DNA method in 2019 for precise identification (based on mtDNA and Y-STR sequencing) of historical human remains. Their analysis of Australian soldiers who died in World War I, World War II and the Korean War showed that individuals could be accurately identified. She used the same technique for identifying the remains of Aboriginal Australians.

== Honours and recognitions ==
Wright was listed in The Courier-Mail's "Top 50 Best and Brightest of Queensland" in 2012. In 2013, she was included in the "100 Women of Influence Awards" by The Australian Financial Review. In 2015, she received the Queensland Police Commissioner's Award "for valuable contribution to the investigation into the murder of Daniel Morcombe". In 2022, she was named "Australian of the Year" by The Australian.
