= Lovett Bay =

- Suburb
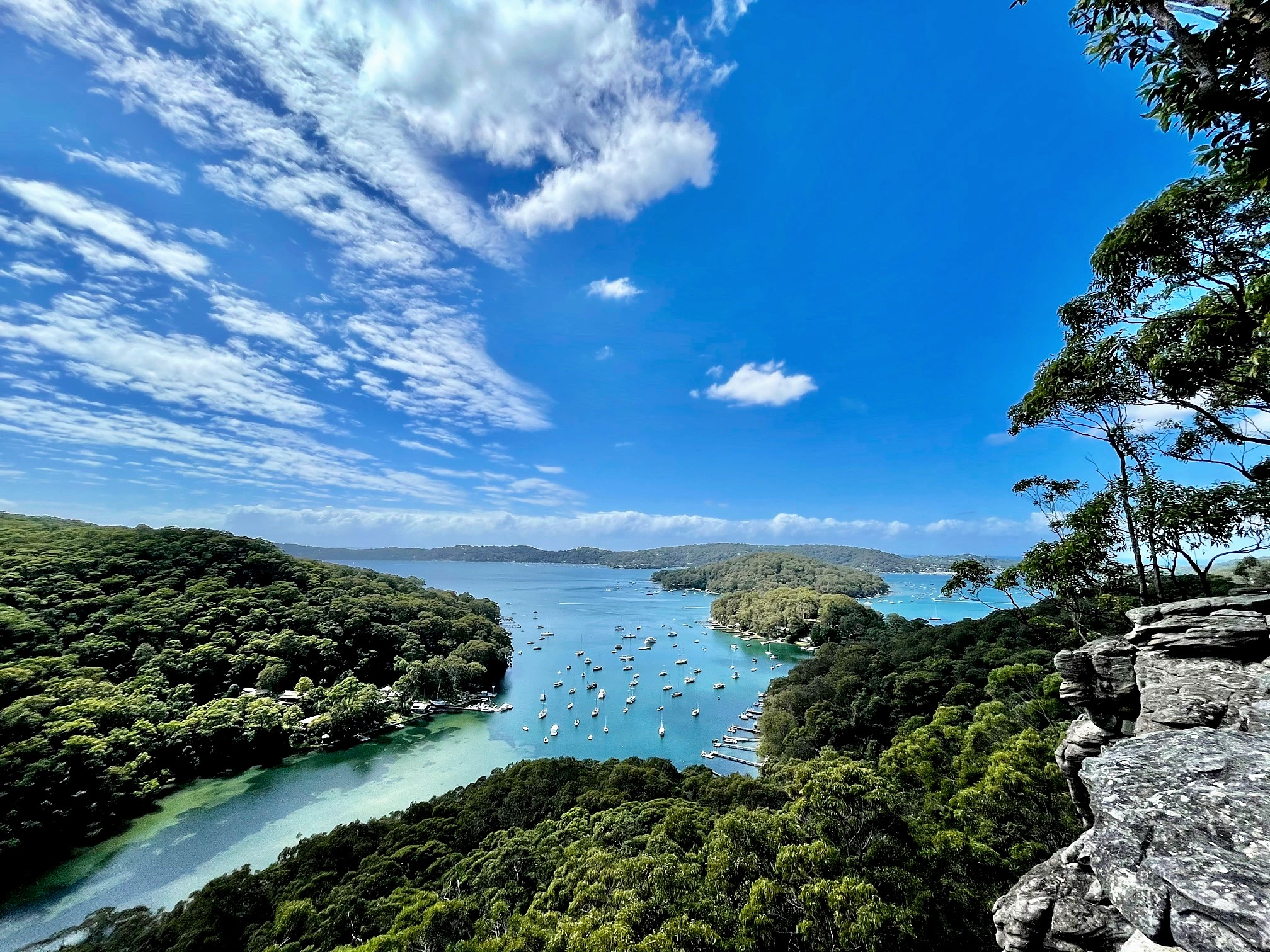
- Lovett Bay viewed from Ku-ring-gai Chase National Park

- Interactive map of Lovett Bay
- Country: Australia
- State: New South Wales
- City: Sydney
- LGA: Northern Beaches Council
- Location: 36 km (22 mi) north of Sydney CBD

Government
  - State electorate: Pittwater
  - Federal division: Mackellar
- Elevation: 13 m (43 ft)

Population
  - Total: 117 (2021 census)
- Postcode: 2105
Suburbs around Lovett Bay
Morning Bay	Morning Bay	Ku-ring-gai Chase National Park
Ku-ring-gai Chase National Park	Lovett Bay	Pittwater
Elvina Bay	Elvina Bay	Pittwater

Lovett Bay is a suburb and adjacent bay in northern Sydney, in the state of New South Wales, Australia. It is 36 kilometres north of the Sydney central business district, in the local government area of Northern Beaches Council.

Lovett Bay is in Ku-ring-gai Chase National Park, on the western shores of Pittwater, beside Elvina Bay. Scotland Island, Church Point and Morning Bay are nearby. Although on the mainland, access to Lovett Bay is by water, with no road access. Residents use their own boats to commute to Church Point or use the public ferry service.

Bushwalkers can access the southern shore of Lovett Bay and neighbouring Elvina Bay via:

- Elvina Bay Circuit. The circuit includes access to the bottom and top of Elvina Waterfalls.
- Towlers Bay Circuit. This circuit descends from Birnie Lookout to Lovett Bay.
