= Paul Dawson (rugby league) =

Former Australian rugby league footballer

Personal information
- Full name: Paul Dawson
- Born: 26 July 1948 (age 78) Sydney, New South Wales, Australia

Playing information

Rugby league
- Position: Second-row
Club
Years	Team	Pld	T	G	FG	P
1972–77	Newtown Jets	105	17	0	0	51

Rugby union
Club
Years	Team	Pld	T	G	FG	P
	Eastern Suburbs
- Education: Sydney Boys High School
- Relatives: Chris Dawson (brother)

Paul Anthony Dawson (born 26 July 1948) is an Australian former professional rugby league footballer who played in the 1970s, spending his entire career with Newtown in the NSWRL competition as a second-rower. He is the twin brother of Chris Dawson who also played for Newtown.

== Early life ==
Dawson attended Sydney Boys High School and he played rugby union for Eastern Suburbs before switching to play rugby league.

== Playing career ==
Dawson made his first grade debut for Newtown in 1972. In 1973, Jack Gibson was made the new head coach at Newtown and the club qualified for the finals that year. Dawson played in all of Newtown's finals matches as the club reached the preliminary final before losing to Cronulla. Dawson enjoyed his best season personally as he finished with 8 tries. After Gibson departed the club, Newtown failed to qualify for the finals and in Dawson's two final years at the club they finished last on the table claiming the wooden spoon. 1977 would be Dawson's final year in first grade and he retired at the end of the season.

== Post playing ==
After his Rugby career finished Dawson and his twin brother Chris both became Physical Education teachers at public high schools in the northern beaches of New South Wales, with Paul teaching at The Forest High School. He married Marilyn in 1969 and they had three daughters

The Dawson brothers and families moved to Queensland in 1985 with Paul working at Coombabah State High School.

Dawson's twin brother Chris was found guilty on August 30, 2022 of murdering his wife Lynette Dawson in 1982, after a judge-only trial in the Supreme Court of New South Wales.

There are multiple allegations of Paul having sex with students. He has denied wrongdoing.
