= Cromer Campus =

Australian state school

Cromer Campus (part of the Northern Beaches Secondary College)

Location
- 120 South Creek Road, Cromer, New South Wales; Australia; 33°44′15″S 151°17′01″E

Information
- Former name: Cromer High School
- Type: Government-funded co-educational comprehensive secondary day school
- Established: 1975; 51 years ago (as Cromer High School)
- School district: Northern Beaches
- Educational authority: New South Wales Department of Education
- Principal: Justin Hong
- Years: 7–12
- Enrolment: 1170 (2025)
- Campus type: Suburban
- Colours: Black and red
- Feeder schools: Cromer Public School; Dee Why Public School; Narraweena Public School; Wheeler Heights Public School
- Website: nbsccromer-h.schools.nsw.gov.au

The Cromer Campus of the Northern Beaches Secondary College is a government-funded co-educational comprehensive secondary day school, located in Cromer, a suburb on the Northern Beaches of Sydney, New South Wales, Australia.

Established in 1976 as Cromer High School, the campus caters for approximately 1170 students from Year 7 to Year 12. The school is operated by the New South Wales Department of Education; the principal is Justin Hong.

Its catchment zone covers the suburbs of Cromer, Brookvale, Dee Why, Wheeler Heights, Narraweena and Collaroy Plateau.

== Facilities ==
The school provides services for students such as extension classes for gifted students and talented programs catering for higher ability students. Cromer Campus also provides a gymnasium, networked IT lab, drama and art studios as well as large playing fields, netball courts and basketball courts.

== Sexual abuse claims and murder investigations ==
Sexual abuse claims about both male and female teachers grooming and having sexual relationships with students during the 1980s came to light as part of The Teacher's Pet podcast into the disappearance of Lynette Dawson. In August 2022, Physical Education teacher Chris Dawson was convicted of the murder of Lynette Dawson, his former wife.

Several teachers at Cromer and other northern beaches schools were identified by former children as grooming students. Peter Wayne Scott, a former teacher, was found guilty in 2014 of homosexual sex with a minor, indecent assault, and providing a stupefying drug for the purpose of having homosexual sex with a minor from his activities at the school between 1984 and 1986.

== Notable alumni ==
- Michael Caruso, racing driver
- Adam Cullen, artist
- Lisa Forrest, Commonwealth Games dual gold medalist in swimming
- William Hopoate, Rugby league player for the Manly Warringah Sea Eagles
- George Smith, rugby union player
- Joshua Patterson, actor

== See also ==
- List of government schools in New South Wales
- Education in Australia
