= Adelaide Bank =

Bank based in Adelaide, South Australia

- Type: Publicly listed bank
- Industry: Banking
- Founded: 1 January 1994
- Defunct: 9 August 2007
- Fate: merged with Bendigo Bank
- Headquarters: Adelaide, Australia

The Adelaide Bank was a publicly listed bank with its head office in Adelaide, South Australia. It was established on 1 January 1994 from the Co-operative Building Society of South Australia Limited, which was Australia's largest building society as a result of a merger with the Hindmarsh Building Society. On 9 August 2007 it merged with Bendigo Bank (ASX: BEN) to form Bendigo and Adelaide Bank Limited, and Adelaide Bank shares ceased to be quoted on the top 100 ASX for companies with more than 110,000 shareholders. Since 2008 the new entity has been known as the Bendigo and Adelaide Bank.

== History ==
=== As a building society ===
The Hindmarsh Building Society was established in 1877 in Hindmarsh, South Australia, on the principles that "home ownership is the cornerstone of a successful community and that owning a home should be possible for everyone". From 1877 to 1968 it was known as the Hindmarsh Loan, Land, Building and Investment Society, after which it became known as the Hindmarsh Building Society. In October 1974 the Hindmarsh Building Society was briefly subject to a "run". The State Premier, Don Dunstan, arrived with a loud-hailer to assure people that their money was safe and that the building society was backed by the state government. In 1977 it donated the "Mall's Balls" (The Spheres by Herbert Flugelman) to the City of Adelaide to mark the centenary of the society.

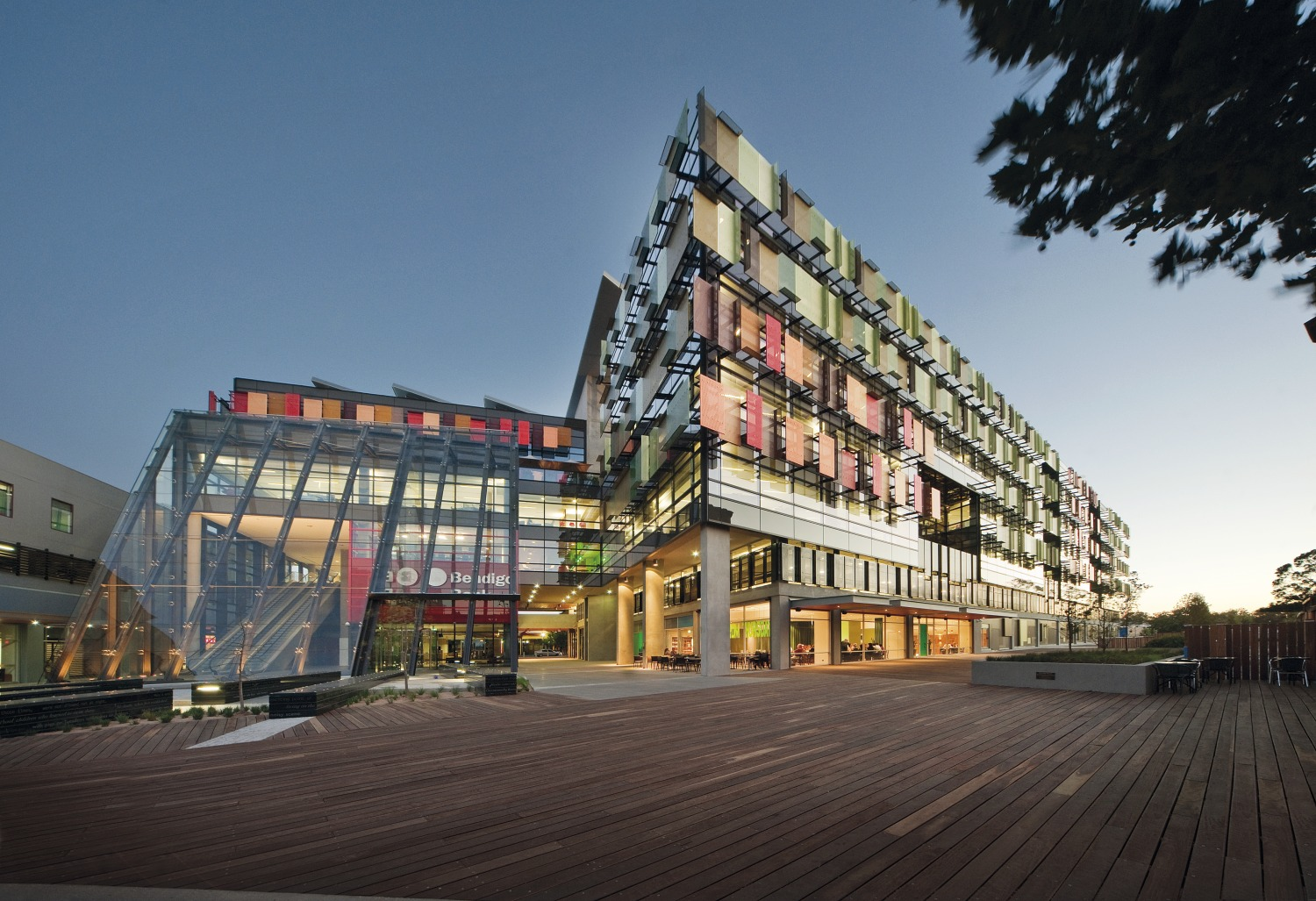
The Bendigo Centre

The Co-operative Building Society of South Australia Limited was founded by Alwin Fischer and incorporated in 1900, and by 1990, the building society's asset base passed the $1 billion mark. In 1992 the Society amalgamated with the Hindmarsh Building Society.

=== As a bank ===
Adelaide Bank was established on 1 January 1994 from the Co-operative Building Society of South Australia Limited, which was Australia's largest building society as a result of a merger with the Hindmarsh Building Society in 1992.

On 9 August 2007, the Adelaide Bank was merged with the Bendigo Bank. On 12 November 2007, ~98% of the Adelaide Bank Ordinary Shareholders voted their support for the merger. The Federal Courts then approved the merger on Friday, 16 November and the implementation date of the merged bank was Friday, 30 November. In March 2008 the merged bank officially changed its name to Bendigo and Adelaide Bank Limited.
