= Morning Bay =

- Suburb
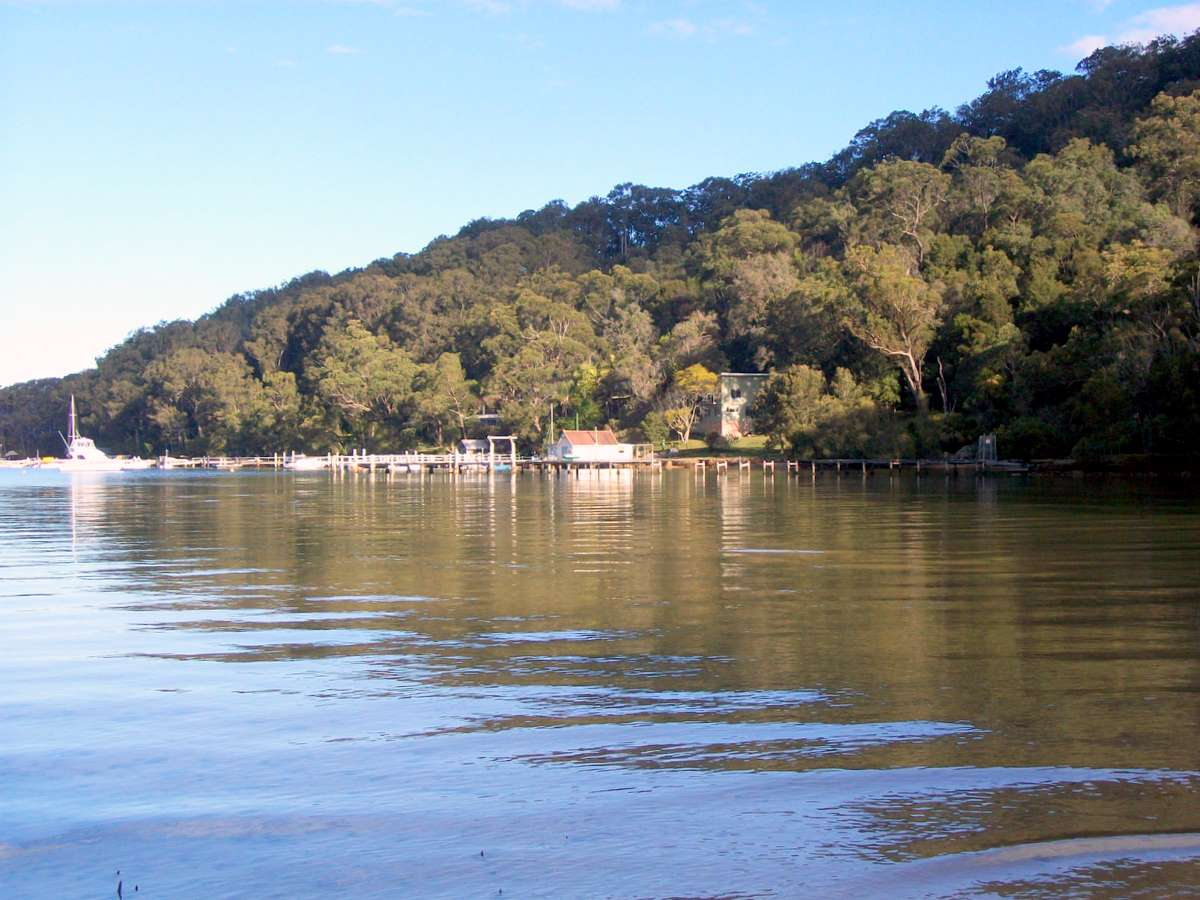
- Morning Bay

- Interactive map of Morning Bay
- Country: Australia
- State: New South Wales
- City: Sydney
- LGA: Northern Beaches Council
- Location: 40 km (25 mi) north of Sydney CBD

Government
  - State electorate: Pittwater
  - Federal division: Mackellar
- Elevation: 14 m (46 ft)

Population
  - Total: 31 (2021 census)
- Postcode: 2105
Suburbs around Morning Bay
	Coasters Retreat
Ku-ring-gai Chase National Park	Morning Bay	Pittwater
	Lovett Bay

Morning Bay is a road-inaccessible suburb and adjoining bay in northern Sydney, in the state of New South Wales, Australia. Morning Bay is located 40 kilometres north of the Sydney central business district, in the local government area of Northern Beaches Council.

Morning Bay is in Ku-ring-gai Chase National Park, on the western shores of Pittwater.
