= The Klaxon (website) =

Independent Australian news website

The Klaxon is an independent Australian news website, run by investigative journalist Anthony Klan. It specialises in exposing corruption and misconduct by businesses and governments.

== Overview ==
The Klaxon was registered in May 2019 in the state of New South Wales as an independent news outlet. Its articles have been cited in by other independent news websites, such as Crikey, and Michael West Media; and reported in foreign media. Examples of the latter include:

- In July 2020, Indian media also reported on Klan's allegations that China and Pakistan might have signed a secret agreement to increase their knowledge of bio-warfare, a claim refuted by both countries.
- In March 2021, reporting on the secret development of nuclear weapons for Pakistan, in a deal with a Chinese company.
- In May 2022, reporting on Chinese military drills in the Khabarovsk and Ussuriysk regions, near the border with Russia, while world news was focused on the Russian invasion of Ukraine and Chinese movements in the Taiwan Strait.
- In February 2022, reporting on the Galwan Valley clash in Indian media, when Klan reported that the Chinese Government had exaggerated the number of Chinese fatalities

The Klaxon articles are syndicated by the Bywire in the UK.

== Anthony Klan ==
Anthony Klan was an investigative and business journalist at The Australian for 15 years, but he quit in 2019 after the paper had refused to publish two of his investigations: one into the superannuation system, and another was about interference by the Chinese Communist Party in Australia, which implicated former prime minister Scott Morrison and former leader of the Liberal Party of Australia, Peter Dutton. He believes that their publication would have seen the Liberals lose the 2019 election. He later opined that he had concluded that News Corp was "incredibly in the pocket of the lobbyists of the minerals, the mining, the gas and of the big banks". He is particularly concerned about Australia's slide into corruption, citing Transparency International's report that Hungary and Australia tie for last place in falling into corruption between 2012 and 2022.

In 2021 Klan participated in an enquiry into media diversity by the Senate Environment and Communications References Committee, which published its report on 9 December 2021.

In November 2021 Klan nominated for the position of national president of the Media, Entertainment and Arts Alliance. He has also written for Crikey and Financial Times.

=== Awards and nominations ===
Klan has won or been nominated for a number of journalism awards.

- He won the Walkley Award in 2007 for business journalism for his story on the Fincorp collapse.
- In October 2010 Klan won News Corp Australia's top award, the Sir Keith Murdoch Award, for "his relentless pursuit of the waste and mismanagement in the $16.2 billion schools stimulus package".
- He won News Corp business journalist of the year three times (2007, 2011 and 2014).
- He was shortlisted in the 2010 Graham Perkin Australian Journalist of the Year Award ("for more than 80 articles exposing flaws in the Federal Government's 'Building the Education Revolution' scheme").
- He was a finalist in both business and investigative categories of the Society of Publishers in Asia (SOPA) Awards in 2016.
- He made the shortlist in the Kennedy Award several times: for Outstanding Investigative Reporting and Outstanding Finance Reporting in 2015; and for Outstanding Finance Reporting (2016, with The Australian, and 2021, for The Klaxon.).
- In 2018 Klan won the Cass Warneminde Best News Journalist in the IT Journalism Awards ("The Lizzies"), and in 2021 he was a finalist in the 21st IT Journalism Awards, in two categories: Best Independent Coverage and Best Security Journalist.
- In 2023 he has been nominated in the Best Independent Coverage and Best Security Journalist categories in the Lizzies.
