= Murder of Lynette Dawson =

Australian disappearance case

- Date: c. 8 January 1982
- Perpetrator: Chris Dawson
- Deaths: Lynette Dawson
- Charges: Murder
- Verdict: Guilty
- Sentence: 24 years' jail, non-parole period of 18 years

Lynette Joy Dawson (née Simms; born 1948) was an Australian woman who disappeared on or about 8 January 1982, leaving two daughters and her husband, former rugby league footballer Chris Dawson. Her whereabouts are unknown, but two coronial inquests concluded that she had been murdered. On 30 August 2022, Chris Dawson was convicted of Lynette's murder and sentenced to 24 years in prison.

== Background ==
Lynette Simms and Chris Dawson, both aged 16, met at a high-school function in 1965. They were married in 1970 at St Jude's Church, Randwick, in Sydney and later had two children. Between 1972 and 1976, Chris and his identical twin brother Paul played professional rugby league football for the Newtown Jets. In 1975, the Dawson brothers and their spouses appeared on the ABC documentary program Chequerboard to discuss how the twins' close bond affected their lives.

After ending their rugby careers, the Dawson brothers found employment as physical education teachers, with Chris working at Cromer High School near Sydney. Both Chris and Paul are alleged to have regularly engaged in illicit sexual behaviour with female students at their respective schools; Chris is further alleged to have been one of six male teachers who preyed on students at Cromer High School. In 1981, Chris groomed and had sex with Cromer student Joanne Curtis, who temporarily moved into the Dawson family residence in Bayview at Chris's invitation. She permanently moved into the residence on 10 January 1982, two days after Lynette's disappearance.

Lynette was phoned by her mother on 8 January 1982, the last time they would communicate with each other. She planned to meet her mother and family at Northbridge Baths the following day, but never arrived. Chris did not report his wife as missing until six weeks after she had vanished. He claimed that she left after marital problems caused over her Bankcard spending. In a statement to police, Chris suggested that she had joined a religious organization. He finalized divorce proceedings against Lynette in 1983, and married Curtis the following year.

== Investigation ==
After investigations by the New South Wales Police proved inconclusive, the NSW State Coroner conducted two coronial inquiries into Lynette's disappearance. At the first inquest held in February 2001, the Deputy State Coroner Jan Stevenson determined that Lynette had been murdered and that her killer was someone she knew. The coroner recommended charges be laid; however, Nicholas Cowdery QC, the NSW Director of Public Prosecutions, assessed that there was insufficient evidence for a criminal conviction. A second inquest, held in February 2003 by State Coroner Carl Milovanovich, recommended Chris be charged with Lynette's murder. Cowdery again refused to prosecute Dawson, citing the lack of evidence.

In April 2018, following extensive investigations, NSW Police requested the Office of the Director of Public Prosecutions to review its brief of evidence. Chris was arrested in Queensland in December 2018, extradited to New South Wales, and charged with the murder of his first wife. He was granted bail, and in June 2019 pleaded not guilty to her murder. In February 2020, Chris was committed to stand trial for the murder of Dawson. He also faced a charge of carnal knowledge with a girl between the ages of 10 and 17, relating to his sexual relationship with Curtis while still a teacher at Cromer High School.

=== Trial ===
Chris Dawson applied to have the case stayed on the basis that there had been an "inordinate delay" in prosecuting him, and that there was a risk that members of the jury could have prejudged his guilt due to widespread publicity about the case. A temporary stay was granted "to allow publicity to fade from jurors' minds", but his application for a permanent stay was denied in both the NSW Supreme Court and the Court of Criminal Appeal. In April 2022, he was denied special leave by Justice Stephen Gageler to appeal to the High Court of Australia.

In May 2022, Justice Robert Beech-Jones granted Dawson's application for a judge-alone trial after he argued the "extensive pre-trial publicity meant a jury was unsuitable in his case." The trial before Justice Ian Harrison began on 9 May and ran for 10 weeks, concluding on 11 July. The prosecution presented a circumstantial case, alleging Dawson's motive for murder was his desire for an "unfettered relationship" with Curtis. The defence acknowledge Dawson may have "failed" his wife but that she "left and abandoned" the family of her own accord, and suggested she may have created a new life. The defence relied on a number of witnesses who claimed to have seen Lynette since her disappearance. Chris Dawson chose not to give evidence.

On 30 August 2022, Justice Harrison took five hours to deliver his reasons for finding Dawson guilty. He found Dawson had lied on a number of occasions, including about his relationship with Curtis, about his desire to resume a relationship with his wife, and about receiving phone calls from Lynette after she disappeared. Harrison rejected the alleged sightings of Lynette as "wholly unreliable", and found there was a "most compelling body of evidence" to reject the hypothesis that Lynette Dawson abandoned her family. He was satisfied beyond reasonable doubt that Lynette Dawson died "as a result of a conscious and voluntary act" by Chris Dawson.

On 2 December 2022, Dawson was sentenced to 24 years in jail, with a non-parole period of 18 years, for the murder of Lynette. A subsequent appeal was dismissed.

== Media ==
A 16-part Australian crime podcast series, The Teacher's Pet, by Walkley Award-winning journalist Hedley Thomas of The Australian, was broadcast in 2018 with a large amount of evidence that was not collected by any of the police investigations. The series has close to 30 million downloads and created a large amount of public interest in the case. It was made unavailable in Australia during legal proceedings. In October 2023, the book version of The Teacher's Pet was released on 10 October.

== See also ==
- List of people who disappeared mysteriously: 1910–1990
