= The Teacher's Pet =

Australian true crime podcast

The Teacher′s Pet
- Genre: Crime
- Language: English

Cast and voices
- Hosted by: Hedley Thomas

Production
- Length: 50–121 minutes

Publication
- No. of episodes: 17
- Original release: 15 May 2018
- Provider: The Australian
- Updates: Weekly

The Teacher's Pet is a 2018 Australian crime podcast that investigated the disappearance of Lynette Dawson. Published by The Australian newspaper, the podcast was hosted by journalist Hedley Thomas and produced by Slade Gibson. As of 2020, the series has had close to 30 million downloads and reached number one in podcast charts in Australia, the UK, Canada, and New Zealand.

== Description ==
Lynette Dawson was an Australian nurse, homemaker and mother. She disappeared without a trace in 1982 and her whereabouts, dead or alive, have never been determined. The Teacher's Pet podcast investigated details of her marriage to rugby league player and teacher Chris Dawson, her disappearance, an extramarital affair between her husband and a 16-year-old school girl, claims of sexual misconduct between teachers and students at Cromer High and other Northern Beaches public high schools, flaws in the police investigation, effects on the families involved and the unwillingness of the Office of the Director of Public Prosecutions to charge Chris Dawson despite two coronial inquests concluding that Dawson was dead and most likely killed by a known person.

Thomas created the podcast and the series was produced by Slade Gibson, former guitarist for the rock band Savage Garden. The series commenced in May 2018 and the core podcast concluded in August 2018 after 14 episodes. When announcing the final episode, Thomas stated that, "The investigating and reporting job has largely been done in examining and bringing to light the new evidence that’s out there," and added that more episodes would be produced when new leads are fully explored.

Two further episodes were added in late 2018 as the case evolved; the first covered a new dig for evidence at the Dawsons's former Bayview home, and the second detailed the arrest of Dawson on 5 December 2018 by detectives from the Queensland Homicide squad. On advice from the Office of the New South Wales Director of Public Prosecutions, and in the interests of a fair trial, The Australian removed The Teacher's Pet from download in Australia in April 2019, prior to the upcoming court case.

Throughout the murder trial, a follow-up podcast called The Teacher's Trial was released each Friday, summarising what had happened in court during the week. Chris Dawson was found guilty on 30 August 2022. The podcast was made available again in Australia in September 2022, after Chris Dawsons's conviction.

== Episodes ==
No.	Title	Original release date
1	"Bayview"	17 May 2018
2	"Cromer High"	23 May 2018
3	"Bruised"	30 May 2018
4	"Soft Soil"	6 June 2018
5	"A Lovely Drink"	13 June 2018
6	"Gone"	21 June 2018
7	"The Rings"	28 June 2018
8	"Hopeless"	5 July 2018
9	"Dreamworld"	12 July 2018
10	"Damaged"	19 July 2018
11	"Loyalty"	26 July 2018
12	"Momentum"	2 August 2018
13	"The System"	9 August 2018
14	"Decision Time"	17 August 2018
15	"Digging"	29 November 2018
16	"Arrest"	5 December 2018
17	"Special Update Episode"	5 April 2019

== Reception ==
The series has had over 28 million downloads, was the number one Australian podcast, and also reached number one in the UK, Canada and New Zealand. Both Thomas and Gibson won Gold Walkley Awards for The Teacher's Pet. Despite Walkley Award judges declaring the podcast to be "a masterclass in investigative journalism", in an article for Inside story Melbourne Law School professor Jeremy Gans stated that "As admissible evidence goes, the podcast’s case is even less compelling" and attributed any new leads to the popularity and publicity generated by The Teacher's Pet, rather than any investigation done by the podcast.

The Sydney Morning Herald reported a police source as stating "that "100 per cent" of the reason for the new dig was public pressure that had come about following the podcast and subsequent media and public interest in the case", but "Witnesses have told police and the podcast two different versions of events" and that "some of the information used in the podcast came from a clairvoyant." The ABC also reported police sources as denying that The Teacher's Pet investigation led to Chris Dawson's arrest.

In July 2018, NSW Police began Strike Force Southwood to look into claims of sexual assaults and student-teacher relationships at high schools mentioned in the podcast, and it has been credited with encouraging more women to come forward to give evidence. While crediting The Teachers Pet with inspiring investigations into the possible abuse, The Sydney Morning Herald commented after Dawson's arrest that the popularity and biased nature of the podcast would jeopardise any conviction, as the defence had a "compelling argument that their client has little chance of receiving a fair trial".

== Awards ==
- 2024 awarded Audio Book of the Year at the Australian Book Industry Awards.
