= Paul Whittaker (newspaper editor) =

Paul Whittaker is an Australian newspaper journalist and editor. In 2018, he was appointed CEO of Sky News in Australia.

== Career ==
Whittaker was editor of The Australian from 2007 to 2011, having previously held roles of national chief of staff and deputy editor.

From 2011 to 2015 he was editor of The Daily Telegraph, where he championed the Badgerys Creek Airport and the interests of Western Sydney. In 2014 he established the Bradfield Oration, a series of public talks addressing the future vision for Sydney.

In October 2018 he announced he was leaving The Australian to take up the position of CEO for Sky News.

== Awards ==
Whittaker has won three Walkley Awards, including one in 2015 for Headline Journalism in the Daily Telegraph for his headlines:

- "Cardinal spin" (Cardinal George Pell's appearance before the Royal Commission into Institutional Responses to Child Sexual Abuse)
- "The Grapes of Bof" (NSW Premier Barry O’Farrell's failure to declare a gift of a $3000 bottle of Penfords Grange wine)
- " Palmersnorus" (Clive Palmer, owner of the Palmersaurus Dinosaur Park, sleeping during Question Time in the Australian House of Representatives)
