= Hedley Thomas =

Australian journalist

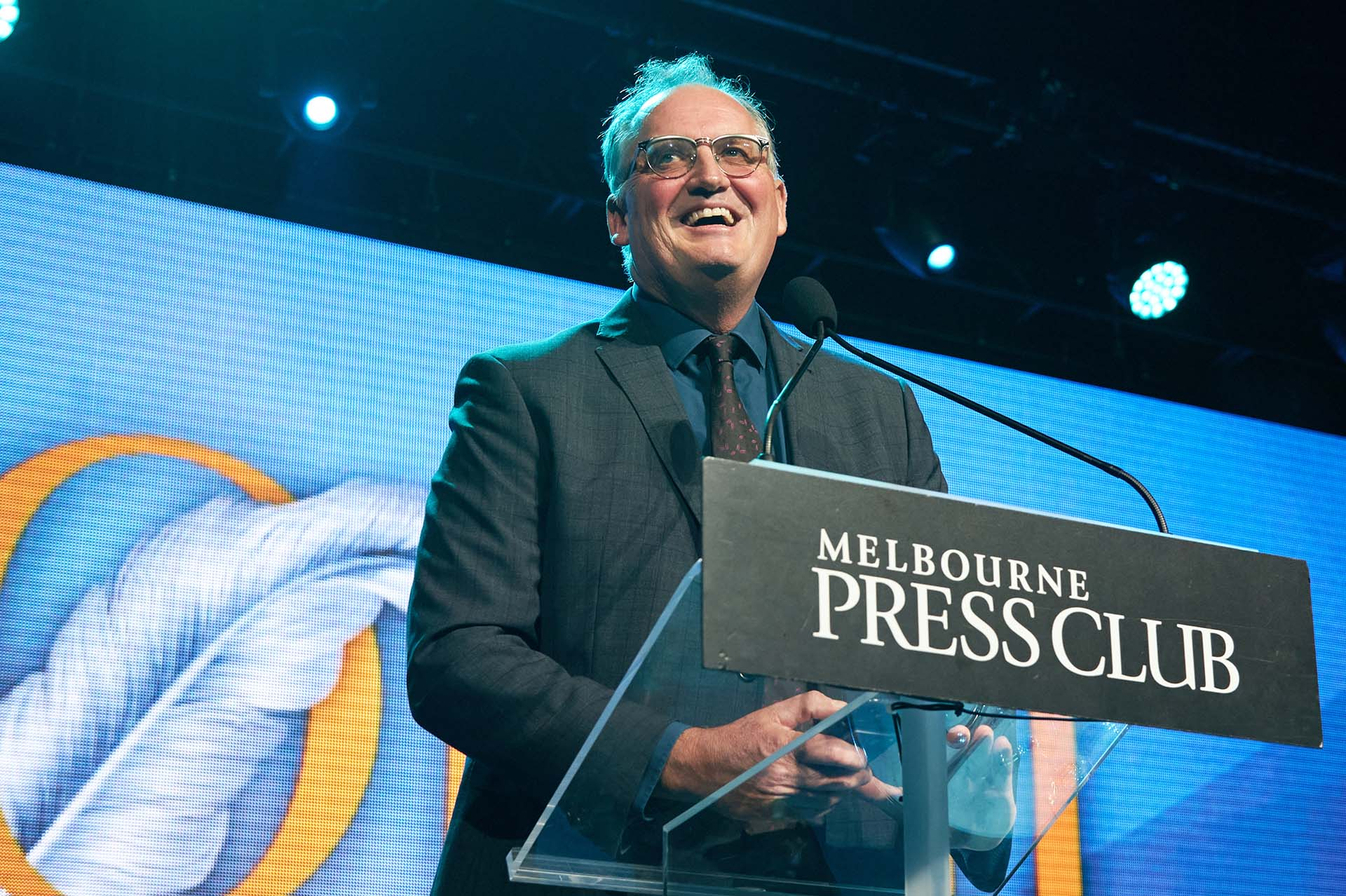
- Occupations: Journalist and author
- Known for: Walkley Awards; including two Gold Walkleys
- Notable work: The Teacher's Pet; Sick to Death

Hedley Thomas is an Australian investigative journalist, author and podcast producer based in Brisbane. He has been a staff writer at The Courier-Mail, the South China Morning Post and The Australian. He is known for producing The Teacher’s Pet, a true-crime podcast that examined the 1982 disappearance of Sydney woman Lynette Dawson. The podcast preceded the conviction of her husband, Chris Dawson, for her murder. He has been awarded eight Walkley Awards during his career, including two Gold Walkleys.

== Early life ==
Thomas was born on Sheppard Air Force Base in Wichita Falls, Texas where his father, a Royal Australian Air Force pilot, was stationed on secondment. He grew up on the Gold Coast, Queensland and graduated from Keebra Park State High School.

== Career ==
=== Early career (1984 – 1999) ===
Thomas began working as a copy boy at the Gold Coast Bulletin in 1984 before commencing a cadetship in 1985. In 1988, he moved to The Courier-Mail in Brisbane, and by mid-1989 had taken up a foreign correspondent role in London with News Limited. During his time in Europe, he covered major geopolitical events including the Fall of the Berlin Wall and the Romanian Revolution.

He returned to Brisbane in 1991 and resumed work at The Courier-Mail. In 1993, Thomas relocated to Hong Kong, where he held senior editorial roles at the Hong Kong Standard and the South China Morning Post, including positions as senior reporter and deputy features editor. In 1998, he conducted a prescient interview with U.S. President Donald Trump in which Trump discussed politics, ego and his own political ambitions.

In 1999, Thomas returned to Brisbane and rejoined The Courier-Mail.

=== Investigative reporting in Australia (1999 – 2017) ===
From 1999, Thomas focused on investigative journalism for The Courier-Mail and later The Australian. He won the 1999 Walkley Award for Best Investigative Writing alongside Paul Whittaker for exposing a covert online betting operation known as the "Net Bet affair". In 2003, he won another Walkley for a feature on the jailing of Queensland Chief Magistrate Diane Fingleton.

In 2005, Thomas investigated medical negligence involving Queensland surgeon Dr. Jayant Patel. His reporting led to public inquiries and won a Walkley Award and the Sir Keith Murdoch Award for Journalism. His articles formed the basis for his book Sick to Death (2007), which won the Queensland Premiers Literary Award for "Literary Work Advancing Public Debate". In 2025, Thomas returned to the investigation and its consequences in podcast format.

Thomas joined The Australian as National Chief Correspondent in 2006. His reporting on the arrest and mistreatment of Indian-born doctor Muhamed Haneef in 2007 earned him his first Gold Walkley for excellence in journalism.

After working in corporate communications at Queensland Gas Company (QGC) and BG Group between 2008 and 2010, Thomas returned to The Australian in 2010. He subsequently covered stories on political misconduct, trade union corruption and public infrastructure, including high-profile figures such as Clive Palmer. His work on the Wivenhoe Dam inquiry and Queensland floods earned him the 2012 Clarion Award for Queensland Journalist of the Year.

=== The Teacher's Pet and later work ===
Thomas won a second Gold Walkley in 2018, along with producer Slade Gibson, for podcast series The Teacher's Pet, a 14-episode investigation of the unsolved disappearance of Sydney mother Lynette Dawson in 1982. The podcast series has been downloaded more than 80 million times and was the first Australian podcast to hit the number one spot in the US, the UK, Canada and New Zealand. As a result of its success, the investigative depth of the show was also criticised as potentially complicating, or compromising, witness testimony and ongoing police investigations.

In 2022, Lynette Dawson's former husband Chris Dawson was convicted of her murder, a decision her family attributed to the podcast's impact. Thomas received the Sir Keith Murdoch Award for his work on the podcast series.

He released two follow-up podcasts, The Teacher’s Trial (2022) and The Teacher’s Accuser (2023), and a book adaptation in late 2023. He has described his journalistic process and the transition from print journalism to a podcast format.

Thomas has investigated a number of other cases in subsequent true crime podcasts, including The Night Driver (2020), Shandee’s Story (2021), Shandee’s Legacy (2022–2023) and Bronwyn (2024). His investigation during Shandee's Story revealed systemic failures in Queensland's DNA lab, with assistance from forensic biologist, Kirsty Wright. The findings prompted the coronial inquest into her disappearance to reopen and triggered a Commission of Inquiry into Queensland's state-run forensics lab. In his final report, Commissioner Walter Sofronoff recognised Thomas's “professional skill and determination” in uncovering one of the worst forensic failures in Australian legal history.

Thomas was inducted into the Melbourne Press Club’s Media Hall of Fame in November 2018.

== Personal life ==
Thomas met his wife, journalist Ruth Mathewson, in 1992. The couple have two children and have resided in Brisbane since 1999. In 2002, Thomas, Mathewson and their two young children were victims of a drive-by shooting at the family home, which was reported in local media. Thomas experienced PTSD in the wake of the shooting.

Thomas links his keen interest in the Lynette Dawson case to the unsolved disappearance of his paternal grandmother, who went missing from Dee Why in northern Sydney when his father was a child. He has acknowledged feeling compelled by the similarities between the two cases, particularly following the death of his father in 2017.

== Awards ==
Awards include:

- 1999 Walkley for Best Investigative Writing (with Paul Whittaker) for exposing the "Net Bet affair".
- 2003 Walkley for Best Print Feature, "Court in Crisis" on Diane Fingleton, jailed Chief Magistrate of Queensland.
- 2005 Walkley for Best Print News Story, "Exposing a Sick System" on Jayant Patel, Bundaberg Director of Surgery.
- 2005 Sir Keith Murdoch Award, "Exposing a Sick System".
- 2007 Gold Walkley and Walkley for Best Print New story for Mohamed Haneef investigation.
- 2012 Queensland Clarion Award for Queensland Journalist of the Year for highlighting evidence overlooked by the judicial inquiry into the operation of the Wivenhoe Dam during the 2011 Queensland floods.
- 2012 Honorary Doctorate of Journalism from John Henningham's Jschool School of Journalism in Brisbane.
- 2018 Gold Walkley for The Teacher's Pet podcast.
- 2018 Clarion Award for Best Radio/Audio (with Slade Gibson) for The Teacher’s Pet podcast.
- 2022 Sir Keith Murdoch Award for The Teacher's Pet podcast.

== Selected published works ==
=== Non-fiction ===
- Thomas, Hedley (2007). Sick to Death: A Manipulative Surgeon and a Health System in Crisis – A Disaster Waiting to Happen. Crows Nest, NSW: Allen & Unwin. ISBN 978-1-74114-881-7.
- Thomas, Hedley (2023). The Teacher's Pet. Sydney: Macmillan Australia. ISBN 9781760784782.

=== Podcasts ===
- The Teacher's Pet (2018).
- The Night Driver (2020).
- Shandee's Story (2021).
- The Teacher's Trial (2022).
- Shandee's Legacy (2022).
- The Teacher's Accuser (2023).
- Bronwyn (2024).
- Sick to Death (2025).
- "Snakes and Ladders" (2021) from Stories in the key of GC's podcast.
