= Chris Dawson (rugby league) =

Australian convicted murderer (born 1948)

Personal information
- Full name: Christopher Michael Dawson
- Born: 26 July 1948 (age 78) Sydney, Australia

Playing information

Rugby league
- Position: Second-row, Prop
Club
Years	Team	Pld	T	G	FG	P
1972–77	Newtown Jets	53	11	0	0	33

Rugby union
Club
Years	Team	Pld	T	G	FG	P
	Eastern Suburbs
- Spouses: Lynette Joy Simms (m. 1970; div. 1983); Joanne Curtis (m. 1984; div. 1993); Susan (m. 2003; div. 2023)
- Children: 3
- Relatives: Paul Dawson (brother)

Christopher Michael Dawson (born 26 July 1948) is an Australian convicted murderer and sex offender, and a former professional rugby league footballer who played in the 1970s.

Following the 1982 disappearance of his wife, Lynette, and two separate coronial inquests, the New South Wales State Coroner determined that Lynette was dead and that Chris Dawson was her most likely murderer. After many years of stalled and failed investigations, Dawson was arrested and charged with murder in December 2018. He was granted bail after he paid the court A$1.5 million. The bail conditions required him to surrender his passport to Queensland police and to live with his current wife. His trial started on 9 May 2022 in the Supreme Court of New South Wales.

In 2022, Dawson was found guilty of murdering Lynette, and was sentenced to 24 years in prison. He is currently incarcerated at Long Bay Correctional Centre.

== Early life ==
Dawson was born in Sydney, New South Wales. He is the second born of twins; his twin brother is Paul who was also a professional rugby league player and he has an older brother, Peter. Dawson attended Sydney Boys High School where he was a prefect. He graduated in 1966.

Dawson met Lynette Simms at a high school function in 1965, when they were both aged sixteen. They married in 1970 at St Jude's Church, Randwick, and later had two daughters.

== Rugby career ==
Both Chris and Paul played rugby union for Eastern Suburbs.

The Dawson brothers switched codes to play rugby league for the Newtown Jets in 1972. Chris Dawson played in the second row along with Paul for the Newtown Jets club for five seasons. The Dawson brothers were part of the 1973 New South Wales Rugby League Club Championship winning team.

== Subsequent career ==
After their rugby league careers finished, both Chris and Paul Dawson became physical education teachers at public high schools on the Northern Beaches and North Shore of Sydney. Dawson was teaching at Cromer High School in 1980 when he commenced a sexual relationship with a 16-year-old pupil, Joanne Curtis, while he was married to Lynette Dawson.

The Dawson brothers and families moved to Queensland in 1985. Chris Dawson worked at Keebra Park State High School first then later moved to Coombabah State High School to work with his brother Paul.

In 2003 Dawson was working at St Ursula's College in Yeppoon, Queensland before being fired from his job during the 2003 coronial inquest on Lynette's death.

== Criminal convictions ==
=== Wife's murder ===
Dawson's wife Lynette went missing in January 1982. Two days after Lynette's disappearance, Dawson invited Joanne Curtis to move into the family house. He reported his wife missing on 18 February 1982, six weeks after her disappearance, claiming she had left after marital problems and had joined a commune. He finalised divorce proceedings against Lynette in 1983.

Dawson married Joanne Curtis in 1984. The couple divorced in 1993.

Lynette's body has never been found but two coronial inquests were conducted in 2001 and 2003 with both ruling that Lynette Dawson must be dead and was most likely murdered by a known person.

Dawson was the main subject of an investigative podcast series, The Teacher's Pet, by journalist Hedley Thomas. Thomas investigated allegations about the disappearance of Lynette and brought Dawson into renewed public and media focus through the podcast's broadcast in 2018. As of December 2018, the Gold Walkley-award-winning podcast was downloaded 28 million times. The series was temporarily removed from download in Australia in April 2019, "to help ensure that Chris Dawson gets a fair trial".

On 5 December 2018, Dawson was arrested by detectives from Queensland Police for the murder of Lynette Dawson. He was extradited to New South Wales on 6 December 2018 to face trial. In his appearance at Sydney's Central Local Court that day, he was refused bail and was remanded in custody. On 17 December 2018, Dawson was granted bail and his family paid A$1.5 million bail for him to be released. Appearing in the Local Court of New South Wales in June 2019, Dawson pleaded not guilty to the murder of Lynette Dawson. In February 2020, Dawson was committed to stand trial for the murder of Lynette. His arraignment was set for April, with a potential trial date later in 2020.

On 30 August 2022, Dawson was found guilty of murdering Lynette in 1982, after a judge only trial in the Supreme Court of New South Wales.

On 2 December 2022, Dawson was sentenced to 24 years in jail, with a non-parole period of 18 years, for the murder of Lynette.

In May 2024, Dawson's appeal against his conviction commenced. His appeal was dismissed on 13 June 2024.

=== Carnal knowledge of a student ===
In May 2023, Dawson faced charges related to carnal knowledge (a historical offence replaced in 1986) of a student in his class, known for the purposes of the trial as "AB". In a judge-only trial, he was found guilty by judge Sarah Huggett on 28 June 2023. On 15 September 2023, he was sentenced to imprisonment for three years, with a non-parole period of two years, with the sentence to begin in August 2039 after the completion of his murder sentence.

In September 2023, Dawson's victim, launched a civil case in the NSW Supreme Court against the NSW Department of Education for negligence, claiming it breached its duty of care to her, failed to investigate Dawson, and allowed him to remain a teacher at the school "notwithstanding the common knowledge that he was sexually abusing a pupil". The matter was settled in December 2023.
