= Pittwater =

Estuary in Sydney, Australia

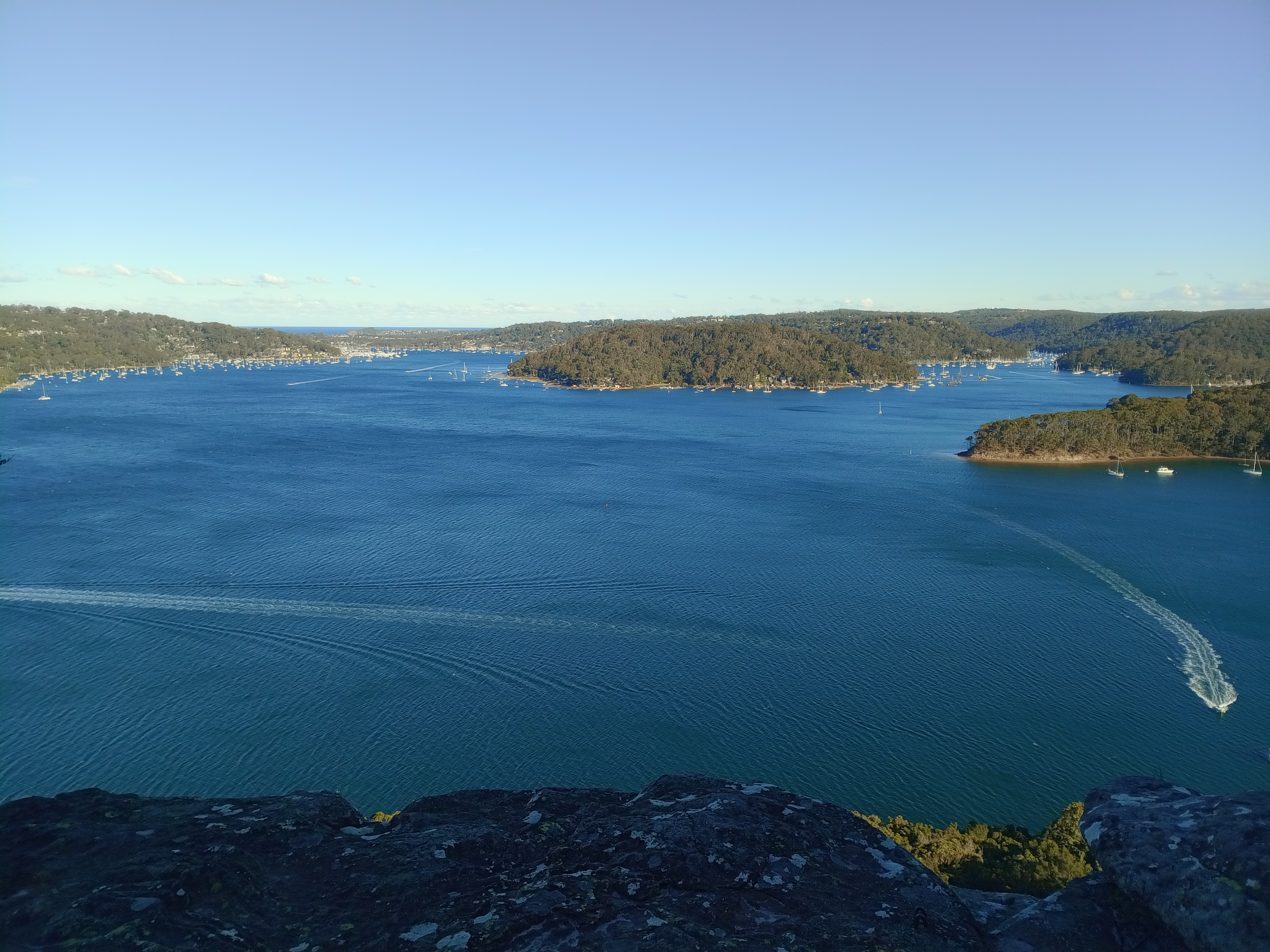
- A view of the southern portion of Pittwater.
- Etymology: William Pitt the Younger

Location
- Country: Australia
- State: New South Wales
- Region: Greater Metropolitan Sydney
- Municipality: Northern Beaches Council

Physical characteristics
- Source: McCarrs Creek
  - location: north of Church Point
  - coordinates: 33°38′38.3994″S 151°16′55.2″E
- 2nd source: Cahill Creek
  - location: Mona Vale
  - coordinates: 33°39′59.3994″S 151°18′41.3994″E
- Mouth: Broken Bay
  - location: West Head and Barrenjoey Head
  - coordinates: 33°34′47.9994″S 151°18′57.6″E
- Length: 10 km (6.2 mi)
- Basin size: 50.8 km^{2} (19.6 sq mi)

Basin features
- River system: Hawkesbury–Nepean
- Tributaries
  - left: Bilgola Creek
  - right: McMahon's Creek, Careel Creek
- Island: Scotland Island

Pittwater is a semi-mature tide dominated drowned valley estuary, located about 40 kilometres (25 mi) north of the Sydney central business district, New South Wales, Australia; being one of the bodies of water that separates Greater Metropolitan Sydney from the Central Coast.

Pittwater has its origin from the confluence of McCarrs Creek, to the west of Church Point and a number of smaller estuaries, the largest of which is Cahill Creek, that joins the Pittwater north of Mona Vale. The Pittwater is an open body of water, often considered a bay or harbour, that flows north towards its mouth into Broken Bay, between West Head and Barrenjoey Head, less than 1 kilometre (0.62 mi) from the Tasman Sea.

The total area of the Pittwater is 18.4 square kilometres (7.1 sq mi) and around ninety percent of the area is generally administered by the Hawkesbury–Nepean Catchment Management Authority, in conjunction with Northern Beaches Council.

The land adjacent to the Pittwater was occupied for many thousands of years by the Kuringgai peoples, an Aboriginal Australian grouping of uncertain origin. They used the river as an important source of food and a place for trade.

Pittwater was named Pitt Water in 1788 in honour of William Pitt the Younger, the then Prime Minister of Great Britain.

== Geography ==
Pittwater extends from Mona Vale and Warriewood in the south, along the eastern ridge of the Barrenjoey Peninsula leading to Palm Beach and along the western ridge of the Lambert Peninsula leading to West Head. The peninsula was named after Commodore Rowley Lambert RN, Commander-in-Chief of the Royal Navy's Australia Station from 1867 to 1870. The eastern parts of the catchment are largely urbanised whilst the western parts are primarily Ku-ring-gai Chase National Park. Within the Pittwater lies Careel Bay, Refuge Cove, Saltpan Cove, Horseshoe Cove, Crystal Bay, McCarrs Creek, Browns Bay, Elvina Bay, Lovett Bay, Towlers Bay, Portuguese Bay, Coasters Retreat and The Basin. Scotland Island is located within the estuary.

Pittwater contains a diversity of estuarine habitat types including mangrove wetlands, saltmarsh, sand flats and seagrass meadows, including threatened areas of coastal saltmarsh.

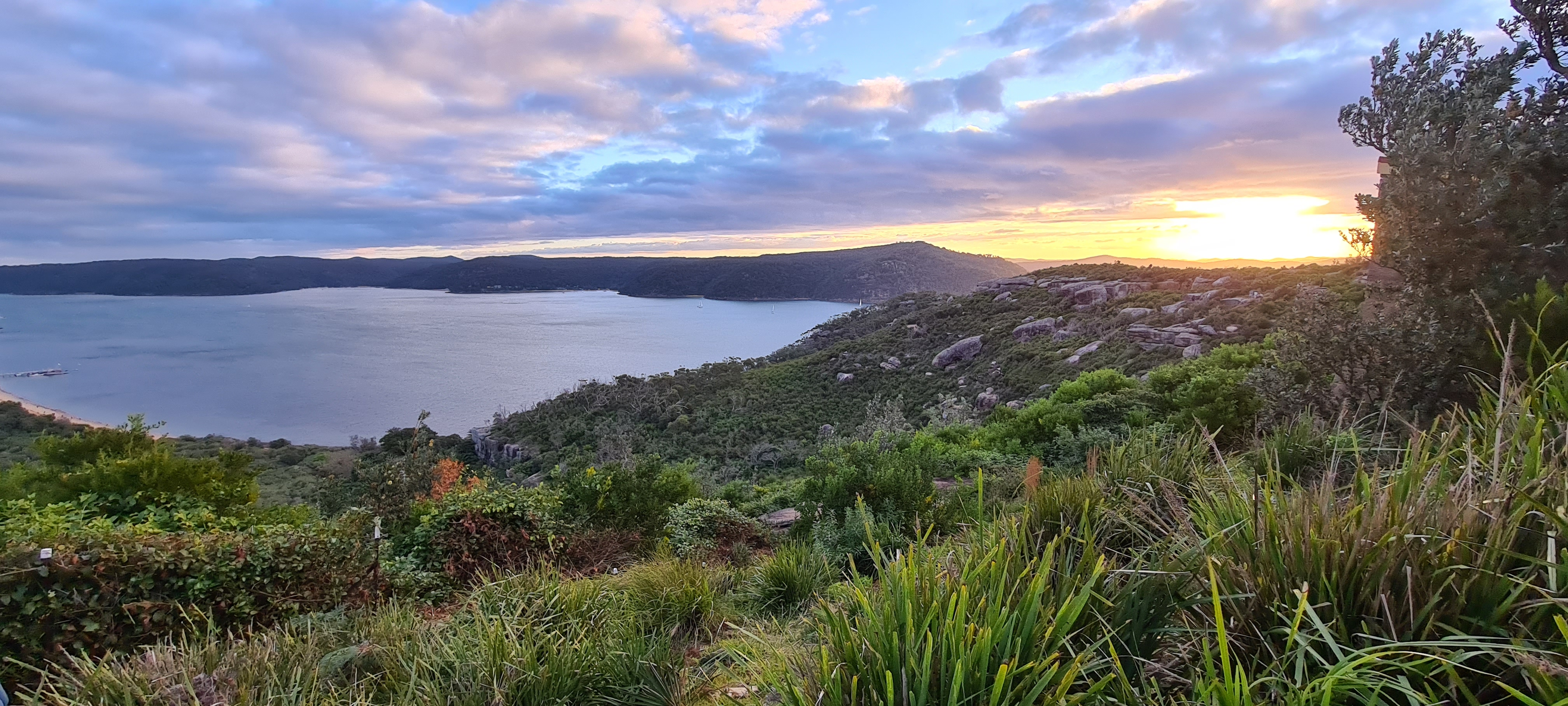
Sunset view west across Pittwater from Barrenjoey Head, showing Ku-ring-gai Chase National Park on the western shoreline.

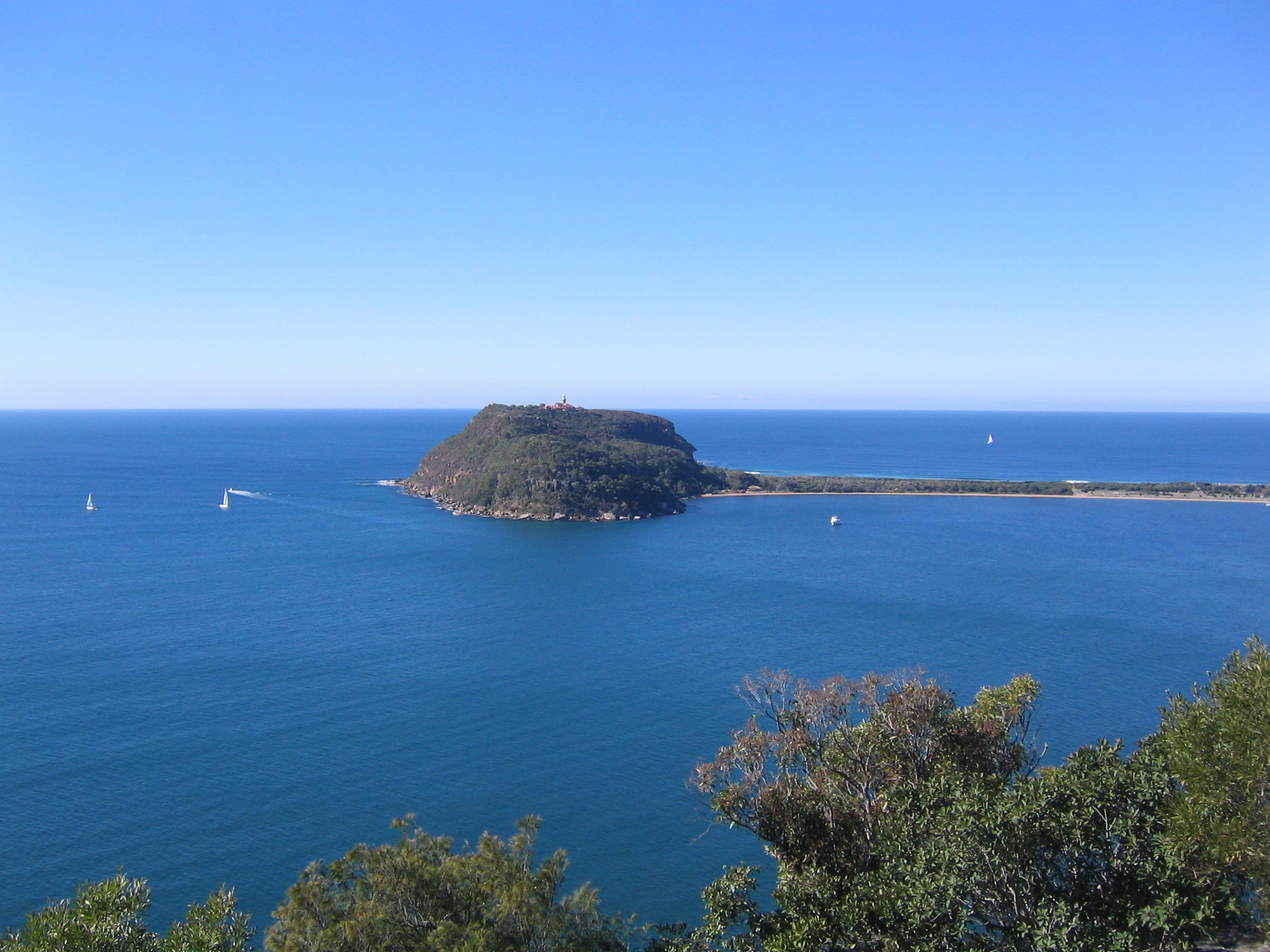
View east across Pittwater from West Head, showing Barrenjoey Head, the southern head of the mouth of the Hawkesbury, and Palm Beach

== History ==
=== Aboriginal history ===
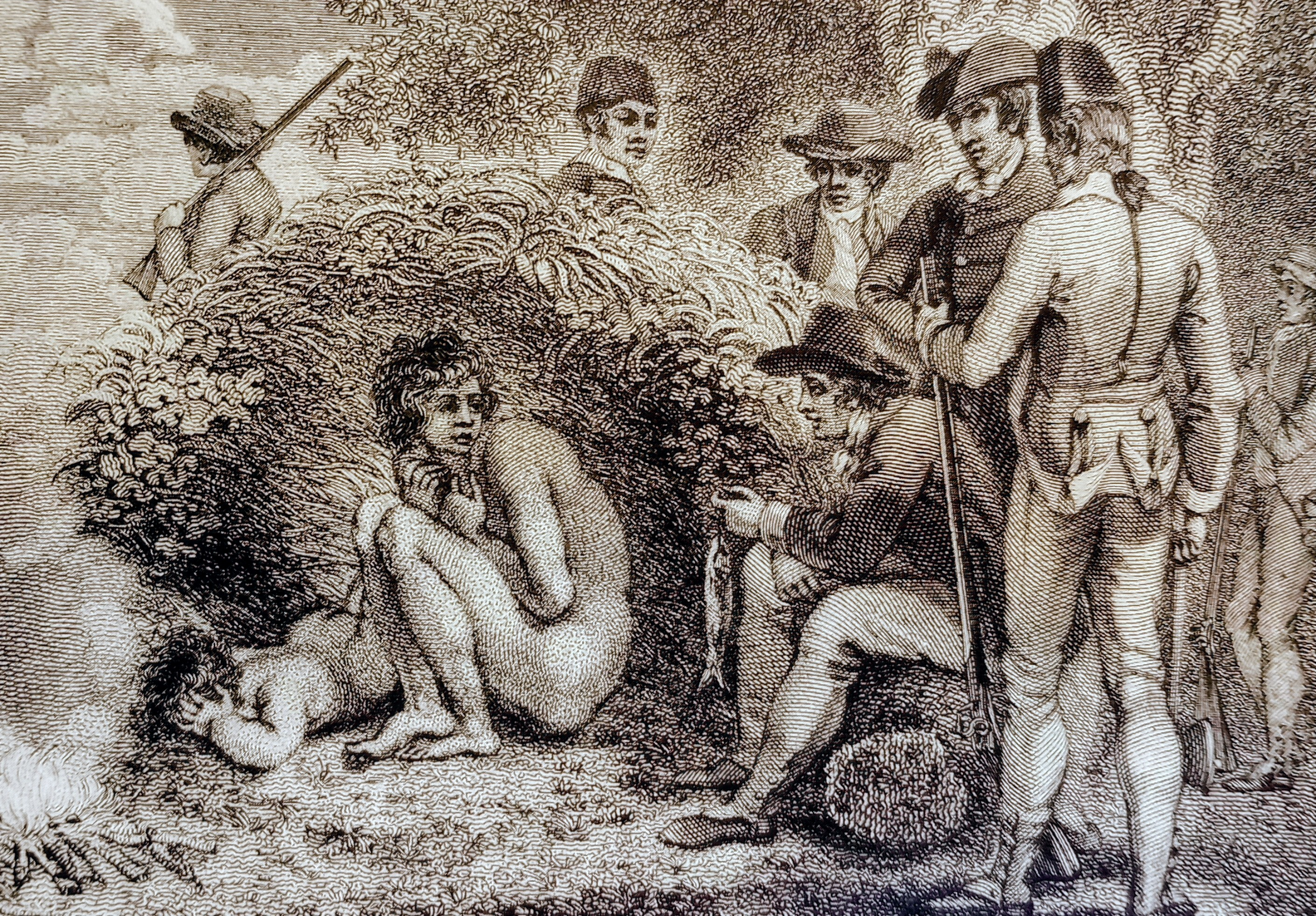
Sketch by Captain John Hunter of the encounter with a Garigal woman suffering from smallpox at Pittwater in 1789

The Dharug peoples were the traditional inhabitants of the land and waterways north and south of Sydney Harbour, from Botany Bay in the south, inland along the Parramatta River and through the Lane Cove River and toward Broken Bay and Brisbane Water where the lands of the Awabakal people overlapped. Amongst the Dharug and Awabakal there were many smaller units called clans, of which the Garigal were most prominent in the area surrounding Pittwater and the Northern Beaches. During 1789 the impact of smallpox on aboriginal peoples led to extensive mortality, with the death rate estimated at somewhere between 50% and 90%. Conservatively, between 500 and 1000 Aboriginal people died on the coastal strip bounded by Botany Bay and Broken Bay. A significant proportion of these were Garigal.

=== European history ===
The waterway was surveyed by crew members of HMS Sirius in 1788, and named Pitt Water after William Pitt the Younger, the then Prime Minister of Great Britain. The first regular water transport across Pittwater was the cutter Francis which carried settlers and farm produce from Sydney between 1793 and 1800. By 1803 a fleet of privately owned coasters had begun operating between Pittwater, Cowan Creek and Berowra Waters, usually travelling in convoy to reduce the risk of piracy by escaped convicts living along the shore. These vessels were generally built on Scotland Island and were not sufficiently seaworthy to leave Broken Bay. A customs house operated from Pittwater between 1843 and 1900, and a government-built sandstone lighthouse was completed at Barrenjoey in 1881. Both the Old Customs House and the lighthouse are listed on the Register of the National Estate.

Shipping declined as a transport medium following road and rail construction through the region between 1850 and 1890, especially the construction of a rail bridge over the Hawkesbury River in 1899. The last locally constructed shipping vessel was launched from a shipyard at Blackwall in 1912, and scheduled shipping services ceased in 1914. However, since the 1950s, Pittwater has become predominantly residential in character and is a suburban region of Sydney. The greater Sydney metropolis has extended to Palm Beach, Church Point and offshore communities in Pittwater, however its early character has been largely retained.

== Current use and activities ==
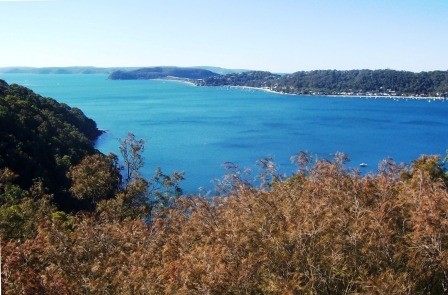
Pittwater from Ku-ring-gai Chase National Park.

Today, the Pittwater is a popular water recreation, such as sailing and fishing. The area is an important natural heritage area that comprises wetlands, bushland, lagoons, a waterway, rock platforms and beaches.

The Pittwater to Coffs Harbour Yacht Race is held in January annually, and has been since 1981. However, in 2016 the race was held as Pittwater to Southport (in Queensland) since the facilities at Coffs Harbour had been badly damaged by East coast storms.

The area gives its name to:

- The former Pittwater Council
- The Electoral district of Pittwater
- Pittwater High School
- Pittwater Park
- Little Pittwater Bay, in Hornsby Shire

== Notable people ==
Chef Pamela Clark resides in Pittwater.

== See also ==
- List of rivers of Australia
- List of rivers of New South Wales (L–Z)
- Rivers of New South Wales
