= Church Point, New South Wales =

Church Point
- Suburb
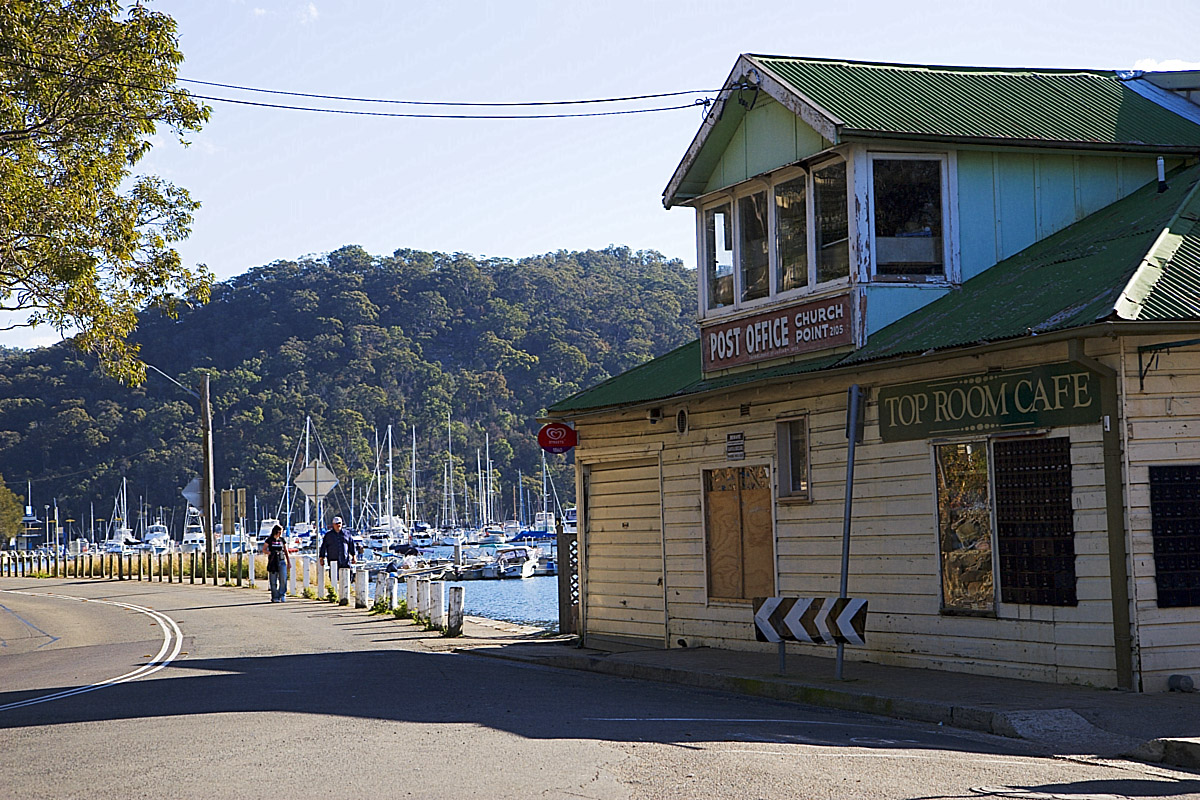
- Church Point Post Office

- Interactive map of Church Point
- Country: Australia
- State: New South Wales
- City: Sydney
- LGA: Northern Beaches Council
- Location: 32 km (20 mi) N of Sydney CBD

Government
  - State electorate: Pittwater
  - Federal division: Mackellar

Area
  - Total: 0.7 km^{2} (0.27 sq mi)
- Elevation: 12 m (39 ft)

Population
  - Total: 1,066 (SAL 2021)
- Postcode: 2105
Suburbs around Church Point
Elvina Bay	Scotland Island	Clareville
Ku-ring-gai Chase National Park	Church Point	Newport
Ingleside	Bayview	Mona Vale

Church Point is a suburb in the Northern Beaches region of Sydney, in the state of New South Wales, Australia. Church Point is 32 kilometres north of the Sydney central business district, in the local government area of Northern Beaches Council.

== History ==
Thomas Langford was the first settler in the area who acquired 40 acres (160,000 m^{2}) in 1852. The area was originally known as Chapel Point because it was the site of a Wesleyan Chapel built in 1872 on land given by William Oliver.

=== Early Subdivision Plans ===
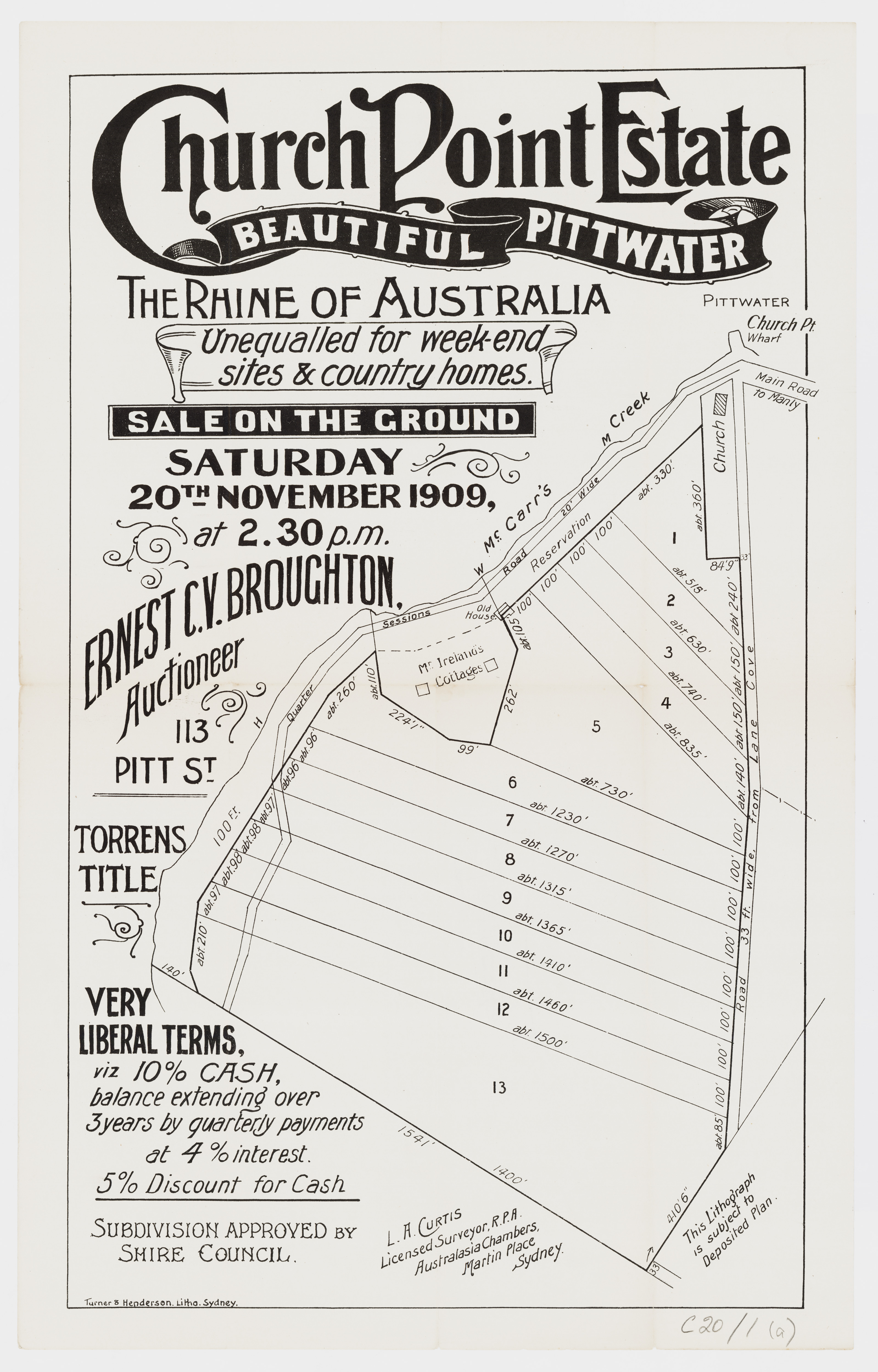
Church Point Estate Pittwater – Quarter Session Rd, Lane Cove, 1909

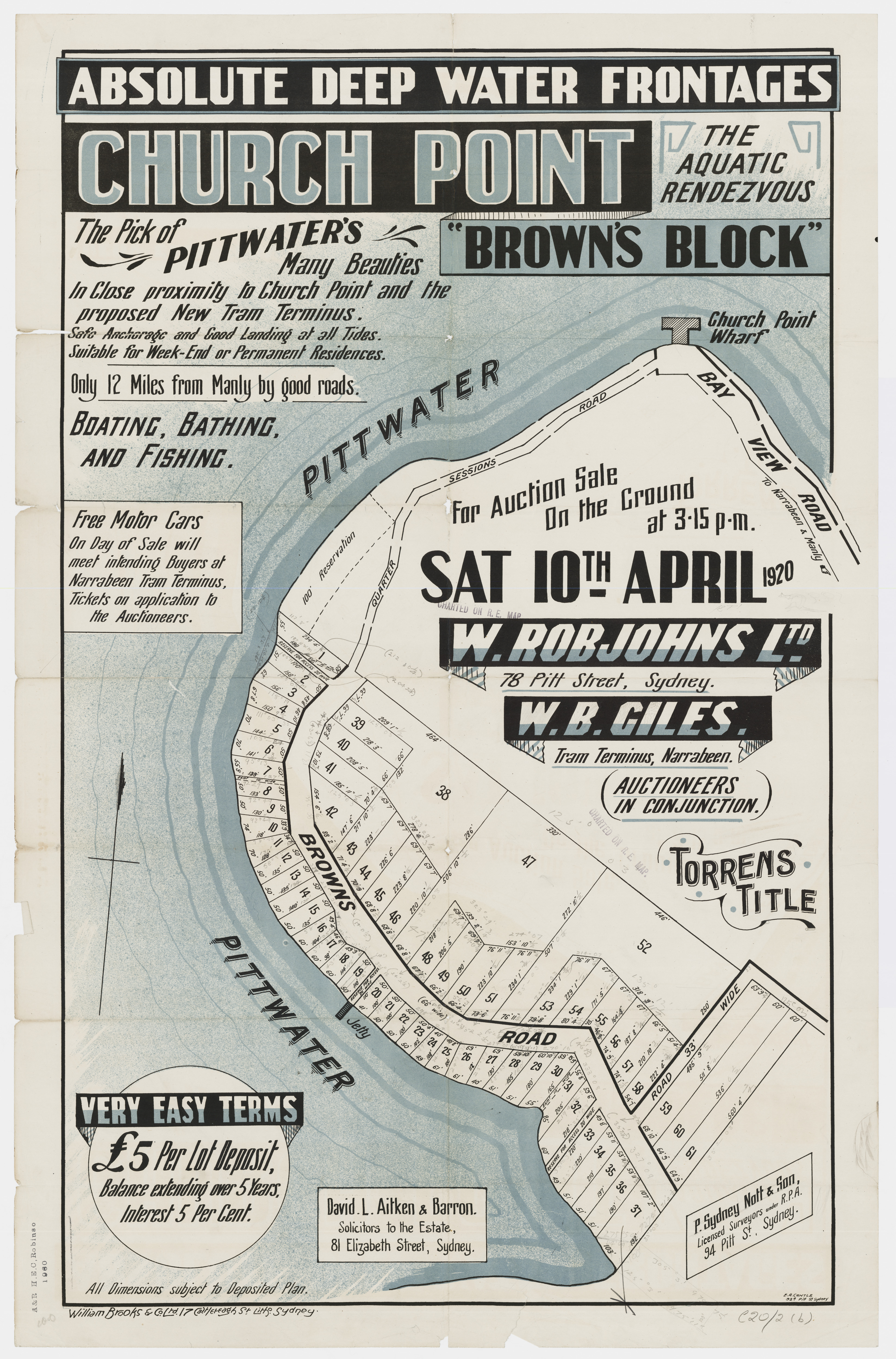
Church Point "Browns Block" Pittwater – Browns Rd, Quarter Session Rd, Bay View Rd, 1920

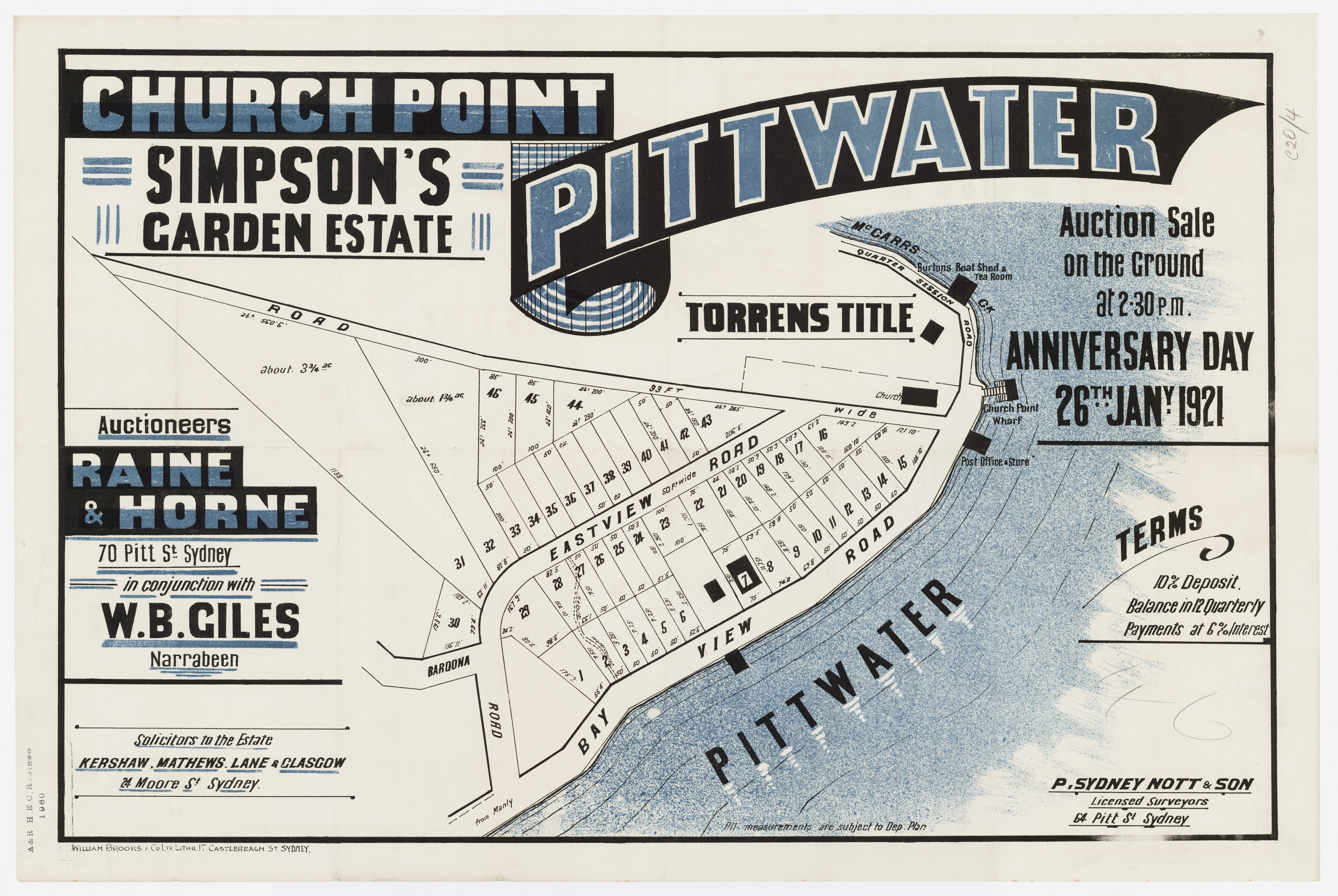
Simpson's Garden Estate Church Point Pittwater – Baroona Rd, Bay View Rd, Eastview Road, 1921

== Demographics ==
According to the 2021 census, there were 1,066 residents in Church Point. The most common ancestries in Church Point were English 47.5%, Australian 28.8%, Irish 13.5%, Scottish 13.3% and German 4.4%. 63.0% of people were born in Australia, the next most common countries of birth were England at 12.2%, the United States of America 2.3%, New Zealand 2.2%, South Africa 2.0%, and Scotland 1.2%. 88.6% of people spoke only English at home with the next most common languages spoken at home being Mandarin 1.6%, German 0.7%, Slovak 0.5%, Spanish 0.4%, and Russian 0.4%. The most common responses for religion in Church Point were No Religion 45.9%, Anglican 19.2%, Catholic 13.7, and Uniting Church 2.7%; a further 7.4% of respondents elected not to disclose their religion.

The median weekly household income was $3,182, much higher than the national median of $1,746. Average monthly mortgage payments were $3,600, compared to the national average of $1,863.

== Transport ==
Pittwater Road is Church Point's main thoroughfare and ends in the suburb.

The Church Point ferry wharf is in McCarrs Creek Road near the post office from where the Church Point Ferry service departs to Scotland Island, Pittwater Youth Hostel, Lovett Bay and Elvina Bay.
