= Fincorp =

- Type: Private
- Industry: Property investment
- Defunct: 23 March 2007
- Fate: Collapsed; entered administration
- Headquarters: Australia
- Key people: Eric Krecichwost (Founder)
- Products: Property investment schemes; debenture notes
- Services: Property finance and development funding

Fincorp was an Australian property and investment company that collapsed in March 2007. The company promised investors a return of up to 9.25% p.a., but, upon collapse, owed around 8000 investors over A$200 million.

== Collapse and administration ==
The Fincorp group entered administration on 23 March 2007, with KordaMentha appointed to oversee all Fincorp entities. At the time, the company owed approximately A$200 million to more than 8,000 investors, including both secured and unsecured noteholders. Many investors were retirees who had allocated significant portions of their savings to Fincorp products.

The collapse followed increasing financial pressure, including negative cash flow and reliance on complex inter-company funding arrangements. Fincorp’s business model involved raising funds from investors and directing them into property developments that were also financed through senior bank debt, which took priority over investor claims. As a result, recoveries for investors depended heavily on the performance and valuation of underlying property assets.

== Investigations and findings ==
Investigations by administrators identified extensive deficiencies in corporate governance, financial reporting and internal controls. Records were incomplete or missing, including board minutes prior to 2005, and the group failed to maintain consistent monthly management accounts. Administrators also reported inadequate financial modelling and forecasting, as well as insufficiently skilled staff to manage a complex property portfolio.

Evidence suggested that Fincorp may have been trading while insolvent in the months leading up to its collapse. Investigators examined a large volume of material, including electronic records and internal communications, in order to trace the company’s financial position and decision-making processes.

The administrators further identified a range of transactions that could be subject to legal challenge, including uncommercial dealings, preferential payments and loans involving directors and related parties. Significant payments were made to founder Eric Krecichwost and associates through commissions, loans and other benefits, including millions of dollars in "spotter fees". In addition, senior executives were reported to have negotiated substantial remuneration increases shortly before the collapse.

== Regulatory action ==
The Australian Securities and Investments Commission (ASIC) initiated a wide-ranging investigation into the conduct of Fincorp’s directors, officers and advisers following the collapse. As part of these efforts, ASIC obtained asset-freezing orders from the Supreme Court of New South Wales against directors, their spouses and associated entities in order to preserve assets for potential recovery.

ASIC worked in conjunction with administrators to maximise returns to investors and to assess the availability of legal claims, including possible breaches of the Corporations Act and grounds for compensation. The investigation also considered the role of external advisers, including auditors and trustees, in the governance of the group.

== Investor losses and recovery ==
At the time of collapse, secured noteholders were owed approximately $178 million and unsecured investors around $23 million. The sale of Fincorp’s property assets was expected to return around 50 cents in the dollar to secured investors, with no immediate recovery anticipated for unsecured noteholders absent further legal action.

The collapse formed part of a broader series of failures among Australian property investment schemes, affecting thousands of investors and prompting regulatory scrutiny of the sector. Many investors had been drawn to such schemes by high-advertised returns compared with traditional bank deposits.

== Litigation and settlements ==
In the years following the collapse, legal proceedings were initiated against various parties connected to Fincorp, including trustees and former directors. A class action brought on behalf of investors resulted in a Federal Court-approved settlement of $29 million covering more than 5,000 claimants.

The litigation alleged that the trustee company breached its duties by failing to act on warning signs of the group’s deteriorating financial position. The case was one of the first successful actions against a trustee under strengthened legal duties introduced by the Corporations Act.

Distributions from the settlement varied depending on the timing of investments, with later investors receiving higher proportions of their losses. For unsecured investors, the settlement represented the first recovery of funds following the collapse.

== Aftermath ==
The collapse of Fincorp had significant consequences for investors and individuals associated with the company. Founder Eric Krecichwost was later convicted and sentenced to imprisonment in connection with his role in the company’s failure. Former chief executive Craig Stubbs left the company in 2007 and subsequently described the collapse as having severe personal and professional impacts.

The failure also contributed to increased scrutiny of debenture-style investment schemes and the marketing of high-yield financial products to retail investors.
