= Scotland Island =

Island suburb of Sydney, Australia

Coordinates: 33°38′24″S 151°17′28″E

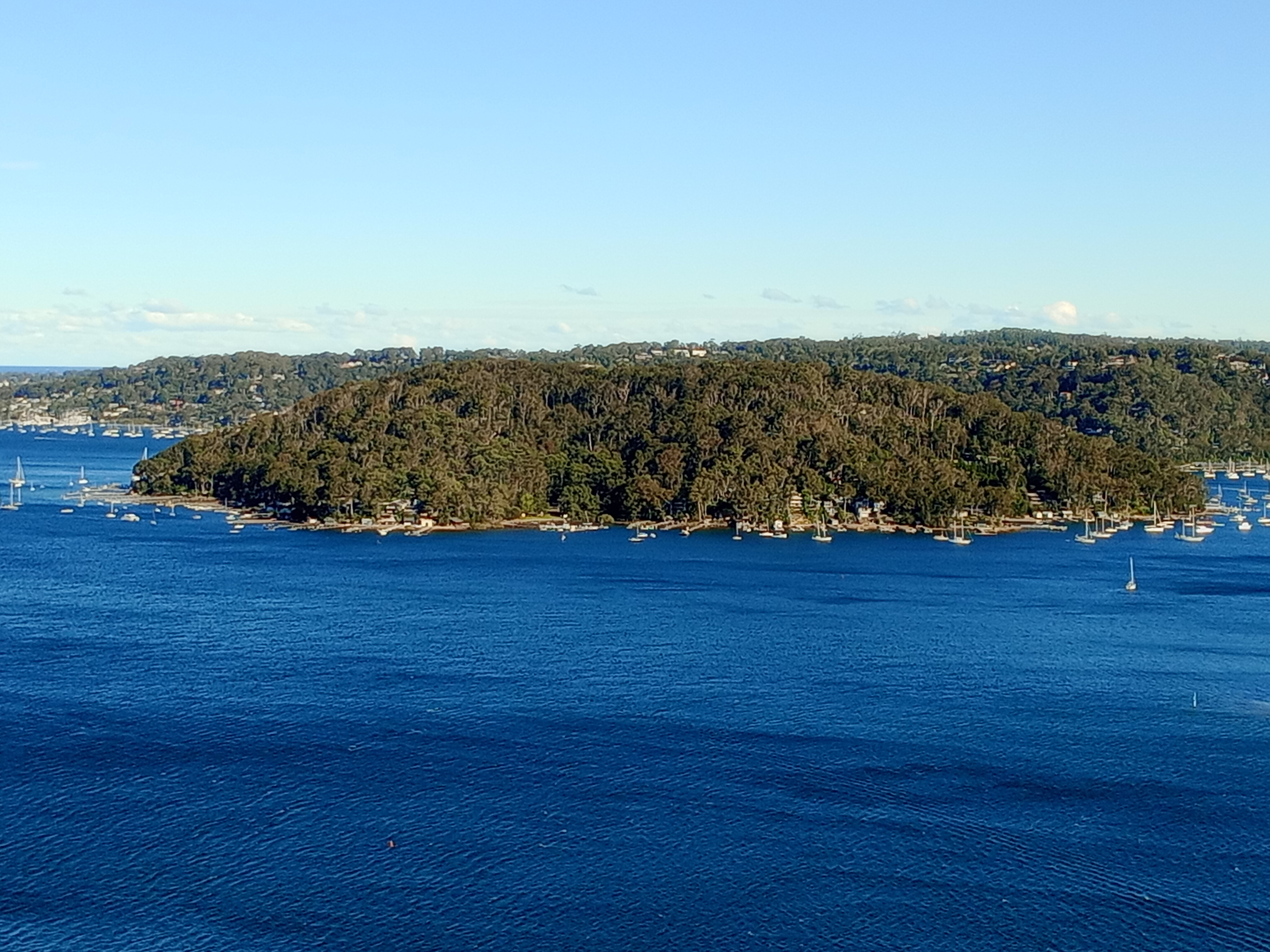
Scotland Island viewed from Bairnes Lookout

Flag of Scotland Island since 1996

Scotland Island is an island and suburb on the Northern Beaches of Sydney, in the state of New South Wales, Australia. Church Point, Scotland Island's major mainland service locality, is located 32 kilometres (20 mi) north of the Sydney central business district, in the local government area of Northern Beaches Council. In 2021 it had a population of 711.

== Geography and geology ==
Scotland Island is located in Pittwater, off Church Point. The island is approximately 1 km in diameter and its highest point is over 90 metres above sea level. To the east is the suburb of Newport, west is Ku-ring-gai Chase National Park, and south are the suburbs of Church Point and Bayview.

Around 18,000 years ago Scotland Island was a hill in a river valley. Following the last ice age, sea levels rose, flooding the valley, forming Pittwater and creating the island. There are many small beaches, consisting mainly of mud, mangroves and rocks. There are no rivers or cliffs, but some small caves towards the top of the island. The top of the island is sandstone and the lower part consists of sedimentary rocks from the Narrabeen group.

== History ==
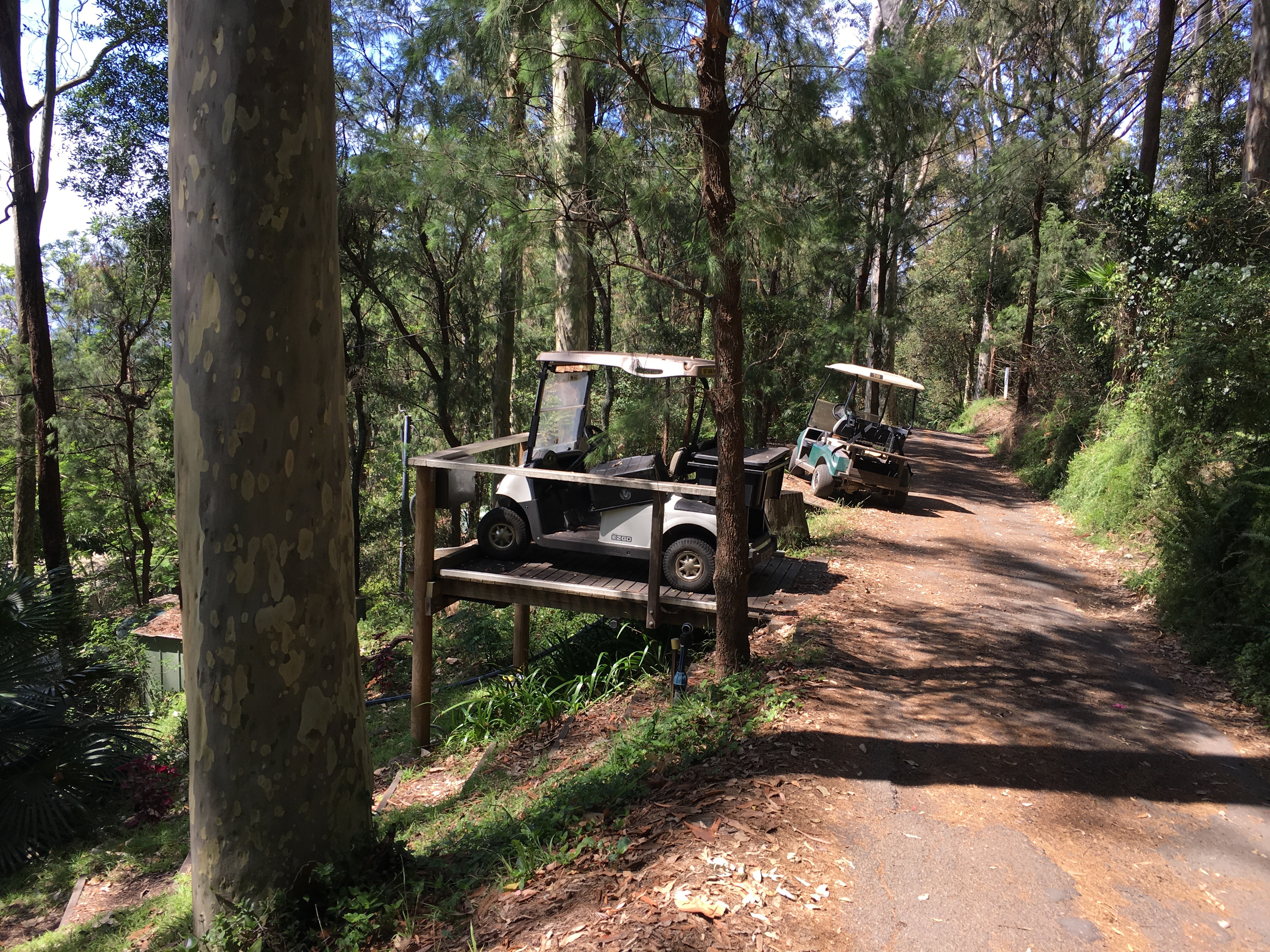

Shortly after the establishment of the penal colony at Sydney Cove, the area was explored by Governor Phillip, who named the island after William Pitt, the British prime minister at the time. The first European settler to own land on the island was Andrew Thompson, who renamed it Scotland Island after his homeland. He created a successful salt works and built boats until his death in 1810. The island as a whole was sold several times in the nineteenth century before being sub-divided and sold off in lots in 1906. Around 1900, salt was still being extracted from seawater near what is now known as Tennis Court Wharf. Using an oil burner, about 90 kg were extracted each week.

Sheep farms had been located on the island at one time, but permanent residents began to move in after power was connected in 1962. Now, the majority of people living there commute to work on the mainland.

There are many Aboriginal middens on the island including one in Catherine Park, estimated at 3,500 years old.

== Community ==
Scotland Island is one of two inhabited islands in the Sydney area. The island is accessed by the Church Point Ferry and private vessels. Most of the island consists of bushland, with a residential zone of about 350 houses around the perimeter foreshore. There are no shops, cafes or industrial zones.

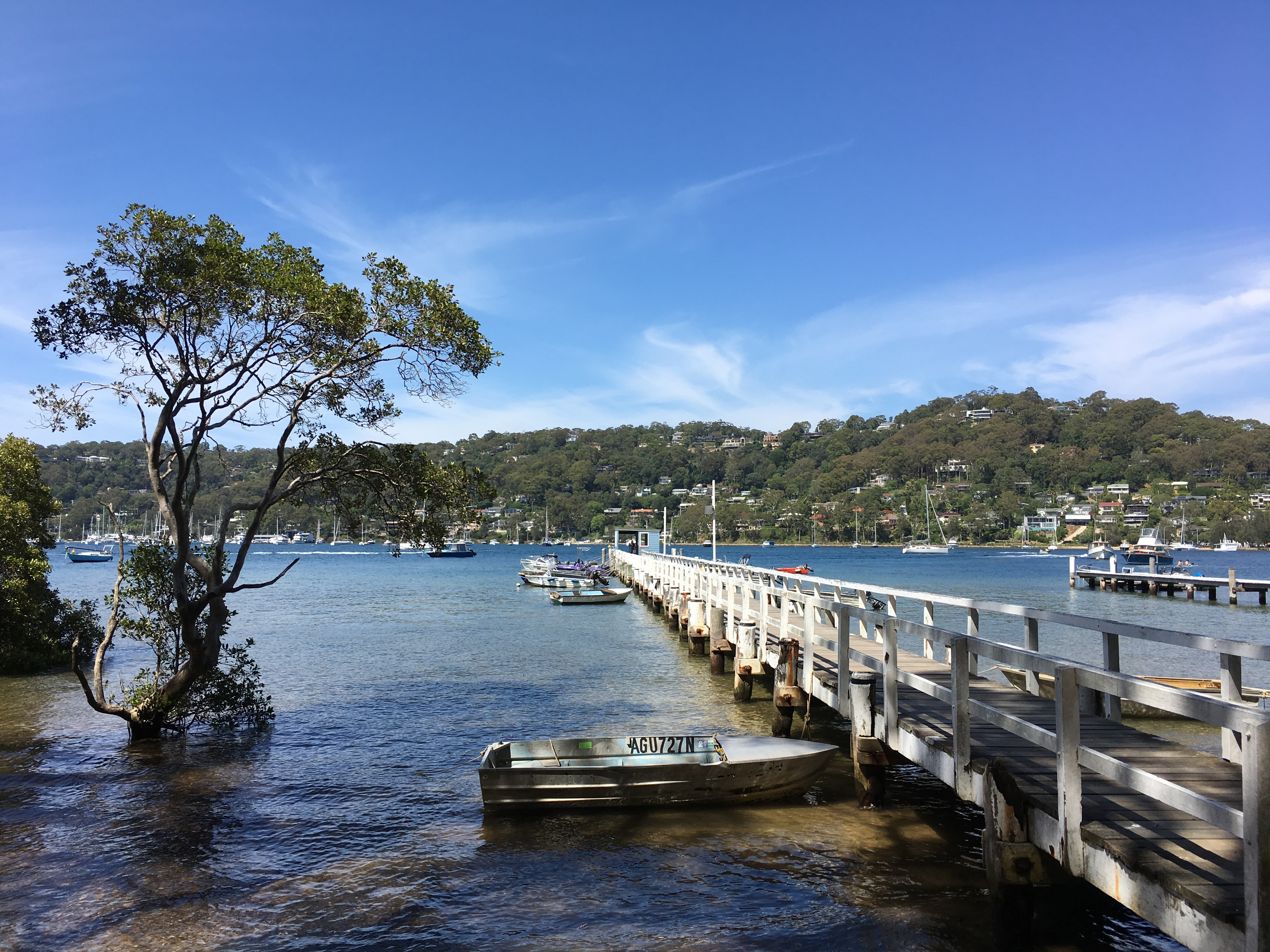
The jetty in Scotland Island

The non-residential buildings are a kindergarten, Community Hall and Fire Station. The Child Centre and Community Hall were built by the residents in the 1980s and 1990s and are used for various purposes. Community groups on the island include a regular discussion group and an international folk dancing group. In 2006, an arts and film festival was organised on the island by the community. A fire in an art gallery in neighbouring Newport destroyed a collection of artworks created by artists living on Scotland Island and the offshore communities of Pittwater.

There is no road access to the island, so the volunteer fire brigade fulfill a number of essential services normally performed by full-time emergency service personnel in other areas of Sydney. The Scotland Island Rural Fire Brigade (SIRFB) is made up of volunteers: about 30 active (firefighting) members and about another 30 associate (non-firefighting) members.

In the 2021 census, there were 711 people on Scotland Island. 63.2% were born in Australia, the next most common countries of birth included England 9.4%, New Zealand 3.1%, the United States of America 2.7%, Canada 1.3%, and France 1.1%. 84% spoke only English at home, the next most common languages spoken at home included German 2.3%, French 2.1%, Italian 1.4%, Spanish 0.7%, and Portuguese 0.6%. The most common responses for religion were No Religion 61%, Catholic 12%, Anglican 9.1% and Uniting Church 1.5%; a further 7.7% of respondents elected not to disclose their religion.

Scotland Island is a renowned hub for Sydney artists and musicians. Notable residents include Continental Rob Suzs from 1980s Sydney soulsters, The Dynamic Hepnotics, and blues and roots singer Jackie Marshall.

== Notable people ==
- Kristina Keneally, former New South Wales premier and Labor Senator. Keneally and her family moved to Liverpool prior to contesting the local seat of Fowler at the 2022 federal election, but returned full time to the Island after her failure to win the seat.
- Lime Cordiale members Oliver and Louis Leimbach grew up on Scotland Island.

== Popular culture ==
Scotland Island was used as a location in Australian mystery/crime writer Peter Corris novel "The Greenwich Apartments", but was renamed Shetland Island.

== Climate ==
Climate is characterised by relatively high temperatures and evenly distributed precipitation throughout the year. Summers are usually somewhat wetter than winters, with much of the rainfall coming from convectional thunderstorm activity. The Köppen Climate Classification subtype for this climate is Cfa, humid subtropical climate.

Climate data for Scotland Island, New South Wales
Month	Jan	Feb	Mar	Apr	May	Jun	Jul	Aug	Sep	Oct	Nov	Dec	Year
Mean daily maximum °C (°F)	26 (78)	26 (78)	24 (76)	22 (72)	19 (66)	17 (62)	16 (60)	17 (63)	19 (67)	22 (71)	23 (74)	25 (77)	21 (70)
Mean daily minimum °C (°F)	18 (65)	18 (65)	17 (63)	14 (58)	11 (52)	9 (48)	8 (46)	9 (48)	11 (51)	13 (56)	15 (59)	17 (63)	13 (56)
Average precipitation mm (inches)	99 (3.9)	110 (4.3)	130 (5.1)	120 (4.7)	120 (4.7)	130 (5.1)	89 (3.5)	71 (2.8)	58 (2.3)	71 (2.8)	81 (3.2)	71 (2.8)	1,150 (45.2)
Source: Weatherbase
