= Pittwater Council =

Former local government area in New South Wales, Australia

- Local government area
- Location in Metropolitan Sydney

- Coordinates: 33.6776°S 151.3039°E
- Country: Australia
- State: New South Wales
- Region: Metropolitan Sydney
- Established: 1 May 1992
- Abolished: 12 May 2016
- Council seat: Mona Vale Memorial Hall

Government
  - Mayor: Jacqui Townsend (Independent)
  - State electorate: Pittwater
  - Federal division: Mackellar

Area
  - Total: 91 km^{2} (35 sq mi)

Population
  - Total: 57,155 (2011 census)
  - Density: 628.1/km^{2} (1,627/sq mi)
- Website: Pittwater Council
LGAs around Pittwater Council
	Broken Bay
Hornsby Shire	Pittwater Council	Tasman Sea
	Warringah Council

Pittwater Council was a local government area on the Northern Beaches of Sydney, in the state of New South Wales, Australia. It covered a region adjacent to the Tasman Sea about 30 kilometres (19 mi) north of the Sydney central business district. The area is named after Pittwater, the body of water adjacent to much of the area governed. First proclaimed in 1906 as the A Riding of Warringah Shire, the area was proclaimed as the Municipality of Pittwater on 1 May 1992. On 12 May 2016, the Minister for Local Government announced that Pittwater Council would be subsumed into the newly formed Northern Beaches Council. The last mayor of Pittwater Council was Councillor Jacqui Townsend, an independent politician.

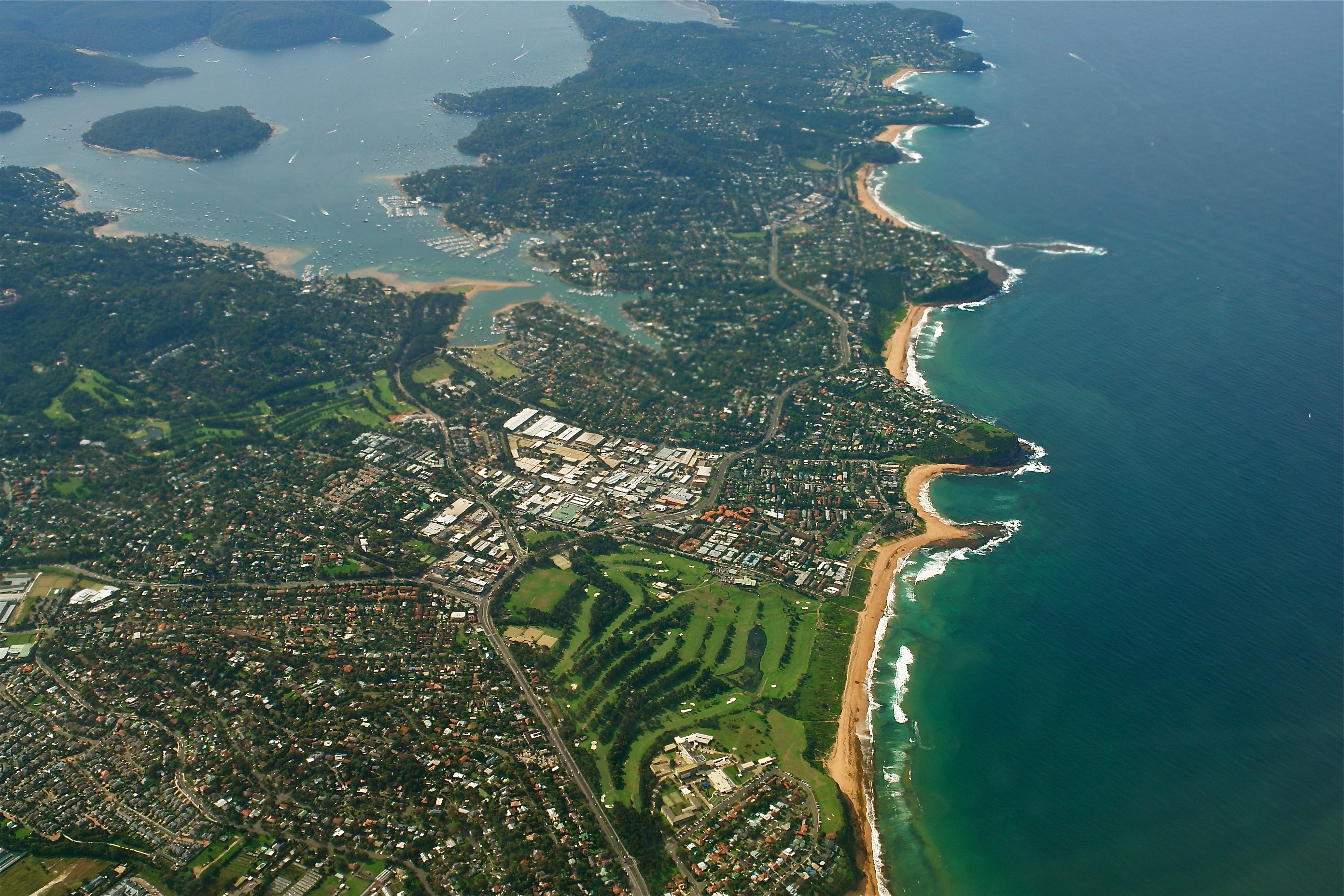
Aerial view of Sydney Northern Beaches

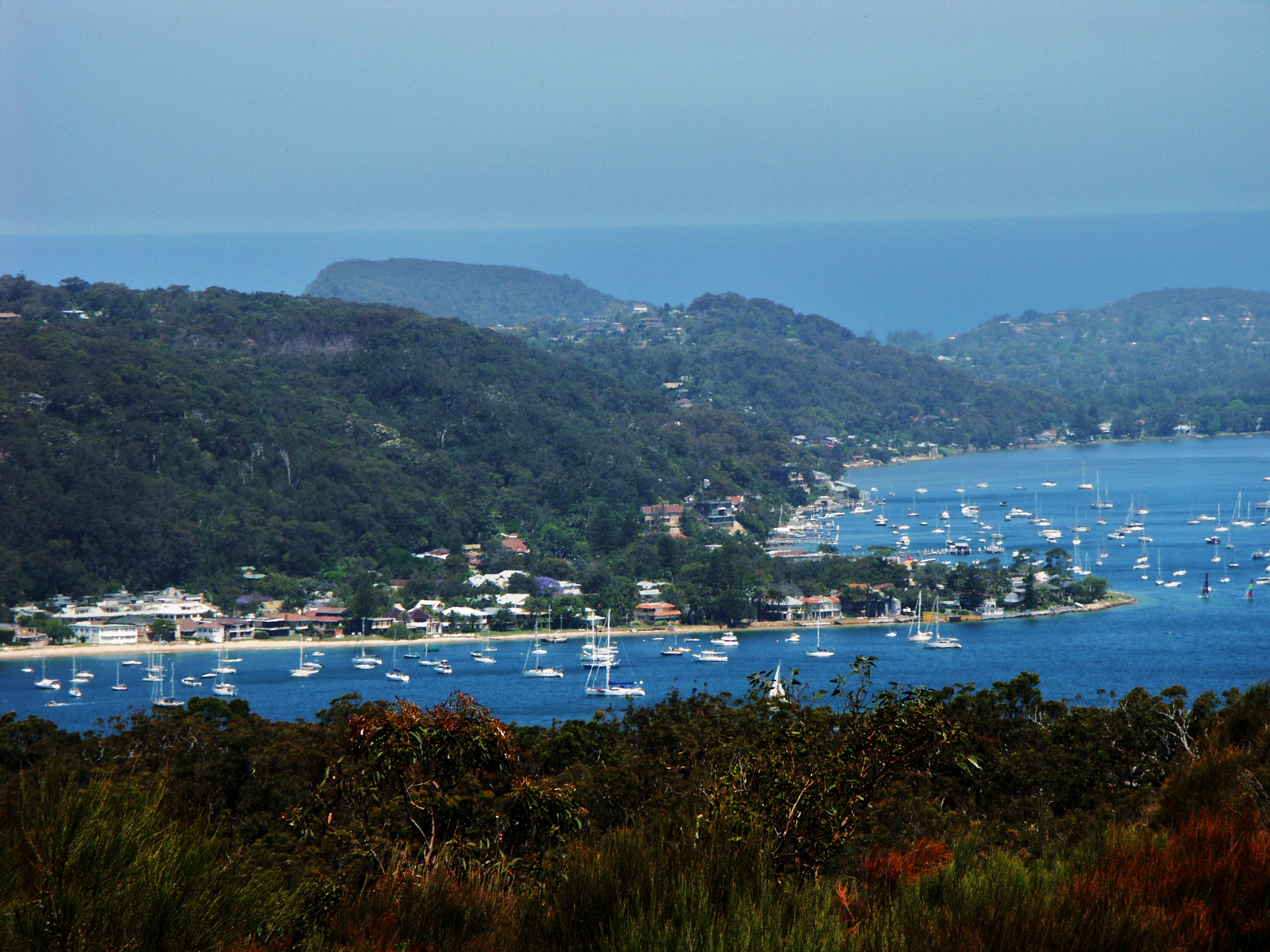
Pittwater - panoramio

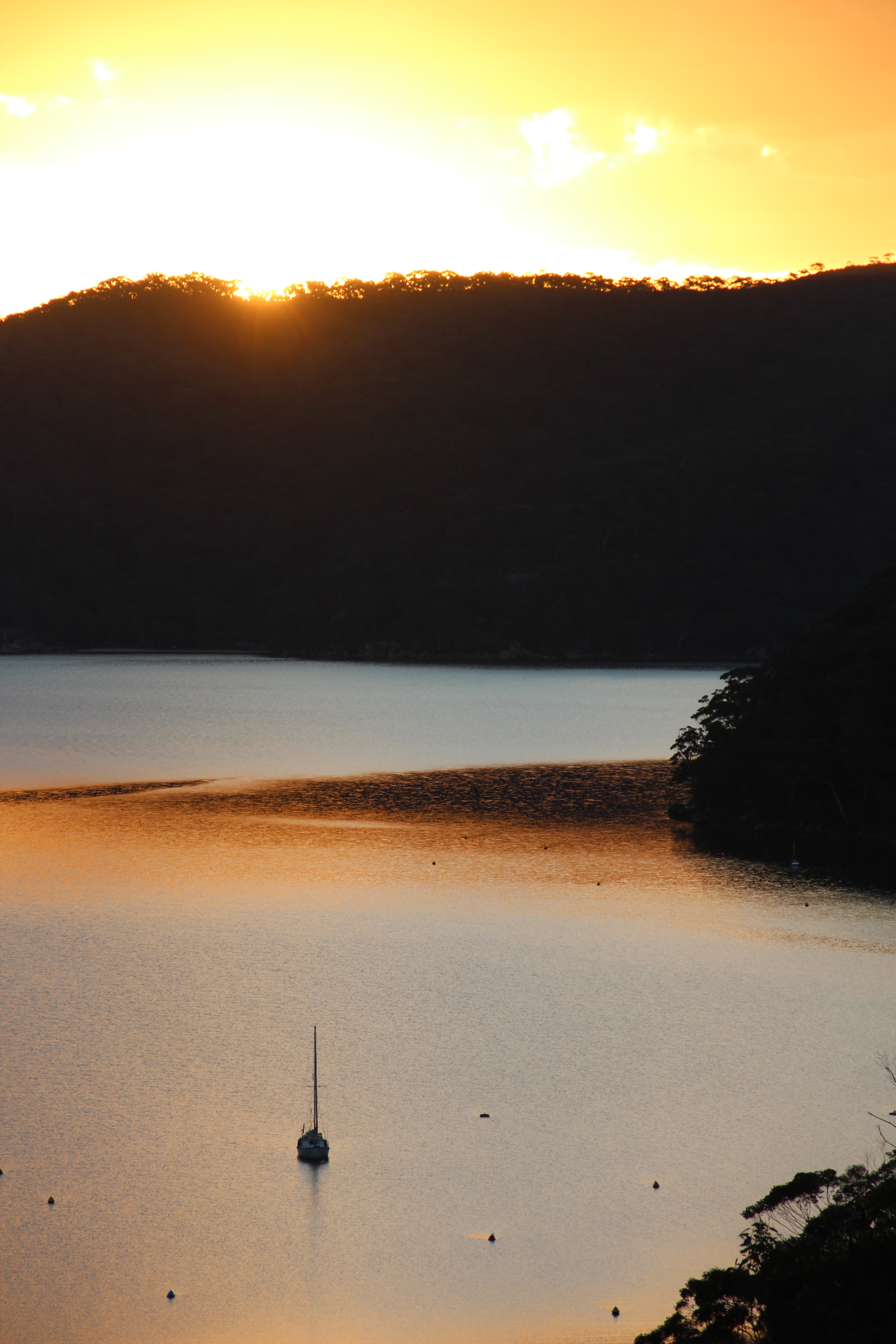
View at dusk looking west from America Bay walking track, Ku-ring-gai Chase National Park. Pittwater, NSW, Australia.

== Suburbs and localities ==
Suburbs and localities serviced by Pittwater Council were:

- Akuna Bay
- Avalon Beach
- Avalon North
- Barrenjoey
- Bayview
- Bilgola Beach
- Bilgola Plateau
- Bungan Beach
- Bungan Head
- Careel Bay
- Careel Head
- Church Point
- Clareville
- Clareville Beach
- Coasters Retreat
- Currawong Beach
- Elanora Heights
- Elvina Bay
- Foleys Hill
- Great Mackerel Beach
- Ingleside
- Ingleside Heights
- Loquat Valley
- Lovett Bay
- McCarrs Creek
- Mona Vale
- Morning Bay
- Newport
- North Narrabeen
- Palm Beach
- Paradise Beach
- Salt Pan Cove
- Sand Point
- Scotland Island
- South Warriewood
- Stokes Point
- Taylors Point
- The Basin
- Towlers Bay
- Tumbledown Dick
- Turimetta
- Warriewood
- Warriewood Beach
- Whale Beach

== History ==
The Pittwater Shire was named after an estuary of Broken Bay which the shire surrounds. Broken Bay forms the mouth of the Hawkesbury River, the main river which formed the Cumberland Plain and Sydney basin. Pittwater was discovered in 1788, the year the first British colony was established in Australia. However, Pittwater and the surrounding region was inhabited for many millennia by local Aboriginal tribes and much evidence of their habitation remains especially their rock etchings in Ku-ring-gai Chase National Park which borders Pittwater's western side. Pittwater was named in about 1800 by the colony's first governor, Arthur Phillip, honouring the then British Prime Minister, William Pitt the Younger.

Pittwater in the early 19th century was developed as a new port with loading and unloading facilities erected at what is now the current Newport public wharf. As the port developed so did local industry such as sheep at Mona Vale, orchards at southern Newport and Church Point, salt from Saltpan cove and Scotland Island. During the period from the 1950s to the early 1970s, sand mining operations were undertaken in the upper reaches of McCarr's Creek. After sand mining operations ceased, the tailings ponds were all that remained of the mining operation. Around the 1850s a school was established on the site of what is now Newport Public school. Over later periods, public (primary) schools were established at Mona Vale, Avalon and Bilgola Plateau. In 1963, Pittwater High School was opened at Mona Vale (located on Pittwater Road), Barrenjoey High School (located at the northern end of Avalon beach) was opened in 1968. During the Second World War, unlike Sydney Harbour (Port Jackson), Pittwater was not protected by a boom net. As a consequence local militia and later Australian Army were stationed at the western side of the entrance to Pittwater and were dispersed along the western shore in a network of trenches, pillboxes and gun emplacements.

Pittwater was first incorporated in 1906 when it was included as the "A Riding" of Warringah Shire Council. However for many years there existed a sentiment held by some in A Riding, the northern Riding and the largest in Warringah, taking up more than 40% of Warringah's land area, that they were being increasingly ignored and subject to what they considered inappropriate development and policies for their area. This culminated in 1991 when a non-compulsory postal poll of the residents of A Riding was taken over the question of a possible secession. This resulted in a 73.5% vote in favour of secession.

The Minister for Local Government at the time, Gerry Peacocke, announced the secession of A Riding from Warringah Council, and thus Pittwater Council was created. On 1 May 1992, The governor of New South Wales, Rear Admiral Peter Sinclair, proclaimed the establishment of the Municipality of Pittwater, the area of which roughly followed the area formerly known as 'A' Riding of the Warringah Shire. Also on that day, the offices of Robert Dunn, Eric Green and Ronald Starr, former Warringah 'A' Riding Councillors, were terminated with those persons forming, with others, a nine-member Provisional Council of the Municipality of Pittwater. Despite the Municipality status requiring the new council members to be titled "Alderman", Pittwater obtain the permission of Minister Peacocke to continue the use of "Councillor" to refer to the members.

When the Local Government Act 1993 came into effect from 1 July 1993, the title of the council changed from the Municipality of Pittwater to simply Pittwater Council.

=== Amalgamation ===
A 2015 review of local government boundaries by the NSW Government Independent Pricing and Regulatory Tribunal recommended that the Pittwater Council merge with adjoining councils. The government considered two proposals. The first proposed a merger of Pittwater Council and parts of Warringah Council to form a new council with an area of 214 square kilometres (83 sq mi) and support a population of approximately 141,000. The alternative, proposed by Warringah Council on 23 February 2016, was for an amalgamation of the Pittwater, Manly and Warringah councils.

On 12 May 2016, the council was amalgamated with Manly and Warringah Councils to form the Northern Beaches Council.

== Council ==
=== Mayors/Deputy Mayors ===
Order	Mayor	Term begin	Term end	Deputy Mayors	Year
1	Eric Green	1 May 1992	3 November 1992	Allan Porter	1992
2	Robert Dunn	3 November 1992	27 September 1993	Allan Porter	1992–1993
2	Robert Dunn	3 November 1992	27 September 1993	Ron Starr	1993–1994
3	Ron Starr	21 September 1994	September 1997	John Winter	1994–1995
3	Ron Starr	21 September 1994	September 1997	Bob Grace	1995–1996
3	Ron Starr	21 September 1994	September 1997	Shirley Phelps	1996–1997
4	Patricia Giles	September 1997	September 2004	Bob Dunbar	1997–1998
4	Patricia Giles	September 1997	September 2004	Julie Hegarty	1998–1999
4	Patricia Giles	September 1997	September 2004	Lynne Czinner	1999–2002
4	Patricia Giles	September 1997	September 2004	David James	2002–2004
5	Lynne Czinner	September 2004	12 September 2005	David James	2004–2005
6	Alex McTaggart	12 September 2005	September 2007	Patricia Giles	2005–2009
7	David James	September 2007	September 2009	Patricia Giles	2005–2009
8	Harvey Rose	September 2009	September 2012	Jacqueline Townsend	2009–2011
8	Harvey Rose	September 2009	September 2012	Ian White	2011–2012
9	Jacqueline Townsend	September 2012	12 May 2016	Bob Grace	2012–2013
9	Jacqueline Townsend	September 2012	12 May 2016	Kylie Ferguson	2013–2016

=== Final composition and election method ===
Pittwater Council was composed of nine councillors elected proportionally as three separate wards, each electing three councillors. All councillors were elected for a fixed four-year term of office. The mayor and deputy mayor were elected annually by the councillors at the first meeting of the council. The last election was held on 8 September 2012, and the makeup of the council was as follows when it was dissolved:

Ward	Councillor	Party	Notes
Central Ward	Sue Young	Independent	Elected 2012–2016.
Central Ward	Ian White	Independent	Elected 2008–2016. Elected to Northern Beaches Pittwater Ward, 2017.
Central Ward	Kylie Ferguson	Independent	Elected 2012–2016. Deputy Mayor 2013–2016. Elected to Northern Beaches Pittwater Ward, 2017.
North Ward	Bob Grace	Independent	Elected 1995–2016. Deputy Mayor 1995–1996, 2012–2013. Warringah A Riding Councillor, 1983–1985.
North Ward	Alex McTaggart	Independent	Elected 1999–2008, 2012–2016. Mayor 2005–2007. Elected to Northern Beaches Pittwater Ward, 2017.
North Ward	Selena Griffith	Greens	Elected 2012–2016.
South Ward	Jacqueline Townsend	Independent	Elected 2008–2016. Mayor 2012–2016
South Ward	Julie Hegarty	Independent	Elected 1995–2016. Deputy Mayor 1998–1999
South Ward	Kay Millar	Independent	Elected 2012–2016.

=== General managers ===
Name	Term	Notes
Brian Hrnjak	1 May 1992 – 1997	
Angus Gordon	1997 – September 2005	
Mark Ferguson	September 2005 – 12 May 2016	General Manager of Northern Beaches Council, 2017.

== Demographics ==
At the 2011 Census, there were 57,155 people in the Pittwater local government area, of these 48.8% were male and 51.2% were female. Aboriginal and Torres Strait Islander people made up 0.4% of the population. The median age of people in the Pittwater Council area was 42 years; notably above the national median of 37 years. Children aged 0 – 14 years made up 20.0% of the population and people aged 65 years and over made up 17.0% of the population. Of people in the area aged 15 years and over, 56.1% were married and 11.0% were either divorced or separated.

Population growth in the Pittwater Council area between the 2001 Census and the 2006 Census was 3.40% and in the subsequent five years to the 2011 Census, population growth was 5.54%. When compared with total population growth of Australia for the same periods, being 5.78% and 8.32% respectively, population growth in the Pittwater local government area was lower than the national average. The median weekly income for residents within the Pittwater Council area was higher than the national average.

At the 2011 Census, the proportion of residents in the Pittwater local government area who stated their ancestry as Australian or Anglo-Saxon exceeded 75% of all residents (national average was 65.2%). In excess of 57% of all residents in the Pittwater Council area nominated a religious affiliation with Christianity at the 2011 Census, which was slightly higher than the national average of 50.2%. Meanwhile, as at the Census date, compared to the national average, households in the Pittwater local government area had a significantly lower than average proportion (10.8%) where two or more languages are spoken (national average was 20.4%); and a significantly higher proportion (88.7%) where English only was spoken at home (national average was 76.8%).

Selected historical census data for Pittwater local government area
Census year		2001	2006	2011
Population	Estimated residents on Census night	52,376	54,157	57,155
Population	LGA rank in terms of size within New South Wales			
Population	% of New South Wales population			0.83%
Population	% of Australian population	0.28%	▼0.27%	0.27%
Cultural and language diversity				
Ancestry, top responses	Australian			26.7%
Ancestry, top responses	English			32.0%
Ancestry, top responses	Irish			8.7%
Ancestry, top responses	Scottish			7.8%
Ancestry, top responses	German			3.0%
Language, top responses (other than English)	German	0.8%	▲0.9%	▲1.0%
Language, top responses (other than English)	Italian	0.8%	▼0.7%	0.7%
Language, top responses (other than English)	Serbian	0.6%	0.6%	▼0.5%
Language, top responses (other than English)	Spanish	n/c	▲0.8%	▼0.5%
Language, top responses (other than English)	Croatian	0.5%	0.5%	0.5%
Religious affiliation				
Religious affiliation, top responses	Catholic	22.4%	▲23.2%	▲23.9%
Religious affiliation, top responses	Anglican	29.5%	▼27.3%	▼26.1%
Religious affiliation, top responses	No religion	17.5%	▲20.8%	▲25.3%
Religious affiliation, top responses	Uniting Church	5.1%	▼4.7%	▼4.2%
Religious affiliation, top responses	Presbyterian and Reformed	3.6%	▼3.1%	▼2.8%
Median weekly incomes				
Personal income	Median weekly personal income		A$653	A$754
Personal income	% of Australian median income		140.1%	130.7%
Family income	Median weekly family income		A$1,486	A$2,137
Family income	% of Australian median income		144.7%	144.3%
Household income	Median weekly household income		A$1,767	A$1,819
Household income	% of Australian median income		150.9%	147.4%

== Council seal ==
The seal of Pittwater Council was the result of a design competition held by the council that was won by retired Newport commercial artist Hugh Seelenmeyer [27]. It was first used in the Manly Daily on 29 June 1991 and featured a mangrove tree surrounded by water, representing the close relationship of the area with water and bushland.

== Sister cities ==
Pittwater Council's suburb Mona Vale is sister city to the United States village of Wilmette, Illinois and they participate in an annual student exchange program between their high schools. Pittwater and Wilmette are both home to a Bahá'í House of Worship.
