= Barrenjoey Road =

Road in Sydney, New South Wales, Australia

Barrenjoey Road New South Wales
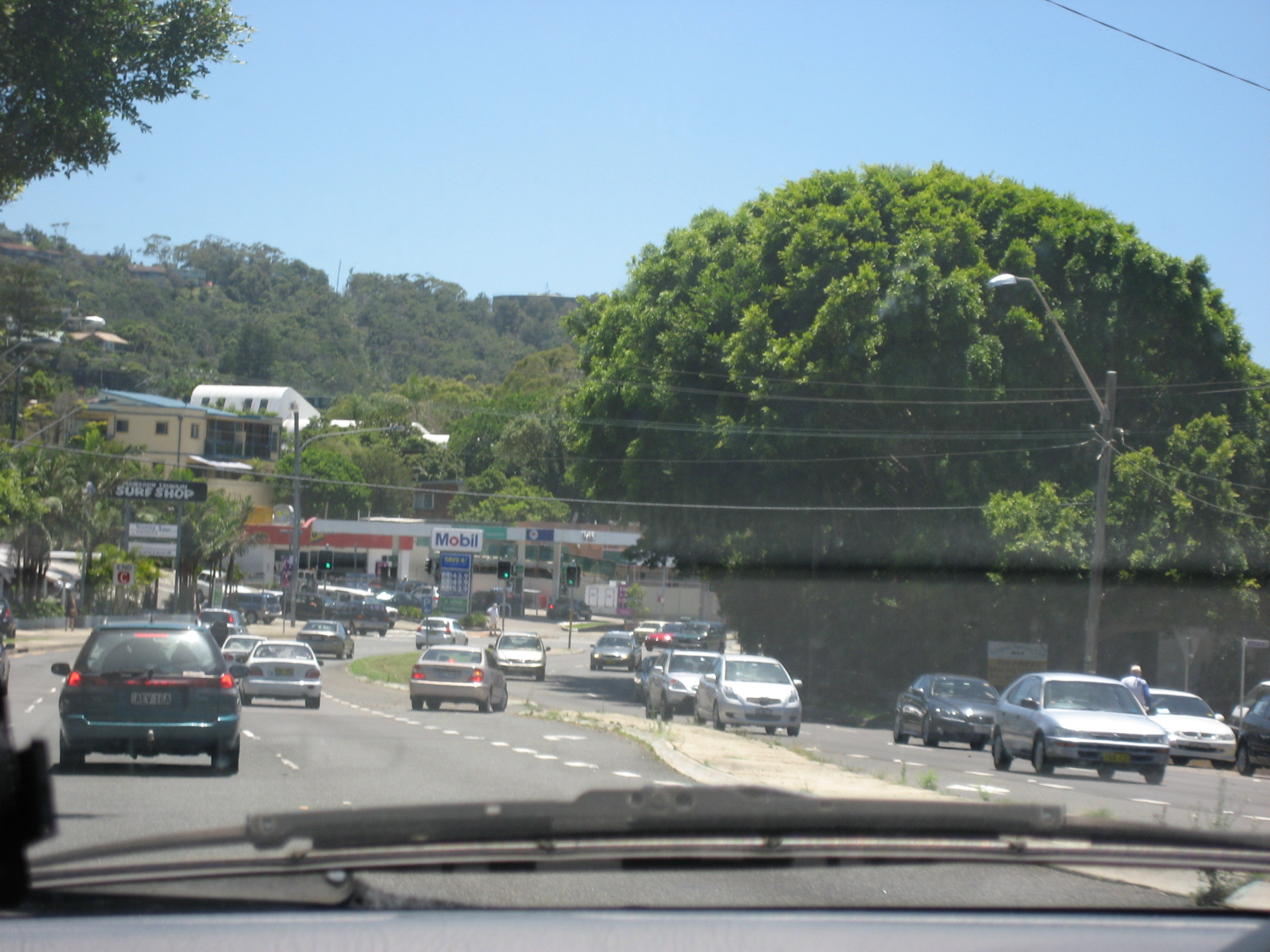
- Barrenjoey Road in Newport
- Location in metropolitan Sydney
- Coordinates: 33.592397°S 151.321434°E (North end); 33.677757°S 151.304001°E (South end)

General information
- Type: Road
- Length: 12.8 km (8.0 mi)
- Gazetted: August 1928
- Former route number: State Route 14 (1974–1998)

Major junctions
- North end: Beach Road; Palm Beach, Sydney
- Whale Beach Road
- South end: Pittwater Road; Mona Vale, Sydney

Location(s)
- Major suburbs: Avalon Beach, Bilgola Beach, Newport

Barrenjoey Road is a main urban road along the northern coast of the Northern Beaches suburbs of Sydney, New South Wales, Australia. In 1978, the Barrenjoey Road area came to national attention due to the unsolved disappearance of Trudie Adams.

== Route ==
Barrenjoey Road commences at the intersection with Beach Road in Palm Beach and heads in a southerly direction as a two-lane, single-carriageway road, through Bilgola Beach and Avalon Beach before it reaches Newport, where it widens to a four-lane, dual-carriageway road, and then to six lanes immediately afterwards, to eventually terminate at the intersection with Pittwater Road in Mona Vale.

== History ==
The passing of the Main Roads Act of 1924 through the Parliament of New South Wales provided for the declaration of Main Roads, roads partially funded by the State government through the Main Roads Board (later Transport for NSW). Main Road No. 164 was declared along this road on 8 August 1928, from Newport to Mona Vale (and continuing south via Narrabeen, Dee Why, Balgowlah, along Military Road and Falcon Street through Mosman, then along Miller Street to the intersection with Great Northern Highway (today Pacific Highway) and Mount Street in North Sydney); with the passing of the Main Roads (Amendment) Act of 1929 to provide for additional declarations of State Highways and Trunk Roads, this was amended to Main Road 164 on 8 April 1929.

Main Road 164 was extended north to Avalon Beach on 21 February 1933, and then again to Palm Beach on 17 July 1934,; it was officially named Barrenjoey Road, between Ocean Road in Palm Beach and Pittwater Road in Mona Vale, on 10 January 1951.

The passing of the Roads Act of 1993 updated road classifications and the way they could be declared within New South Wales. Under this act, Barrenjoey Road retains its declaration as part of Main Road 164.

Barrenjoey Road was signed State Route 14 in 1974, but was decommissioned in 1998.

=== Disappearance of Trudie Adams ===
Trudie Adams disappeared in the early hours of 25 June 1978 after attending a dance at the Newport Surf Life Saving Club. She hitchhiked home, entering a vehicle on Barrenjoey Road, and has not been seen since. Her disappearance is significant in that it sparked New South Wales' biggest missing person search at the time, sparked extensive and ongoing national media attention, and eventually a A$250,000 reward.

== Major intersections ==
Barrenjoey Road is entirely contained within the Northern Beaches Council local government area.

Location	km	mi	Destinations	Notes
Palm Beach	0.0	0.0	Beach Road – Palm Beach, Barrenjoey Headland	Northern terminus of road
Avalon Beach	4.5	2.8	Whale Beach Road – Whale Beach	
Avalon Beach	5.6	3.5	Central Road – Clareville	
Avalon Beach–Bilgola Beach boundary	7.0	4.3	Plateau Road – Bilgola Plateau	
Mona Vale	12.8	8.0	Pittwater Road – Church Point, Narrabeen, Dee Why, Mosman	Southern terminus of road
Route transition
