= Bilgola Plateau =

- Suburb
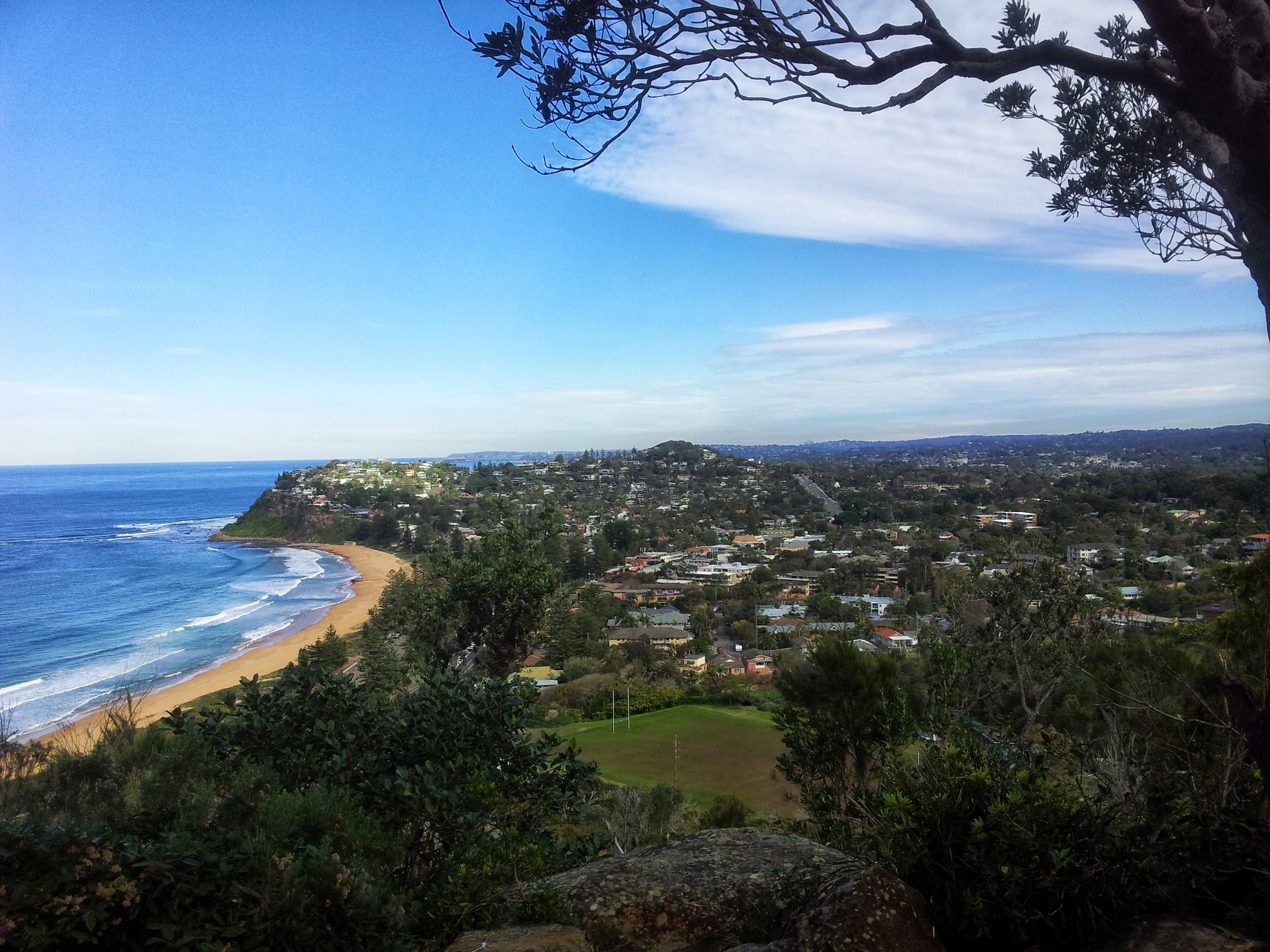
- View from Bilgola Plateau

- Interactive map of Bilgola Plateau
- Country: Australia
- State: New South Wales
- City: Sydney
- LGA: Northern Beaches Council
- Location: 34 km (21 mi) NE of Sydney CBD

Government
  - State electorate: Pittwater
  - Federal division: Mackellar
- Elevation: 150 m (490 ft)

Population
  - Total: 3,650 (2021 census)
- Postcode: 2107
Suburbs around Bilgola Plateau
Clareville	Avalon Beach	Avalon Beach
Clareville	Bilgola Plateau	Bilgola Beach
Newport	Newport	Newport

Bilgola Plateau is a suburb in Sydney's Northern Beaches in the state of New South Wales, Australia.

The suburb is mainly residential, with two small rows of shops, a small park and a primary school located on the top of the plateau. Bilgola Beach on the eastern side features a surf club and kiosk. Rising to an elevation of 150m above sea level, the suburb has views of the beach and the ocean on the eastern side, and views of the body of water, Pittwater on the western side. To the north are the suburbs of Avalon Beach, Whale Beach, and Palm Beach, with Careel Bay being a minor bay in between the latter two, as well as Clareville to the North West. To the south are Newport, Mona Vale and Narrabeen.

The plateau was previously named Mount Loftus, after governor of NSW Lord Augustus Loftus. Given its modest elevation, designating it as a plateau is more appropriate, and is now named for the Aboriginal derived name of Bilgola (derived from the local aboriginal language meaning "swirling water"), likely describing Bilgola Beach to the east.

== Demographics ==
According to the 2021 census, 3,650 people live in Bilgola Plateau. The majority (70.8%) were born in Australia, with those born in England (11.2%), New Zealand (1.9%), South Africa (1.8%), the USA (1.4%) and Germany (1.2%) making up a large portion of the remaining residents. Given this, a large majority (91.5%) of households speak only English. The median age is 46 years old.

The population of Aboriginal and Torres Strait Islander individuals is low, at 0.3% of the total residents.
