= Peter Green (physician) =

Peter Green FRACP, FACG
- Born: 30 January 1947 (age 79); Sydney
- Education: Newington College; University of Sydney
- Occupation: Gastroenterologist

Peter Henry Rae Green (born 30 January 1947) is an Australian-born gastroenterologist and Professor of Clinical Medicine and Director of the Celiac Disease Center at Columbia University, New York City. He is notable for his expertise in celiac disease and his research includes epidemiology, clinical manifestations, associated diseases and the pathophysiological mechanisms of the syndrome. Green has an active research collaboration with the Karolinska Institute in Sweden.

== Early life ==
Green was born in Sydney and attended Newington College (1959–1964) commencing in the preparatory school at Killara. At the University of Sydney he graduated as a Bachelor of Medicine and Surgery with First Class Honours in 1971. During his medical studies, Green played with the Newington Old Boys Rugby Club as a member of a Kentwell Cup winning team and was a surf lifesaver with Palm Beach Surf Life Saving Club. He is still a member of the Cabbage Tree Club at Palm Beach, New South Wales.

== Medical career ==
Green became the senior medical registrar at Royal North Shore Hospital and trained there in gastroenterology before becoming clinical superintendent in 1976. Later that year he was appointed to the Beth Israel Medical Center and Harvard Medical School in Boston, Massachusetts. He is now an Attending Physician at the New York Presbyterian Hospital and Columbia University Medical Center. In 1978, Green became a Fellow of the Royal Australasian College of Physicians and in 1979 he was awarded an MD from Sydney University based on research performed at Harvard and Columbia Universities.

== Publications ==
He is the author of a book titled "Celiac disease, a hidden epidemic", first published by HarperCollins in 2006 and currently in its second edition and has over 300 publications in medical journals that include original research, invited reviews, editorials and book chapters.

== Awards ==
- American Gastroenterological Association (AGA), Foundation Mentors Research Scholar Award in 2007, for his teaching of medical students, residents, and fellows
- American Society for Gastrointestinal Endoscopy (ASGE), Master Endoscopist Award in 2007, for his expertise in the field of gastroenterology
