= Charles Challice =

Australian pilot, accountant and stock broker

- Born: Alan Bernard Chalice; 17 August 1914; Sydney
- Died: 29 January 1975 (aged 60); Sydney
- Education: Newington College
- Occupations: Accountant; Pilot; Stock broker
- Spouse: Dr Jean Mason-Johnson OAM

Alan Bernard Chalice (17 August 1914 – 29 January 1975) was an Australian accountant and stock broker who flew with the RAF and RAAF during World War II. His preferred Christian name was Charles so was referred to throughout his life in print as A.B. Challice or Charles Challice.

== Early life ==
Challice was born in Sydney to Hildred Mary (née Turnham) and Percy Ewart Challice of Bright Street, Marrickville. His parents were members of the Baptist Church and his father and paternal grandfather were employed in the building and carpentry trades. From 1927 until 1932 he attended the senior school at Newington College. His Valete in The Newingtonian, the school journal, records him as being a member of Manton House and sitting the Leaving Certificate in 1932. He passed the subjects of Maths i, Maths ii, History and Economics. He rowed for the first time in the Senior VIII at the GPS Head of the River for Newington in his final year at school.

== Working life ==
After leaving Newington Challice took up accounting eventually becoming a member of the Australian Institute of Chartered Accountants. From 1932 to 1936 he was articled to the accounting firm of J.H. Trist and Stranger and from 1936 to 1939 he was an accountant with Nestlé Ltd.

== War service ==
In 1939 Challice enlisted in the A.I.F. and in the same year he transferred to the Royal Australian Air Force. He went to Rhodesia for pilot training and in 1940 he was posted to the 22nd RAF squadron in the United Kingdom. There he piloted Beaufort Torpedo Bombers on flights over the North Sea. Later he served in the Middle East, Malta, and Ceylon. At the war's end he returned to Australia with the rank of flight lieutenant.

== Later life ==
After World War II Challice started to drift away from the accounting profession. In 1945 through his connections with Nestlés he went to Melbourne to become a member of the Australian Government's Tin Plate Board which allocated that resource. On 20 March 1946 Challice married Jean Mason-Johnson, a medical graduate of the University of Sydney. Challice came to prefer administrative work. From 1946 to 1947 he was chief accountant for South East Asia with the United Nations Relief and Rehabilitation Administration (UNRRA) and was stationed in Shanghai for six months. He was also chief transportation officer of UNRRA for China. In 1947 he returned to Australia as a pilot for Cathay Pacific. In the same year he again worked for Nestlés. In 1949 he became the general secretary of the NSW Division of the Australian Red Cross. In 1951 the Red Cross bought the historic Sydney building Petty's Hotel and they turned it into the Blood Bank under Challice's direction. He held the position of general secretary for over ten years. In 1953 the Australian Government sent him to Vietnam to provide assistance to Northern Vietnamese refugees who were fleeing south to escape communism. In 1958 Challice became the fifth chief executive of the Sydney Stock Exchange, with the title of Secretary. In this position he presided over a number of important administrative changes initiated by the then chairman, A.H. Urquhart. Among the most important of these reforms was the replacement of the call system of trading by the post system. In 1960 he resigned from his administrative position at the Stock Exchange to become a member. From the date of his election he was a partner in the firm of Ernest L. Davis & Co. As a broker Challice specialised in semi-government underwriting. He was on the Sydney Stock Exchange Committee from 1962 to 1968 and he chaired the Exchange's education sub-committee from 1964 to 1968. He was a founding fellow of the Securities Institute of Australia. In December 1970 he retired from business and resigned from the Exchange.

== Sporting and club life ==
Challice was always interested in sport having played Rugby Union and rowed as a schoolboy. For many years his family had a beach house in the fashionable Sydney beachside suburb of Palm Beach. He was an ardent fisherman, a passion which he shared with his Ernest L. Davis & Co, partner and war time service friend R.A. Brash. In 1933 he joined the Palm Beach Surf Life Saving Club and continued to be associated with the club as an active reserve member until his early death. In 1956 he was appointed to the Stewards' Appeal Court by The Royal Automobile Club of Great Britain in Australia. The members of the court were leading citizens of Melbourne and Sydney who have no connection with motor sport clubs or the controlling body the Confederation of Australian Motor Sports. The decisions of the court were final in all matters concerning motor sport in Australia. Challice was a member of the Union Club, Australian Jockey Club, Royal Sydney Yacht Squadron, Imperial Service Club and the Cabbage Tree Club where he was chairman in 1961 and 1962.

== Death ==
On 29 January 1975, Challice died in Sydney. He was cremated at the Northern Suburbs Crematorium. On Australia Day 2006, Jean Mason-Johnson was awarded the Medal of the Order of Australia for service to medicine, particularly in the field of dermatology, and to the community. Jean Challice died on 1 September 2008. Her ashes were interred alongside Challice at North Ryde.
