= Disappearance of Trudie Adams =

1978 missing person case in Australia

Trudie Adams
- Born: Trudie Jeanette Adams; 19 September 1959
- Disappeared: 25 June 1978 (aged 18); Newport, New South Wales, Australia
- Status: Missing for 48 years, 4 months and 28 days

Locations
1 Barrenjoey Road - Trudie entered vehicle

Trudie Jeanette Adams is an Australian missing person who was last seen in the early hours of 25 June 1978 after attending a dance at the Newport Surf Life Saving Club in New South Wales, Australia. She was 18 years old. She left the event early before hitchhiking home, at which point she entered a vehicle on Barrenjoey Road and has not been seen since. Her disappearance sparked New South Wales' biggest missing person search at the time, attracted extensive and ongoing national media attention, and eventually a $250,000 reward.

== Disappearance and investigation ==
Trudie Adams' parents and ex-boyfriend, Steven Norris, reported her missing on 25 June 1978 after she failed to arrive home from the dance. Although police initially believed that the car she entered was a green Kombi van, Norris, as the main eyewitness, stated that he saw her enter a light-coloured 1977 Holden panel van. Police who investigated the case originally cast suspicion on Norris. Eventually he was cleared, and suspicion widened to those involved in the drug scene.

In the days after the attacks, a number of female rape victims, who had been assaulted by two disguised men, began to report a series of then-unknown crimes to police. Investigators then suspected that Adams' disappearance was linked to the 14 now-known violent rapes that had occurred in the Northern Beaches between 1971 and 1978, and may also be related to an attempted attack on a hitchhiker earlier on the evening of Adams' disappearance. On 16 August 1978, a reward of $20,000 was offered by the New South Wales government, and over the years her suspected murder has been investigated by police four times.

== Developments ==
- In 1992, the case was reopened based on a refocused interest in the possible involvement of the green Kombi van.
- In 2008, the reward was raised to $250,000 for information which would lead to the conviction of her murderer(s).
- In 2009, the case's prime suspect, a convicted drug dealer and sex offender known as Neville Brian Tween, who was identified by some of the rape victims, was finally interviewed by police regarding Adams' disappearance. Tween, who had also been a police informant, denied any involvement in the disappearance or the rape cases (despite circumstantial evidence) and died in 2013.
- In 2011, an inquest was held in order to further investigate the disappearance of Adams, which resulted in the Coroner declaring that Adams died of "homicide or misadventure."
- In 2018, interest in the case was reignited by the airing of the second series of the Australian crime podcast Unravel and TV documentary Barrenjoey Road. A number of non-reported crimes and previously unknown victims have also come forward due to the airing of the podcast.

== See also ==
- List of people who disappeared mysteriously: post-1970
- Highway One (film)
