= Taylors Point =

Coordinates: 33°38′13″S 151°18′20″E

Taylors Point Sydney, New South Wales
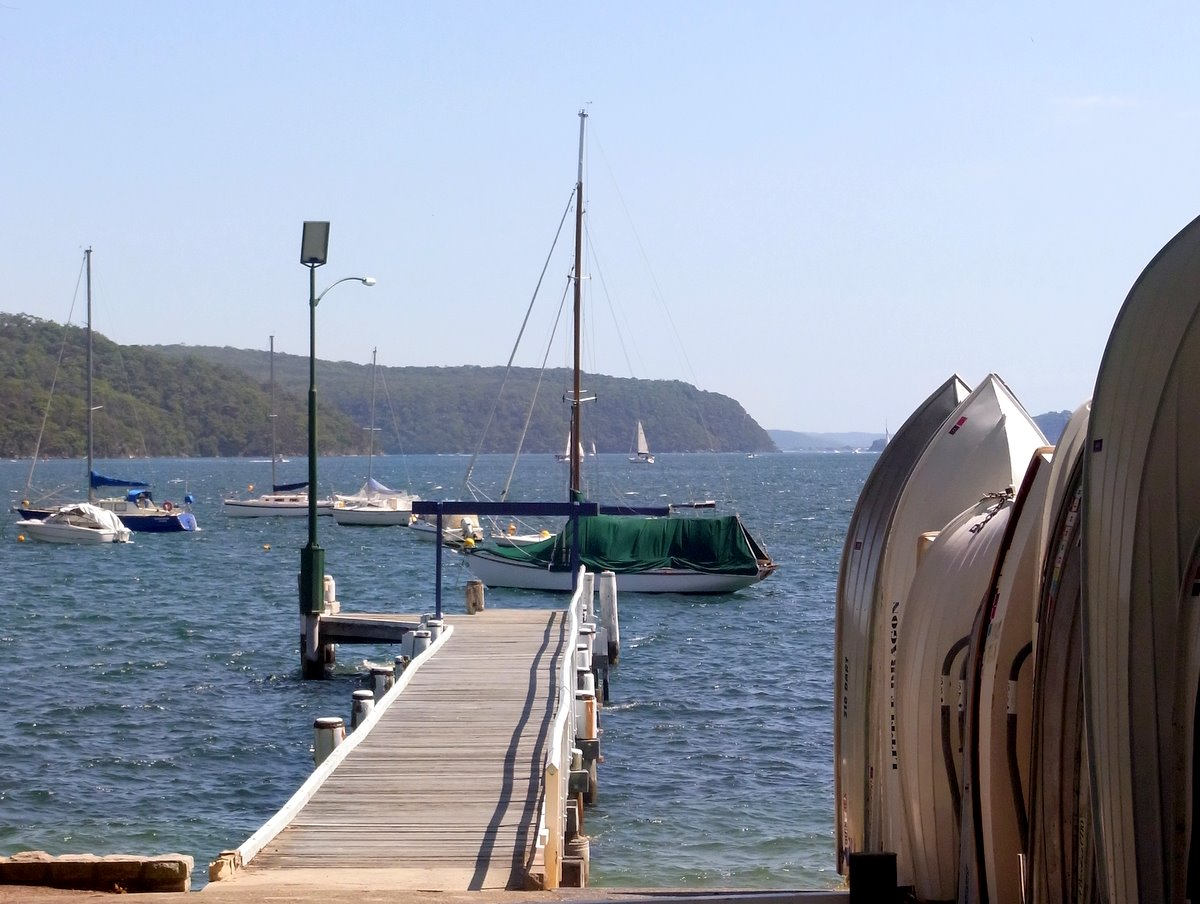
- Postcode(s): 2107
- Location: 34.9 km (22 mi) north of Sydney CBD
- LGA(s): Northern Beaches Council
- State electorate(s): Pittwater
- Federal division(s): Mackellar
Localities around Taylors Point:
Pittwater	Pittwater	Clareville
Pittwater, Scotland Island	Taylors Point	Avalon
Pittwater	Bilgola	Bilgola

Taylors Point is a locality and point in Clareville, a suburb of Sydney, Australia, situated on the Northern Beaches. It was named after John Taylor, who was an early owner of property on Taylors Point.
