= Nyree Osieck =

- Born: 30 December 1976 (age 49) Sydney
- Height: 169 cm (5 ft 7 in)
- Weight: 67 kg (148 lb)
- School: Barrenjoey High School

Rugby union career
- Position(s): Wing, Fullback
Senior career
Years	Team	Apps	(Points)
1999–2002	Waratahs		(0)
2004–2007	Auckland Storm		(0)
International career
Years	Team	Apps	(Points)
2001–2002	Australia	6	(15)

Nyree Osieck (born 30 December 1976) is a former Australian rugby union player. She made her test debut for Australia against the touring English side in 2001 at Sydney. She was selected for the Wallaroos 2002 Rugby World Cup squad to compete in Spain.

In 2000, Osieck played for the Lady Waratahs team against the Auckland Storm in a Super 12 curtain raiser at Eden Park.
