= Manly Daily =

Newspaper serving Manly, Sydney, Australia

- Type: Community newspaper
- Format: Tabloid
- Owner(s): News Corp Australia
- Editor: Edward Lincoln
- Founded: 28 July 1906
- Language: English
- Website: Official website

The Manly Daily is an Australian community newspaper, covering the Northern Beaches region of Sydney.

The paper is one of News Corp Australia's community newspapers in New South Wales. It was delivered free to homes and businesses on Wednesdays and Saturdays until April 2020. It had previously been printed five days a week. From May 2020 it became digital only.

== History ==
The paper was established on 28 July 1906 by Edward Lincoln with a two-page issue.

Only once in its history has the Manly Daily failed to appear: on 24 February 1966, when excessive humidity in the switchboard caused a breakdown in the electrical system. A double edition was published the following day.

The newspaper was last printed at Manly on 4 August 1989 (the edition of 5 August). The paper was then printed at the Parramatta plant of its parent company, Cumberland Newspapers, now NewsLocal, a News Ltd subsidiary until 1 October 2004. It was printed at Rural Press, North Richmond, until an upgrade of the News Limited-owned Chullora Print Centre was completed in 2008.

On 28 July 2006, the newspaper celebrated its 100th anniversary with a special edition that featured the founding of the newspaper along with events and stories that have made an impact on the peninsula, such as the 2000 Summer Olympics torch relay.

In December 2017, it was announced the newspaper would cease publishing five days a week and instead focus on Wednesday and Saturday editions from January 2018. More content would become online-only, with the use of a paywall.

In April 2020, Newscorp announced the Manly Daily would suspend print publication as one of many newspapers affected by the coronavirus pandemic in Australia.

== Readership ==
The newspaper was distributed to about 90,000 homes and businesses with an estimated readership of about 156,000. It was distributed all over the Northern Beaches from the Spit Bridge and Seaforth to Palm Beach and the Hawkesbury River, as well as being available online.

== See also ==
- List of newspapers in Australia
