= The Basin, New South Wales =

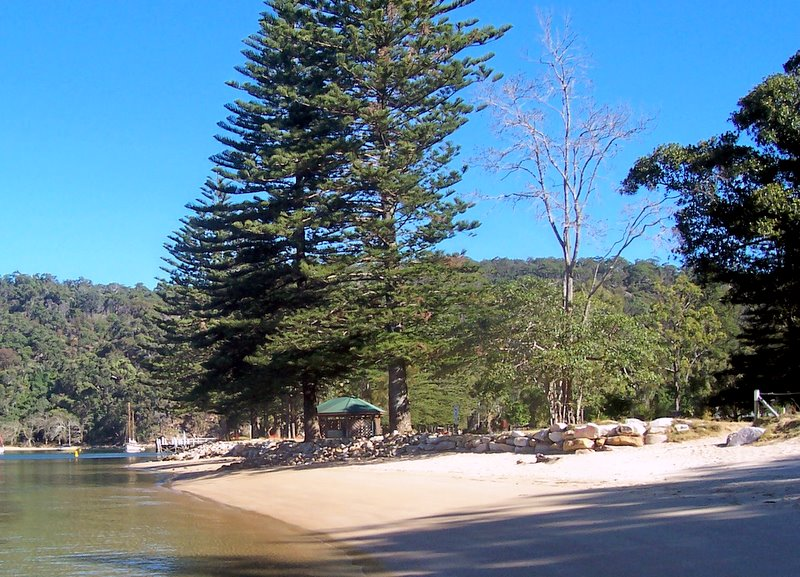
The Basin, beach and wharf at Ku-ring-gai Chase National Park, Australia

The Basin is a locality in northern Sydney, in the Australian state of New South Wales. The Basin is located 42 kilometres north of the Sydney central business district, in the local government area of Pittwater Council.

The Basin is located in Ku-ring-gai Chase National Park, on the western shores of Pittwater, beside Coasters Retreat. Palm Beach is located nearby.

The Basin is the setting for Ursula Dubosarsky's prizewinning novel The Red Shoe, inspired by the 1954 Petrov Affair.
