= Sydney Stock Exchange =

Stock exchange in Sydney, Australia

- Type: Stock exchange
- Location: Sydney, New South Wales, Australia
- Founded: 1997; 29 years ago
- Owner: AIMS Financial Group
- Currency: Australian dollar
- Website: www.ssx.sydney

The Sydney Stock Exchange (SSX) is a stock exchange with its headquarters in Sydney, Australia. It is a wholly owned subsidiary of the AIMS Financial Group, with a market license granted by the Australian Securities & Investments Commission (ASIC) on 5 November 2013. Formerly known as the Asia Pacific Exchange (APX), APX listed its first few companies on 6 March 2014.

== History ==
The Asia Pacific Exchange first opened in 1997 as the Australian property exempt market before receiving a stock exchange license in August 2004. In November 2015, the exchange was renamed the Sydney Stock Exchange. To promote Sydney and Australia as a leading financial centre, and allow the listees to be identified as being listed on a major city's exchange, the exchange became known as the Sydney Stock Exchange (SSX). The exchange is an observer member of the Federation of Euro-Asian Stock Exchanges.

== Logo ==
The SSX's corporate logo consists of a black background with multiple off-centre red circles.

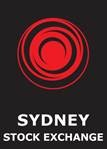
The logo of the Sydney Stock Exchange

== See also ==
- Charles Challice, the fifth chief executive of the Sydney Stock Exchange
- List of stock exchanges in the Commonwealth of Nations
