= Palm Beach Surf Life Saving Club =

Palm Beach
- Full name: Palm Beach Surf Life Saving Club
- Founded: 1921; 105 years ago
- Members: 500 senior, 250 junior

The Palm Beach Surf Life Saving Club is an Australian Surf Life Saving Club. The Club offers a range of activities and encourages members to continually develop and update their lifesaving skills. It is located at the southern end of Palm Beach, New South Wales, and members provide voluntary patrols on weekends and public holidays. Its members participate in internal and external competitions. Palm Beach Surf Life Saving Club is a voluntary, non-for-profit organisation. It is considered that "if you have on your resume that you're a member of Palm Beach Surf Club, you've really made Sydney's social set."

== History ==
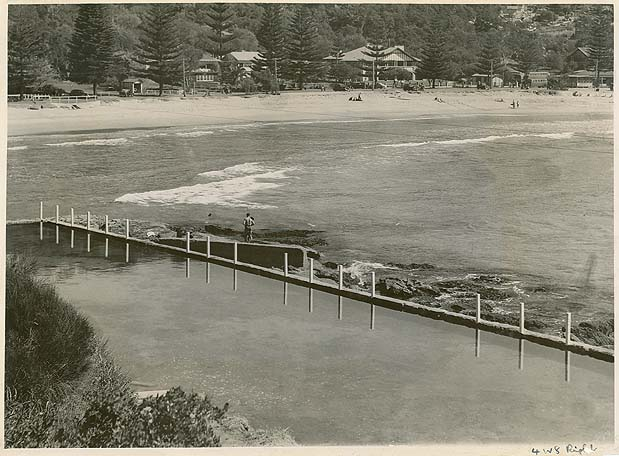
South Palm Beach

Palm Beach Surf Life Saving Club was founded in 1921 to patrol and improve beach safety for the local community and all beach-goers. Its early membership included members of the Bullmore, Curlewis, Raine, Forrester and Hordern families. The club was established with just a £93 three-seater double-ender surf boat and a six-square-metre wooden shed. Its current heritage-listed clubhouse, Powhokohat, was purchased in 1954 for £16,000 and was one of the first reinforced concrete private residences in Australia when it was built. The purchase is the first since In 1955, the club bought an adjoining Florida Road vacant block for £1,575 and now owns nine blocks of land totalling one hectare on Ocean Road. In 2009, it spent $3,325,000 on a neighbouring residential property.

== Notable members ==
- Charles Challice
- Adrian Curlewis
- Peter Green
- Gordon Grimsley King
- John Mant
- Henry Austin Wilshire

== Affiliated clubs ==
After seven years full membership of Palm Beach SLSC members are eligible to join the adjacent men’s only social club known as the Cabbage Tree Club or the women's club known as the Pacific Club.

== See also ==
- Surf lifesaving
- Surf Life Saving Australia
- List of Australian surf lifesaving clubs
- Surfing
