= Salt Pan Cove =

Salt Pan Cove is located on the eastern foreshores of Pittwater in Newport, New South Wales, Australia. The area can be accessed via Prince Alfred Parade leading south down to the creek and cove via log timber steps. South Beach can be accessed from the public access stairs on Hudson Parade opposite Hansford Parade, and then following the coastline south.

== Geography ==
The parent geology is made up of the shales and sandstones of the Newport Formation of the Narrabeen Group. The derived soils are the moderately deep brown, red and gleyed colluvial podzols of the Watagan soil landscape.

== Flora and fauna ==
A few habitat trees such as Spotted Gum, Cabbage-tree Palm, Swamp Oak, Forest Oak and Blueberry Ash remain. Squirrel gliders, a threatened species in NSW and an endangered population in Pittwater, have been recorded nearby also.

== Aboriginal sites ==
Several Aboriginal middens are located along the muddy foreshore:

- An open midden located above South Beach consists mainly of oyster shell
- An open midden located to the north of the Reserve, consists of 70% shells. The shell types include oyster, mussel, cockle and mud oyster.
- An open midden severely eroded by wave action, consisting of oyster, mud oyster, mussels and cockle shell types.
- An open midden, similar to the above site, severely eroded by wave action. Oyster, mud oyster, periwinkle and mussel shell types make up 50% of the midden contents.
