= Bilgola Beach =

- Suburb
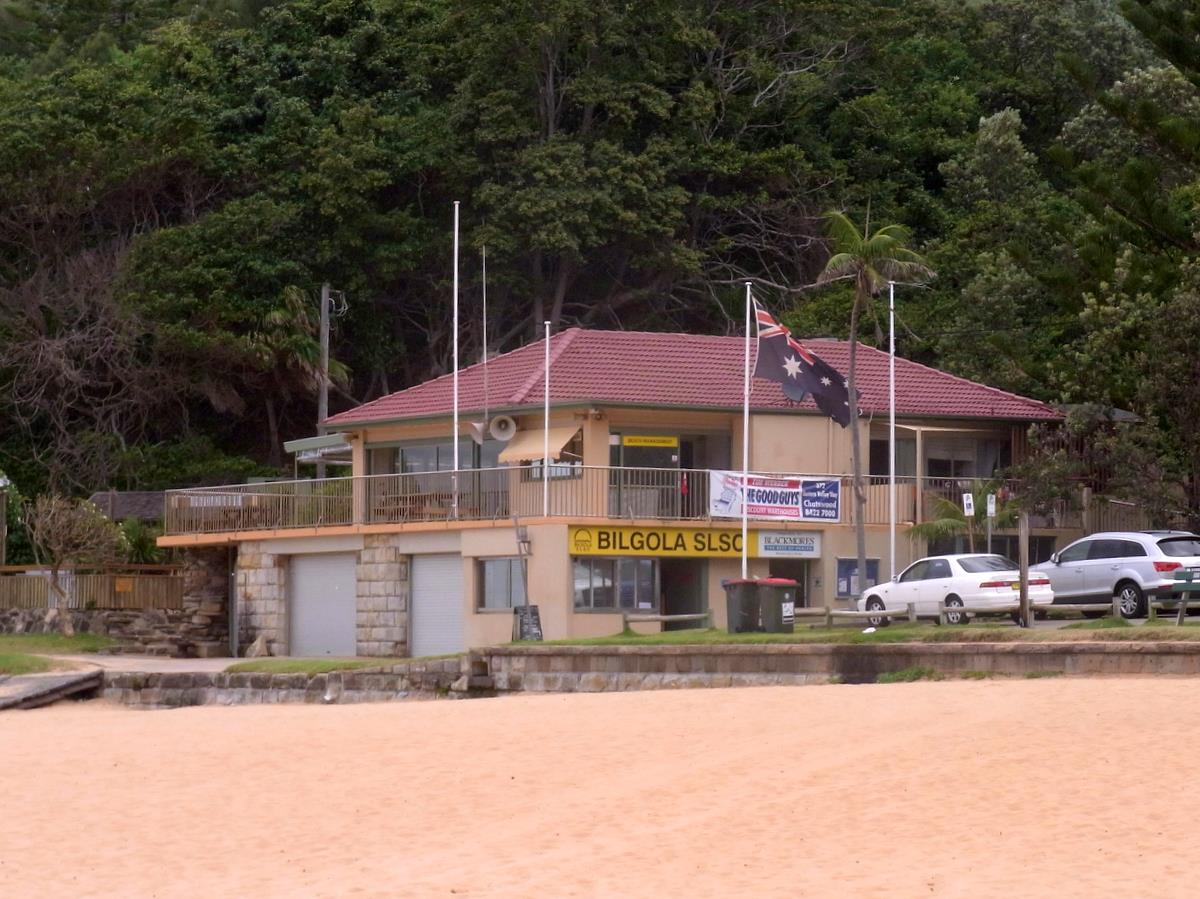
- Bilgola Surf Lifesaving Club

- Interactive map of Bilgola Beach
- Country: Australia
- State: New South Wales
- City: Sydney
- LGA: Northern Beaches Council
- Location: 33 km (21 mi) north-east of Sydney CBD

Government
  - State electorate: Pittwater
  - Federal division: Mackellar
- Elevation: 14 m (46 ft)

Population
  - Total: 251 (SAL 2021)
Suburbs around Bilgola Beach
Avalon Beach	Avalon Beach
Bilgola Plateau	Bilgola Beach	Tasman Sea
Newport	Newport

Bilgola Beach is a suburb in Sydney's Northern Beaches in the state of New South Wales, Australia. Bilgola Beach is 33 kilometres north-east of the Sydney central business district, in the local government area of Northern Beaches Council. It and Bilgola Plateau were gazetted as suburbs in 2012, dividing the previous suburb of Bilgola.

== Location ==
Bilgola Beach is located on the Tasman Sea side of the Barrenjoey Peninsula between Avalon Beach to the north and Newport to the south. The landscape rises steeply behind Bilgola Beach to Bilgola Plateau, descending to Clareville on the western side of the peninsula.

== History ==
The name "Bilgola" is derived from an Aboriginal term Belgoula meaning "swirling waters", or perhaps "a pretty beach with steep slopes, studded with cabbage palms". The word Belgoula was noted in Surveyor James Meehan's records of 1814. Robert Henderson received a grant of 100 acres (0.40 km^{2}) in 1822 which he named "Belgoola". The district eventually adopted the simplified name "Bilgola".

The area was owned by the McLurcan family from the start of the early 1900s. Mrs McLurcan was famous for her cookery book, 'Mrs McLurcan's Cookery Book'. The large family home was surrounded by cabbage tree palms, for which the area is noted.

There were plans during the 1960s to build a bridge bypass of the twisting road ('Bilgola Bends') between the north and south headlands of Bilgola. The bridge was not built but a small amount of landfill was added to remove a sharp bend in the southern end of the road in preparation for construction. The bend still remains, with the landfill now providing a small grassy area, with an excellent view of Newport Beach.

== Demographics ==
According to the 2021 census of Population, there were 251 residents in Bilgola Beach. 69.3% of people were born in Australia. The most common other countries of birth were England 8.8%, New Zealand 3.6%, South Africa 2.4%, Germany 1.6% and Netherlands 1.6%. 89.2% of people only spoke English at home. Other languages spoken at home included French 2.8%, Dutch 1.2% and Arabic 1.2%. The most common responses for religion in Bilgola were No Religion 51.8%, Catholic 17.9% and Anglican 14.3%.

== Transport ==
The main road connecting the northern part of the Barrenjoey Peninsula to the rest of Sydney, Barrenjoey Road, runs through Hewitt Park along the cliff line between Bilgola headland and Bilgola South headland. The road separates Bilgola Plateau from Bilgola Beach.

== Sport and recreation ==
Bilgola Surf Life Saving Club is located at Bilgola Beach. It was formed in the summer of 1949 with construction of the club house beginning in 1950.

Avalon Bilgola Amateur Swimming Club swims at the Bilgola Rock Pool on Saturday mornings during the summer months. The club was formed in 1961.
