= Careel Bay =

Bay and locality in Sydney, Australia

Coordinates: 33°37′24″S 151°19′38″E

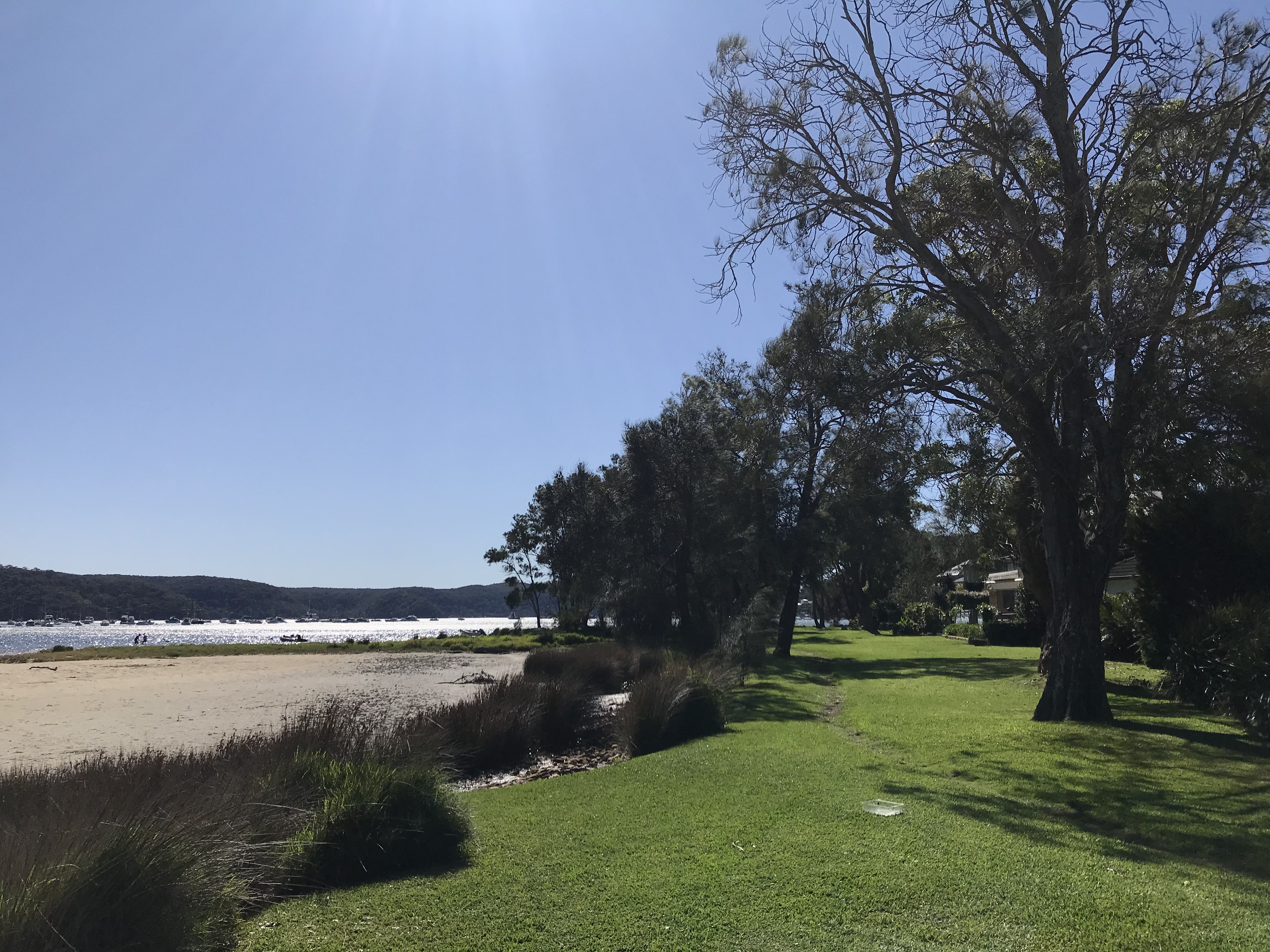
Careel Bay

Careel Bay (formerly 'Evening Bay') is a bay and adjacent locality in Sydney, New South Wales, Australia. The locality is within the suburb of Avalon Beach. The bay lies adjacent to the suburbs of Avalon Beach and Palm Beach in the north east of Pittwater.

== Environment ==
The bay has the largest stand of mangroves and sea grass beds in Pittwater. The Bay is also a fish nursery important to Pittwater and nearby coastal waters.

A total of 116 bird species have been recorded at Careel Bay and its immediate catchment. The endangered Bush Stone-Curlew is a resident of Careel Bay, along with the regionally significant Mangrove Gerygone and international

migratory species such as the Eastern Curlew, Whimbrel and Bar-tailed Godwit. Some of these birds, from East-Asia, use Careel Bay as a stop off area. The Federal Government and Australian people are committed to a number of agreements to protect these birds and their habitat, including the China-Australia Migratory Bird Agreement and the Japan-Australia Migratory Bird Agreement agreements.

Careel Bay is the most significant area of estuarine wetlands in the Northern Beaches. It contains a combination of natural features, rare in the Sydney region, that provide habitat for a variety of marine life and bird species

Nature sign provided by Pittwater Council located in Currawong Avenue Reserve:

=== Searching for an endless summer ===
Migratory shorebirds of Careel Bay

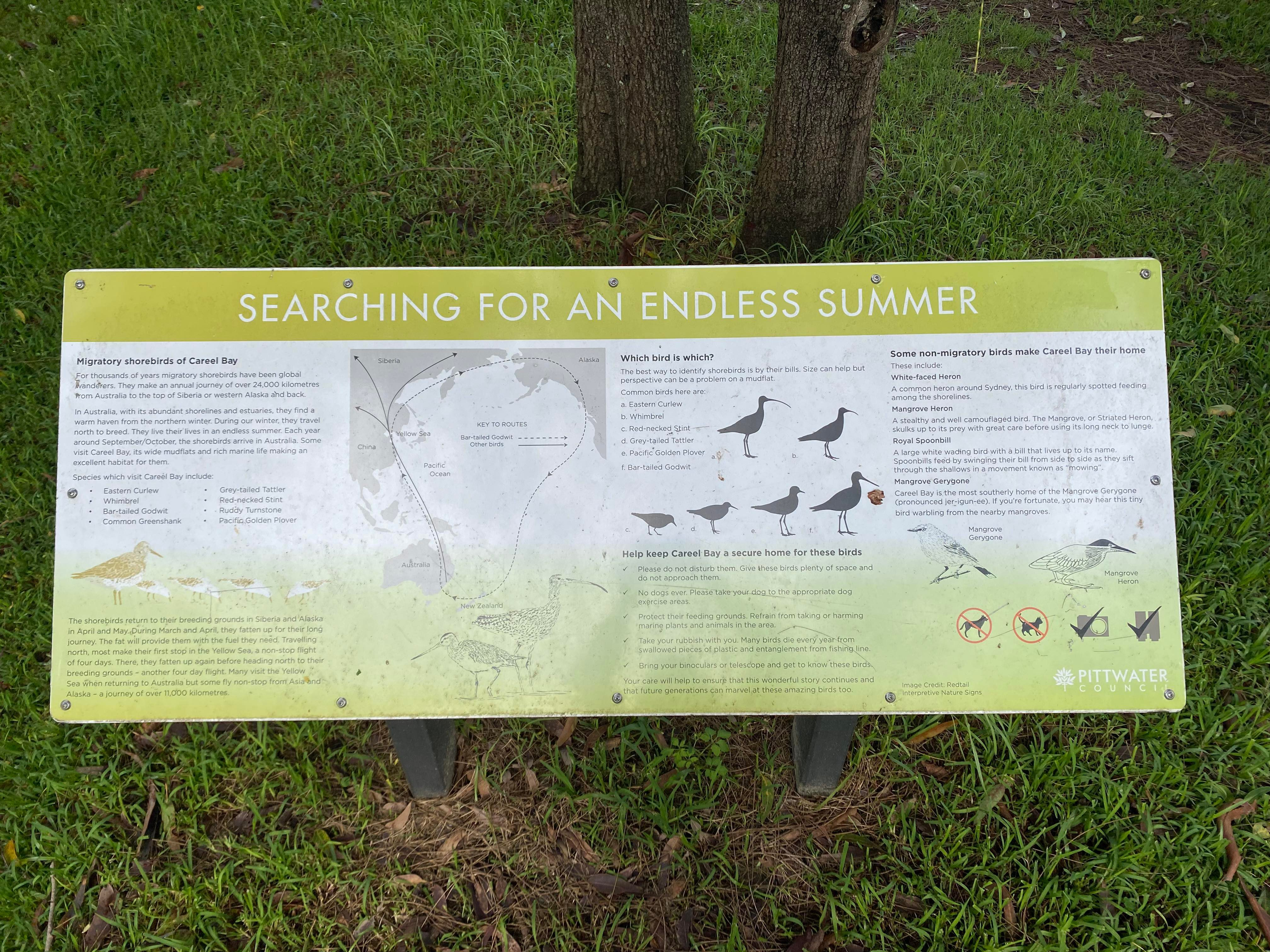
"SEARCHING FOR AN ENDLESS SUMMER" Sign

For thousands of years migratory shorebirds have been global wanderers. They make an annual journey of over 24,000 kilometres from Australia to the top of Siberia or western Alaska and back.

In Australia, with its abundant shorelines and estuaries, they find a warm haven from the northern winter. During our winter, they travel north to breed. They live their lives in an endless summer. Each year around September/October, the shorebirds arrive in Australia. Some visit Careel Bay, its wide mudflats and rich marine life making an excellent habitat for them.

Species which visit Careel Bay include:

- Eastern Curlew
- Whimbrel
- Bar-tailed Godwit
- Common Greenshank
- Grey-tailed Tattler
- Red-necked stint
- Ruddy Turnstone
- Pacific Golden Plover

The shorebirds return to their breeding grounds in Siberia and Alaska in April and May. During March and April, they fatten up for their long journey. The fat will provide them with the fuel they need. Travelling north, most make their first stop in the Yellow Sea, a non-stop flight of four days. There, they fatten up again before heading north to their breeding grounds – another four day flight. Many visit the Yellow Sea when returning to Australia but some fly non-stop from Asia and Alaska – a journey of over 11,000 kilometres.

Which bird is which?

The best way to identify shorebirds is by their bills. Size can help but perspective can be a problem on a mudflat. Common birds here are:

a. Eastern Curlew

b. Whimbrel

c. Red-necked stint

d. Grey-tailed Tattler

e. Pacific Golden Plover

f. Bar-tailed Godwit

Help keep Careel Bay a secure home for these birds

- Please do not disturb them. GIve these birds plenty of space and do not approach them.
- No dogs ever. Please take your dog to the appropriate dog exercise areas
- Protect their feeding grounds. Refrain from taking or harming marine plants and animals in the area
- Take your rubbish with you. Many birds die every year from swallowed pieces of plastic and entanglement from fishing line.
- Bring your binoculars or telescope and get to know these birds

Your care will help to ensure that this wonderful story continues and that future generations can marvel at these amazing birds too.

Some non-migratory birds make Careel Bay their home

These include:

White-faced Heron

A common heron around Sydney, this bird is regularly spotted feeding among the shorelines.

Mangrove Heron

A stealthy and well camouflaged bird. The Mangrove, or Striated Heron, skulks up to its prey with great care before using its long neck to lunge.

Royal Spoonbill

A large white wading bird with a bill that lives up to its name. Spoonbills feed by swinging their bill from side to side as they sift through the shallows in a movement known as "mowing".

Mangrove Gerygone

Careel Bay is the most southerly home of the Mangrove Gerygone (pronounced jer-igun-ee). If you’re fortunate, you may hear this tiny bird warbling from the nearby mangroves

== Landmarks ==
- Careel Creek - A watercourse about 1 km long. It rises about 1 km N of Avalon Golf Course and flows generally N into Careel Bay. Freshwater input to Careel Bay is via Careel Creek, stormwater drains, runoff from residential houses and from direct rainfall
- Careel Head - A headland on the coast about 4 km S by E of Barrenjoey Head and about 1 km NNW of Bangalley Head.
- Careel Headland Reserve - A reserve along the shore extending from Careel Head to Saint Michaels Cave.

== Sports and recreation ==
- Careel Bay Tennis Club – there are five championship sized, floodlit, synthetic grass courts, a large clubhouse with change rooms and showers, a fully stocked pro-shop, free BBQ facilities, picnic tables and an enclosed children's playground. Coaching at the centre is managed by Evolve Tennis who offer a diverse range of quality coaching programs starting with Pee Wee Minis at two years of age all the way to seniors.
- School holiday camps are offered for children aged 4 to 16 years. The camp program includes tennis, futsal, cricket, t-ball, base soccer, basketball and more. Parents can choose full week, single day and half day options – with a full day starting at 9am and finishing at 3pm. In addition, free before and after camp care is offered to allow parents to drop children from 7:30am and collect till 5pm.
- Careel Bay Playing Fields – Open for low Activity use only, Cricket, Baseball, Little Athletics
- Careel Bay Boat Ramp – Concrete dinghy ramp, located at the rear of dinghy storage
- Careel Bay Ecosystem Field Trip

== Parks ==
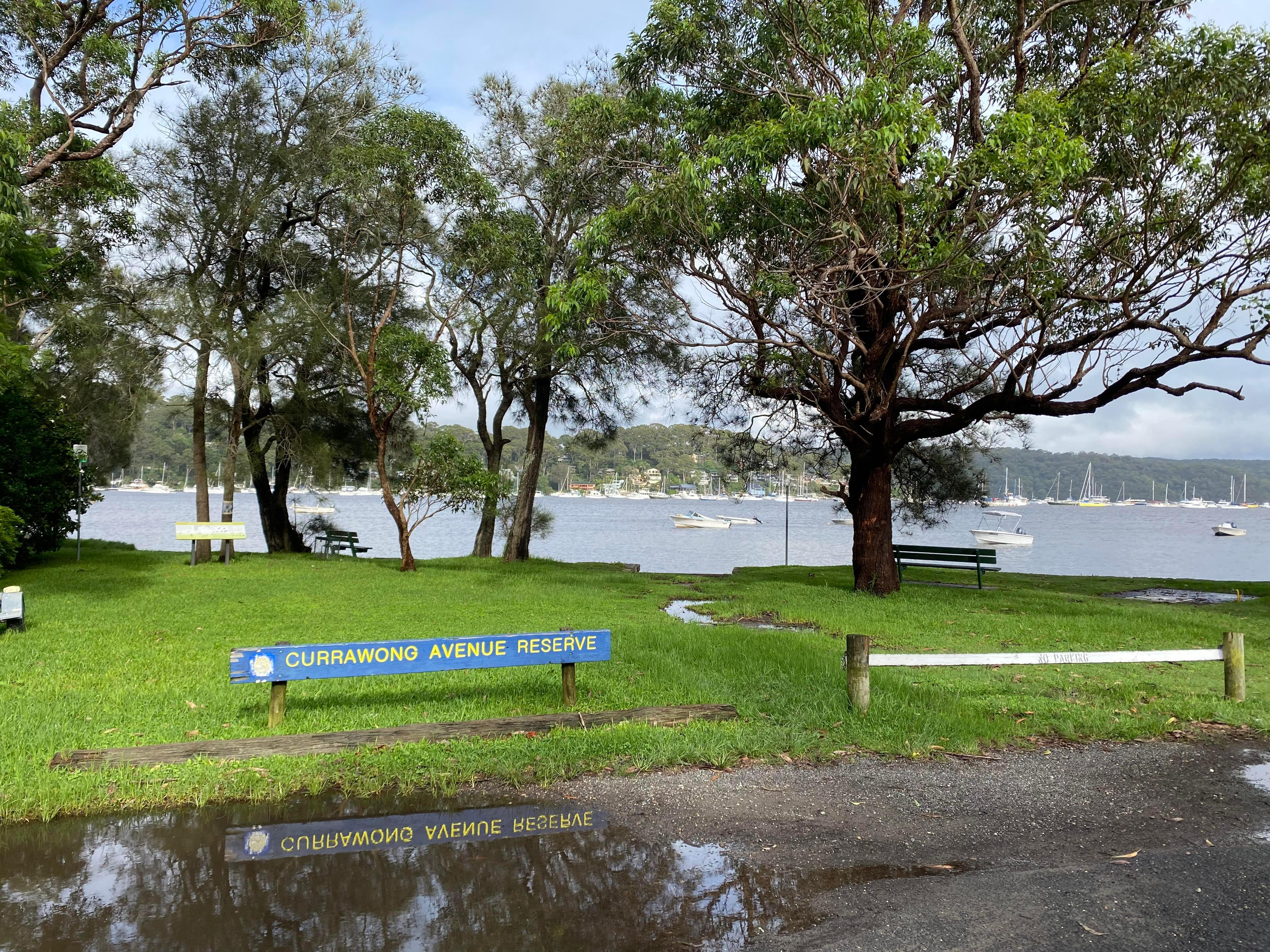
- Currawong Avenue Reserve
  Careel Bay Bushland Reserve – Careel Bay is of high conservation significance due to the range of estuarine wetland vegetation communities it contains. They include mangroves, saltmarsh, seagrass and mudflats. The area is rich in species diversity and provides habitat for rare and threatened native animals which include migratory shorebirds. Dogs and cats are prohibited at all times
- Careel Bay Crescent Reserve
- Currawong Avenue Reserve

== Commercial and marina ==
- Careel Bay Wharf located off George Street at Careel Bay. This wharf is a commuter/commercial wharf and is the main drop off point for heavy materials/machinery for the western foreshore areas. There is a marina adjacent to the wharf
- Careel Bay Dinghy Storage offers waterfront grassed areas. The storage facilities include 53 dinghy spots. This area also includes boat ramp access

== Transport ==
Barrenjoey Road provides access by bus or car. Bus route 199 operated by Keolis Northern Beaches operates to Manly wharf.
