= Palm Beach, New South Wales =

Palm Beach
- Suburb
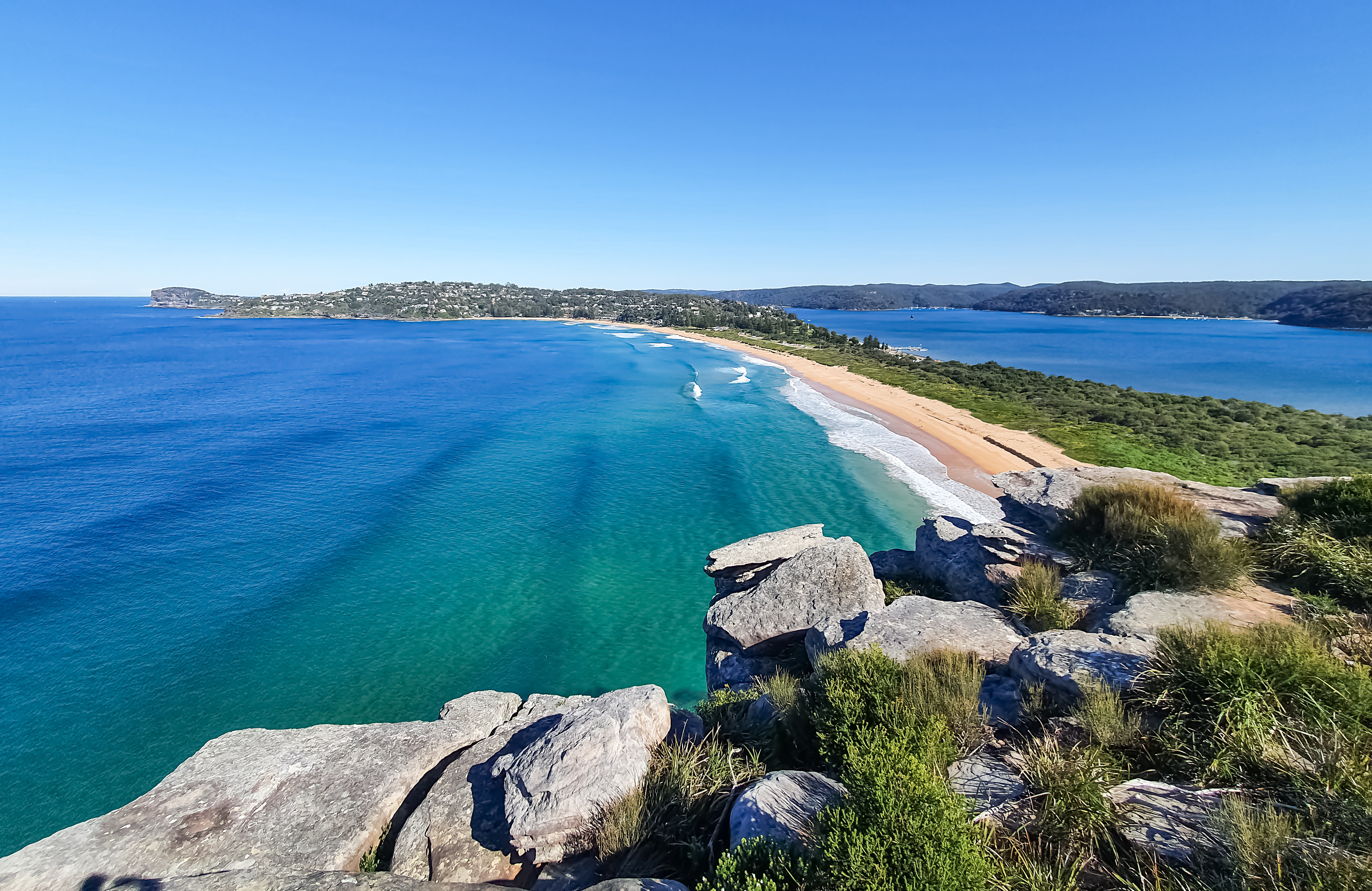
- A view of Palm Beach from Barrenjoey Head Lighthouse

- Interactive map of Palm Beach
- Coordinates: 33°36′00″S 151°19′22″E
- Country: Australia
- State: New South Wales
- City: Sydney
- LGA: Northern Beaches Council
- Location: 41 km (25 mi) north of Sydney CBD
- Established: 1911

Government
  - State electorate: Pittwater
  - Federal division: Mackellar

Area
  - Total: 2.6 km^{2} (1.0 sq mi)
- Elevation: 9 m (30 ft)

Population
  - Total: 1,652 (SAL 2021)
- Postcode: 2108
Suburbs around Palm Beach
	Broken Bay
Pittwater	Palm Beach	Tasman Sea
Clareville	Avalon	Whale Beach

Palm Beach is a suburb in the Northern Beaches of Sydney, in the state of New South Wales, Australia. Palm Beach is located 41 kilometres (25 mi) north of the Sydney central business district, in the local government area of Northern Beaches Council. Palm Beach sits on a peninsula at the end of Barrenjoey Road near Pittwater and is the northernmost beach in the Greater Sydney Metropolitan area. The population of Palm Beach was 1,593 as at the 2016 census.

Palm Beach is sometimes colloquially referred to as 'Palmy'; it is used for exterior filming of the soap opera Home and Away, as the fictional town of Summer Bay. It is also the subject of the 2018 film 'Palm Beach'. Despite the hefty property prices it remains a haven for a variety of artists. Writing celebrating this beach is featured in "Guide to Sydney Beaches" Meuse Press. Palm Beach housing ranges from cottages to grand estates, owned by some of the country's most affluent people. Many affluent and famous people can also be found holidaying at Palm Beach in summer. According to the Australian Taxation Office statistics for the financial year of 2016–2017, Palm Beach and the post code of 2108 was the wealthiest suburb in Australia, with an average taxable income of $230,000.

== Geography ==
Palm Beach is bounded by Broken Bay to the north, the Tasman Sea (within the South Pacific Ocean) to the east, Whale Beach, Avalon and Clareville to the south, and Pittwater to the west. Barrenjoey Headland, which is in the north of the suburb, is part of Ku-ring-gai Chase National Park. The headland at the northernmost point rises quite sharply from the beach to over 100 metres (330 ft) above sea level, and features an operational lighthouse. The narrow sandy isthmus or tombolo linking the south side of the headland to the rest of Palm Beach had extensive fencing and shrub planting undertaken during the 1980s to combat sand erosion.

=== Localities ===
The suburb of Palm Beach also contains the following localities: Barrenjoey, Sand Point, Careel Bay, Paradise Beach and North Avalon.

=== Reserves and bushland ===
Along the cliffs and sanddunes there is much remnant bushland vegetation, located in reserves and national parks, with Barrenjoey headland being part of Ku-ring-gai Chase National Park. These reserves often contain endangered ecological communities, such as Littoral Rainforest, and Pittwater spotted gum forest. See, for example, the articles, McKay Reserve, and Barrenjoey.

=== Landmarks ===
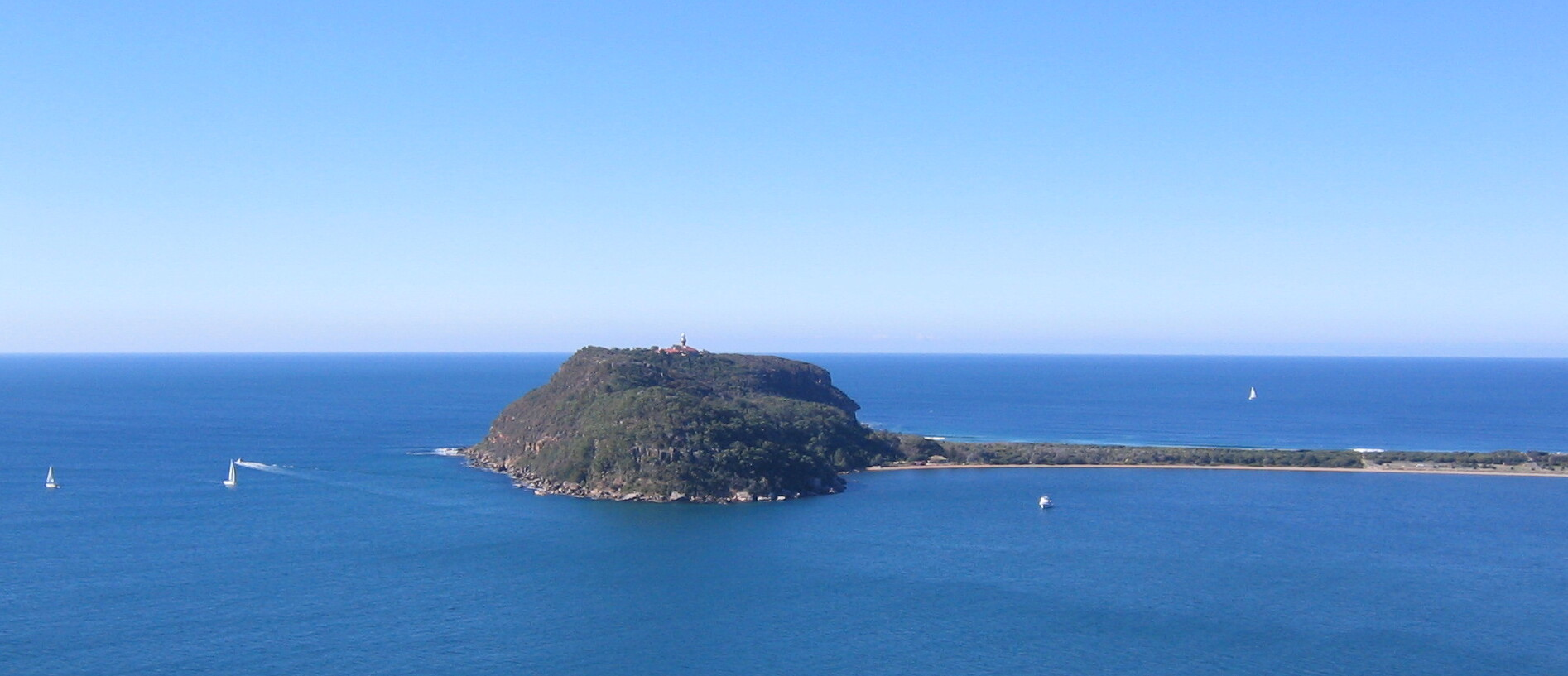
Barrenjoey Headland and Station Beach viewed from West Head

Landmarks include the Barrenjoey Lighthouse, Palm Beach-Boanbong Water Reservoir, Palm Beach-McKay Water Reservoir, Palm Beach-Squaters Lodge, Blueberry Ash, and Iluka Resort Apartments.

The 2.3-kilometre (1.4 mi) long east-facing eponymous beach curves in a gentle arc between the prominent 100-metre (330 ft) high, lighthouse capped, Barrenjoey Head to the sandstone rocks of Little Head in the south, beach linking Barrenjoey to the mainland. North Palm Beach extends 1.4 kilometres (0.87 mi) south from Barrenjoey, with the northern 600 metres (2,000 ft) backed by a 200-metre (660 ft) wide densely vegetated foredune. The southern Palm Beach section includes the southern 600 metres (2,000 ft) of beach, which curves to the southeast in the southern Kiddies Corner. It receives increasing protection from Little Head with waves decreasing in height down the beach. Rips usually extend all the way to the head, though usually smaller in size, with a weak permanent rip against the southern rocks.

== History ==
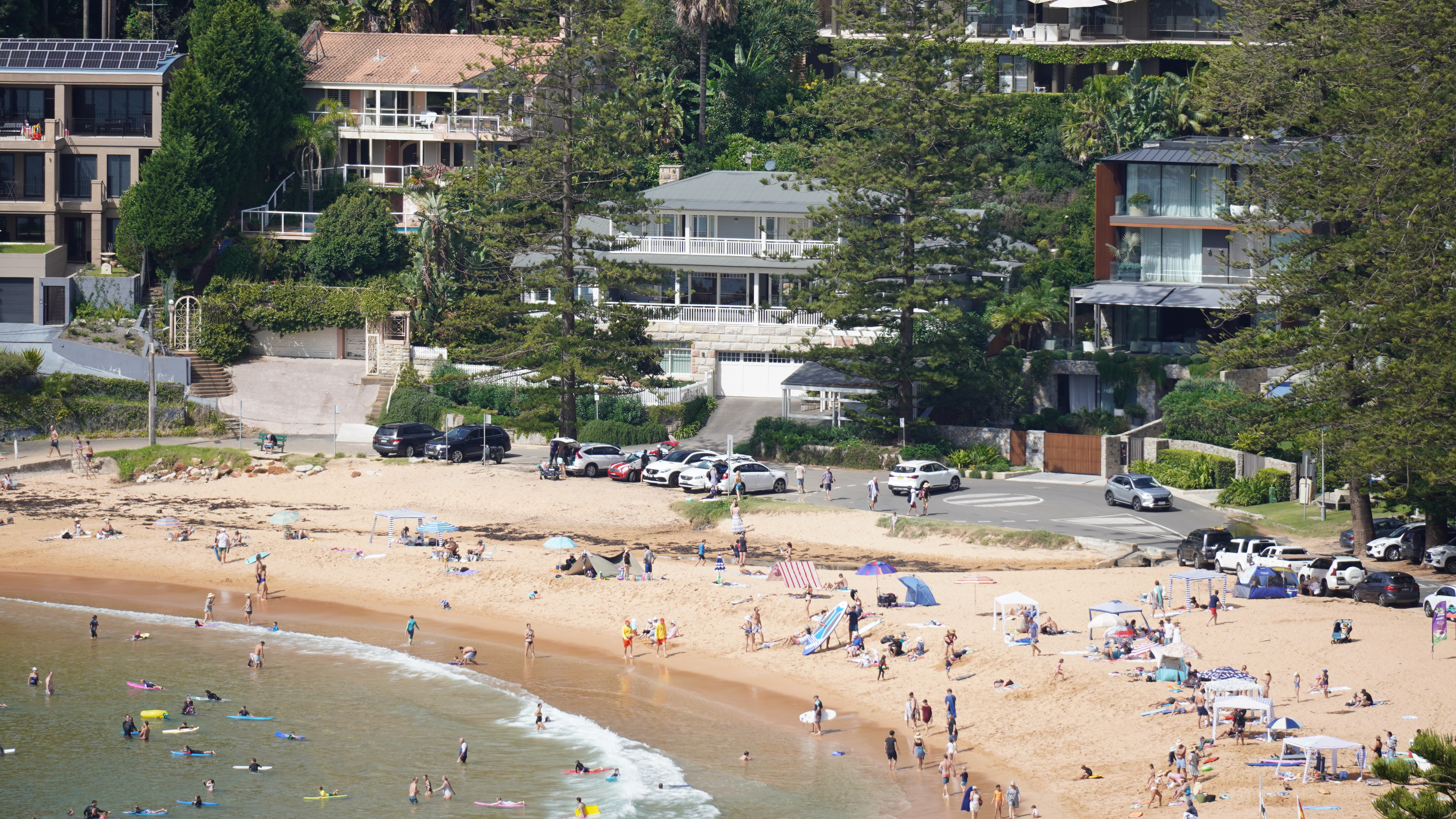
Kiddies Corner at Palm Beach viewed from Sunrise Rd

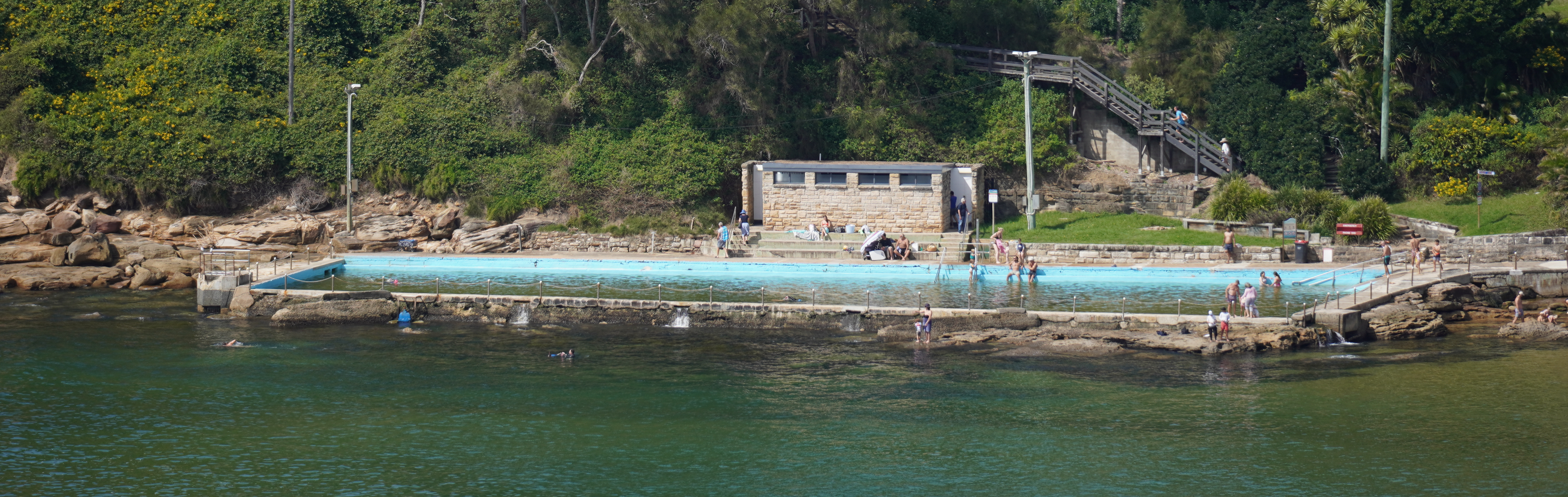
Palm Beach Public Swimming Pool

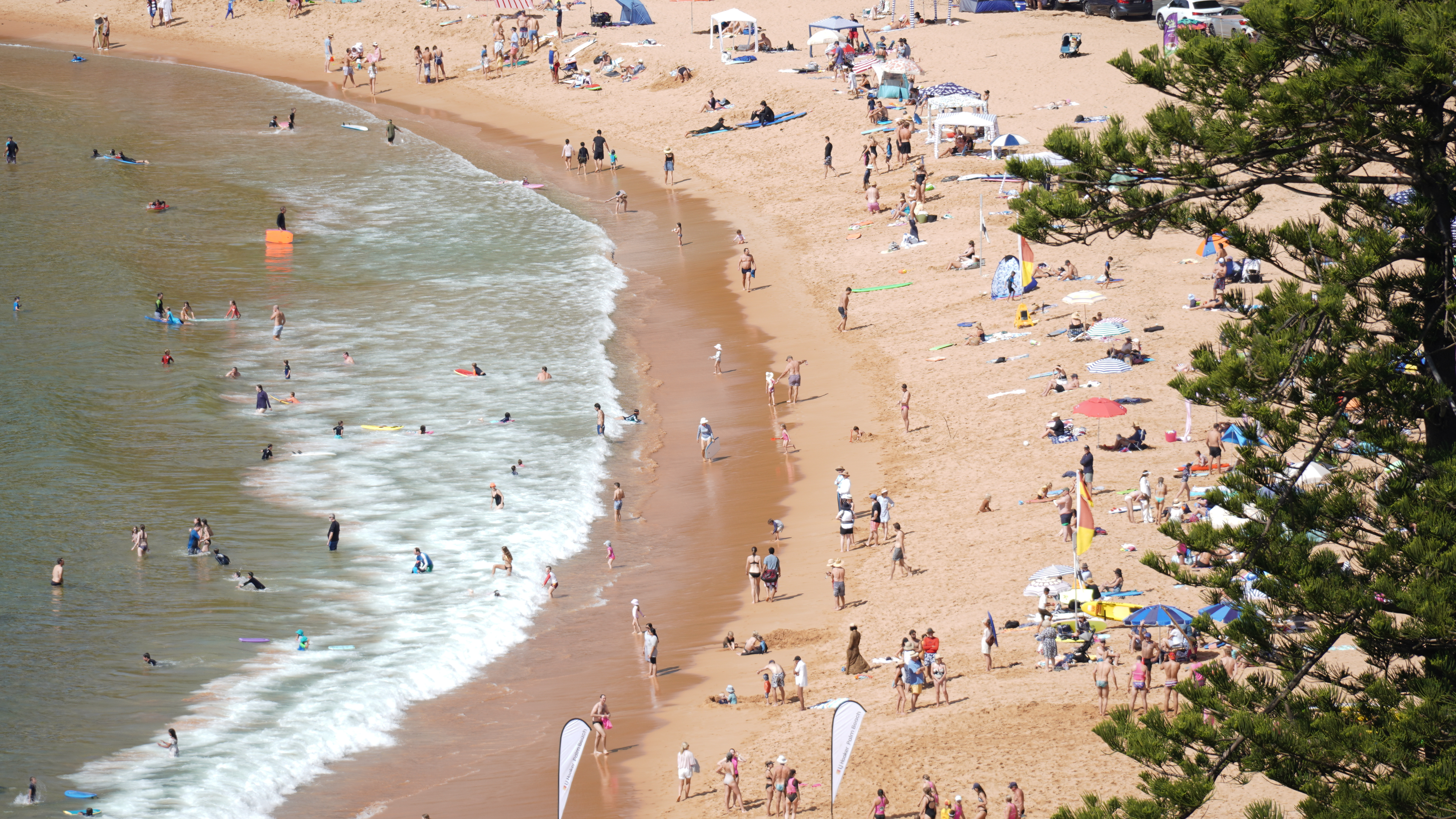
A view of the patrolled swimming area in the southern section of Palm Beach

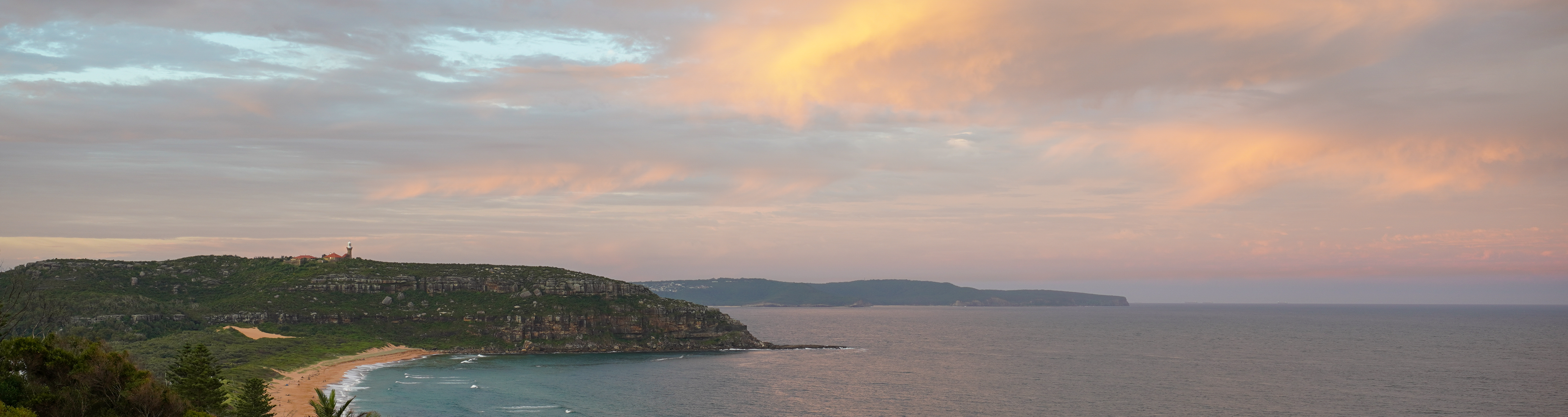
North Palm Beach and Barrenjoey Headland with Killcare Heights and Bouddi National Park in the background

=== Origin of the name ===
The southern end of the Palm Beach is marked as Cabbage Tree Boat Harbour on a map of 1832. Palm Beach was later named after the Cabbage Tree palms Livistona australis that were near Cabbage Tree Boat Harbour. The plant's species name gave origin to Livistona Lane, off Palm Beach Road.

=== European settlement ===
Governor Philip explored the area in 1788, and named the headland 'Barrenjuee', which was an indigenous word apparently meaning 'young kangaroo'. In 1816, Palm Beach, Barrenjoey and most of Whale Beach (160 hectares (400 acres)) was granted to James Napper. During the 19th century, a few Europeans and Chinese lived at Snapperman Beach catching and drying fish. The Southern end of the ocean beach is marked as Cabbage Tree Boat Harbour on a map of 1832. Palm Beach was later named after the Cabbage Tree palms Livistona australis.

In 1900 all land, except Barrenjoey Headland, which had been purchased by the government in 1881, was divided into 18 large blocks, listed as good grazing land, and offered for sale. None sold. In 1912, the land was offered again in smaller residential blocks, offering fishing, sailing, golf and rowing. Most houses were built from local sandstone, other materials were shipped in. Some were guest houses but most were second homes for those who could afford them.

Palm Beach wharf was the terminus reached by boat from Newport or Bayview. Hordern and Wiltshire Parks and Mackay Reserve were donated by RJ Hordern, who lived at Kalua, opposite the beach. Since World War II the area has become more residential but still remains a secluded peninsula at the northern point of Pittwater.

=== Timeline of history ===
- Aboriginal inhabitants in area – Garigal clan of Guringai speaking people. Lands extended from Broken Bay to Port Jackson and to Lane Cove.
- 1770 – Captain Cook names Broken Bay.
- 1788–1789 – Area explored by Governor Arthur Phillip and Captain John Hunter
- 1788 – Arthur Phillip (1738–1814) 2 March 1788, named "Barrenjuee" (Little Kangaroo or Wallaby). Barrenjoey has had at least 9 different names.
- 1806 – A sole ship wreck survivor is rescued by Aboriginals in Broken Bay.
- 1816 Land grant 400 acres (1.6 km^{2}) to Surgeon James Napper RN by Governor Macquarie (1761–1824) – Headland to Whale Beach, 8/– pa.
- 1804 – Pat Flynn had a large garden below Observation Pt (facing Pittwater south of golf course) to supply passing ships.
- 1825 – John Howard, an emancipist who arrived on the first fleet in 1788 lives at Barrenjoey in a cottage with two other fishermen.
- 1843 – Customs Station set up under John B Howard. Near ranger's cottage. Constructed Smugglers Track. Smuggling of rum, brandy, tobacco. Today drugs & narcotics.
- 1840 – Albert Black (1840–1890) becomes customs officer and adopted grandson of merchant Simeon Lord famous in early Sydney.
- 1842 – Four Convicts build a Customs house at Barrenjoey and build a track to the headland.
- 1855 – A navigation light is established on the headland.
- 1863 – A Chinese fishing settlement is established at Snappermans Beach.
- 1881 – Government repurchased headland for £1250 from the Wentworth family.
- 1881 – A stone lighthouse and three cottages are built according to the designs of Colonial Architect James Barnet.
- 1893 – A school is established at Palm Beach.
- 1911 – Palm Beach is subdivided and an extension to Customs house is built.
- 1912 – Telephone is connected to Palm Beach.
- 1916–1919 The oldest bungalows were built at Palm Beach during this period.
- 1921 – Palm Beach Surf Life Saving Club is established.
- 1976 – Barrenjoey customs house burnt down.
- 1978 – Mel Gibson stars in the movie Tim which was filmed mostly at one of the Broken Bay customs houses
- 1988–present – Palm Beach is the location of exterior scenes for Summer Bay, the fictional coastal town featured in the long-running soap opera Home and Away.
- 2004–2005 – Construction of a Museum and a Public Toilet next to the lighthouse.
- 2013 – A fire engulfs the Barrenjoey headland 28 September 2013, threatening to destroy the heritage listed headland. It is contained by local firefighters and no damage to infrastructure was sustained. The bush has slowly recovered.

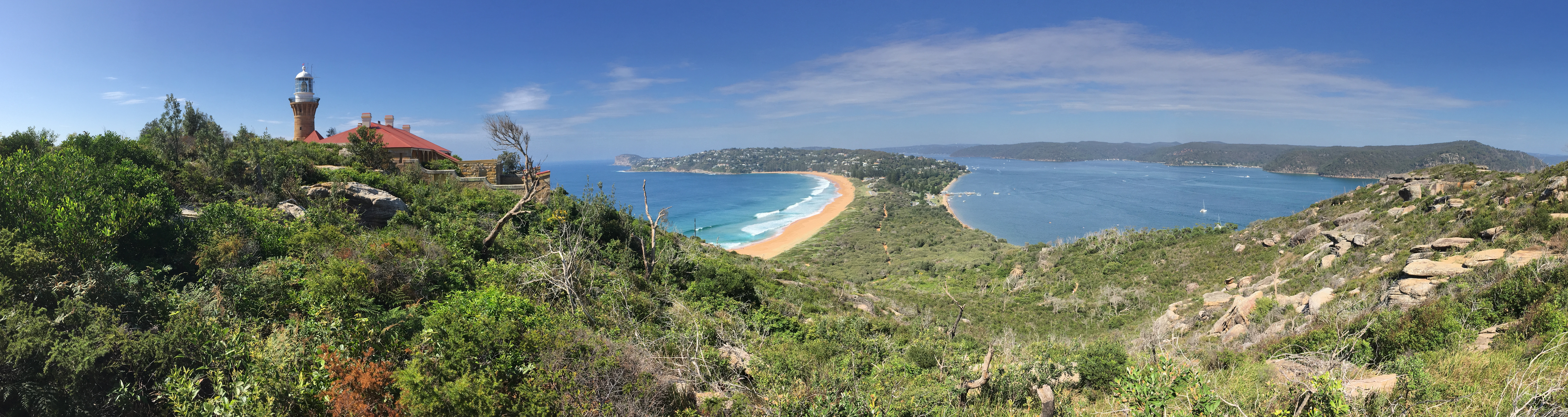
The view south from Barrenjoey Headland

Many historic images of Pittwater and Palm Beach may be found at Pittwater online news: Historic Record of Pittwater

- 2024 – Palm Beach Headland becomes the first Urban Night Sky Place in Australia, spanning 62 hectares of headland.

== Heritage listings ==
Palm Beach has a number of heritage-listed sites, including:

- Barrenjoey Headland: Barrenjoey Head Lighthouse

== Commercial area ==
Facilities in Palm Beach include a milk bar, a large RSL, hairdresser, beautician, preschool, and a number of cafes, restaurants, and bed and breakfast establishments.

== Schools ==
The nearest primary school and high school for people residing in Palm Beach are the Avalon Public School – which is a co-educational primary school catering for students K–6 and Barrenjoey High School – which is a co-educational high school catering for students 7–12. Both are state-funded, public schools. There is also Maria Regina – which is a co-educational Catholic primary school catering for students K–6.

== Transport ==
Palm Beach Seaplanes operate seaplane services from Palm Beach to Rose Bay in Sydney's Eastern Suburbs, Cottage Point and Berowra Waters. Palm Beach Water Airport is located at the north end of Governor Phillip Drive and Golf Drive, just south of the headland. The Palm Beach Ferry (operated by NRMA Marine) runs a service from a wharf in the town center to Ettalong Beach, Great Mackerel Beach, Currawong Beach, Coasters Retreat and The Basin.

The Palm Beach Ferry which connects the suburb to the Central Coast provides an important tourist route for visitors to the suburb and commuter link to the Central Coast. Ettalong Beach is serviced by regular Busways bus services with connections to Woy Woy railway station, the Umina Beach retail center, Gosford, Kincumber, and Erina Fair. The nearest railway station to Palm Beach is in Woy Woy.

Palm Beach and Hawkesbury River Cruises runs a ferry service from Palm Beach wharf to Patonga. Barrenjoey Road provides access by bus or car. Bus route 199 operated by Keolis Northern Beaches operates to Manly wharf.

== Sport and recreation ==
Palm Beach has a number of parks, beaches, and sporting areas, including part of the Ku-ring-gai Chase National Park, and the beach which gives the area its name. Careel Bay Ovals Sporting Complex includes facilities for rugby league, soccer and tennis.

Palm Beach has a golf club, sailing club, surf school and two surf lifesaving clubs. The North Palm Beach Surf Life Saving Club, is used as a set for television soap opera Home and Away and has 'Summer Bay Surf Club' painted on the beach side. Palm Beach Surf Life Saving Club, founded in 1921 (at the south end of the beach), is patrolled by paid surf lifesavers on weekdays during summer and by volunteers from the Palm Beach SLSC on weekends. The Surf Club is one of the biggest in NSW, with members coming from all over Sydney. The beach also attracts rock climbers, due to there being two sandstone boulders with highly featured vertical and overhanging features allowing for bouldering.

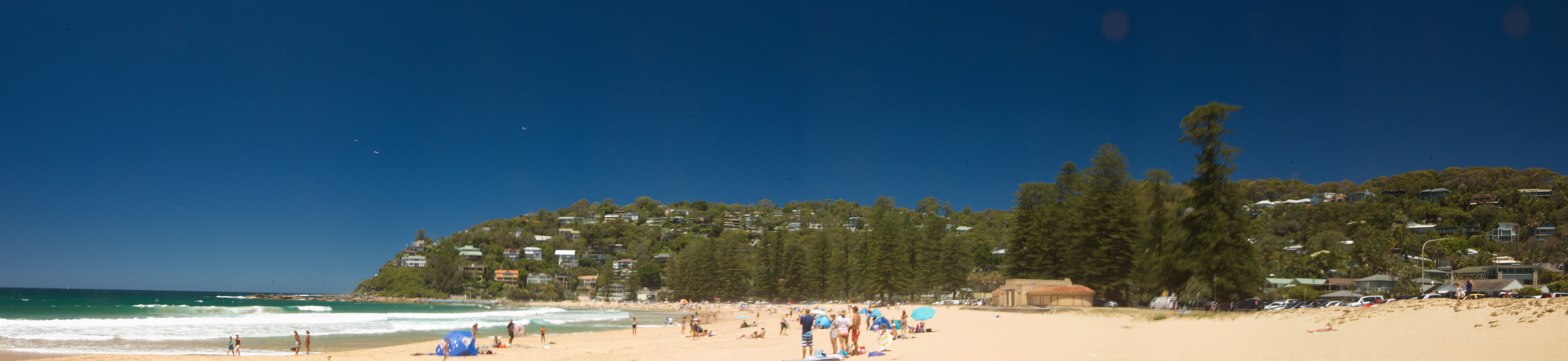
Palm Beach Panorama (looking south)

=== Clubs ===
- Avalon Soccer Club
- Avalon Rugby League Club
- Cabbage Tree Club
- Careel Bay Tennis Club
- North Palm Beach Surf Life Saving Club
- Pacific Club
- Palm Beach Golf Club
- Palm Beach Sailing Club
- Palm Beach Surf Life Saving Club

== In popular culture ==
- Palm Beach (2019 Film)
- Palm Beach (1980 Film)
- Palm Beach Road is referred to in the lyrics of the song "Deep Water" by Australian singer-songwriter Richard Clapton.
- The music video for Train on a Track by Kelly Rowland was filmed here.
- Palm Beach has been used as the location for the town of Summer Bay in the TV series Home and Away.

== See also ==
- List of Sydney suburbs
