= Whale Beach, New South Wales =

Whale Beach
- Suburb
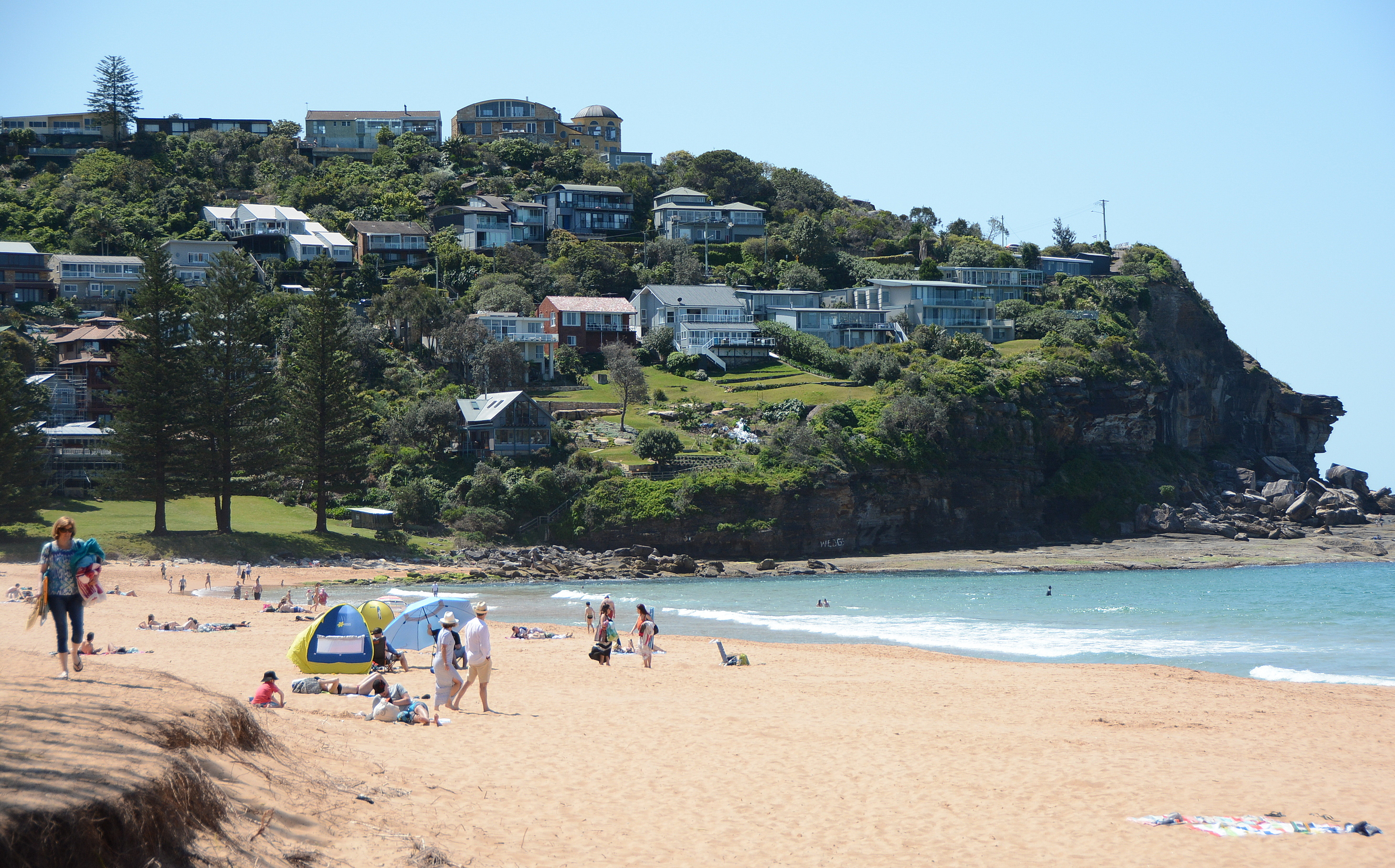
- Whale Beach

- Interactive map of Whale Beach
- Country: Australia
- State: New South Wales
- City: Sydney
- LGA: Northern Beaches Council
- Location: 40 km (25 mi) north of Sydney CBD

Government
  - State electorate: Pittwater
  - Federal division: Mackellar
- Elevation: 26 m (85 ft)

Population
  - Total: 315 (SAL 2021)
- Postcode: 2107
Suburbs around Whale Beach
Palm Beach	Palm Beach
Palm Beach	Whale Beach	Tasman Sea
Clareville	Avalon Beach

Whale Beach is a northern beachside suburb of Sydney, in the state of New South Wales, Australia. Whale Beach is located 40 kilometres (25 miles) north of the Sydney central business district, in the local government area of Northern Beaches Council, in the Northern Beaches region.

== Description ==
At the northern end of the beach, just off the rocks, is a well-known surf break called the Wedge. Immediately west of the beach is the Whale Beach Surf Life Saving Club.

== History ==
Whale Beach is the location of a distinctive home designed by the architect Alexander Stewart Jolly. On Careel Head, overlooking Whale Beach, Careel House is a single-storey bungalow made from sandstone blocks that were quarried at the site. Heritage-listed, it was built in 1931.

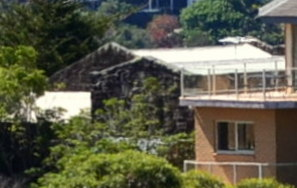
Careel House

Whale Beach is home to The Big Swim, an ocean swim of several kilometres from Palm Beach to Whale Beach. The Big Swim is held in January each year since 1974. In 2026 it was cancelled for only the second time in its history following four shark attacks in 48 hours at nearby beaches.
