= Barrenjoey High School =

Location
- Avalon Beach, New South Wales; Australia; 33°37′51″S 151°20′3″E

Information
- Type: Government-funded co-educational comprehensive secondary day school
- Motto: Respect Effort Challenge
- Established: 1968; 58 years ago
- School district: Pittwater
- Educational authority: NSW Department of Education
- Principal: Brett Blaker
- Years: 7–12
- Enrolment: 865 (2025)
- Campus: Suburban
- Houses: Akuna; Tingara; Iluka; Maluka
- Colours: Green, red, white and black
- Newspaper: Peninsula Press
- Website: barrenjoey-h.schools.nsw.gov.au

Barrenjoey High School is a government-funded co-educational comprehensive secondary day school, located in Avalon Beach, a suburb in the Northern Beaches of Sydney, New South Wales, Australia.

Established in 1968, the school catered for approximately 831 students in 2023, from Year 7 to Year 12, including less than one percent of whom identified as Indigenous Australians and 14 percent were from a language background other than English. The school is operated by the NSW Department of Education; the principal is Brett Blaker.

== Overview ==
The first student intake was in 1968 with a single grade (known at the time as 'Form 1') which formally graduated from the school in 1973. The inaugural graduating year of 1973 remains close-knit and has recently held a reunion with an outstanding number of students in attendance (more than 70, close to 40 years after last seeing each other).

The location of the school right at the beach lends itself to many curricular and non-curricular beach activities.

Over ensuing years, the school has grown in enrolments to its current level, necessitating expansion of the campus and construction of additional facilities.

Barrenjoey's feeder primary schools include Avalon Public School, Bilgola Plateau Public School and a few other schools in the local area.

== House system ==
In 2009, Barrenjoey High School introduced the house system. Students are placed into one of the four houses in Year 7. The houses are made up in alphabetical order, according to students last name. The four houses are named Maluka (blue), Akuna (yellow), Iluka (red) and Tingara (green). Students can win 'house points' through various activities including receiving merit certificates and participating in school carnivals. But, by the end of 2018, this system had been terminated. The system was reinstated in 2023.

== Community involvement ==
Barrenjoey High School is actively involved in the Avalon community. The SRC chooses a charity each year to support. Various teachers have participated in Movember in 2014 and 2015, raising over $2,700 towards prostate cancer and testicular cancer research. Their team is called Barrenmoey.

== Notable alumni ==
- Kirin J Callinan – musician
- Nyree Osieck – rugby union player
- The Rions – indie rock band
- Nina Curtis – sailor and silver medalist at the 2012 Summer Olympics
- Chelsea Georgeson – world surfing champion
- Sam Harris – rugby union and rugby league player; played with the NSW Waratahs, Manly Sea Eagles and Wests Tigers
- Ben Player – world champion bodyboarder
- Angus Stone – musician
- Julia Stone – musician
- Wendy Sharpe – artist and winner of the 1996 Archibald Prize
- Sam Verrills – rugby league player

== See also ==
- List of government schools in New South Wales: A–B
