= Newport, New South Wales =

Newport
- Suburb
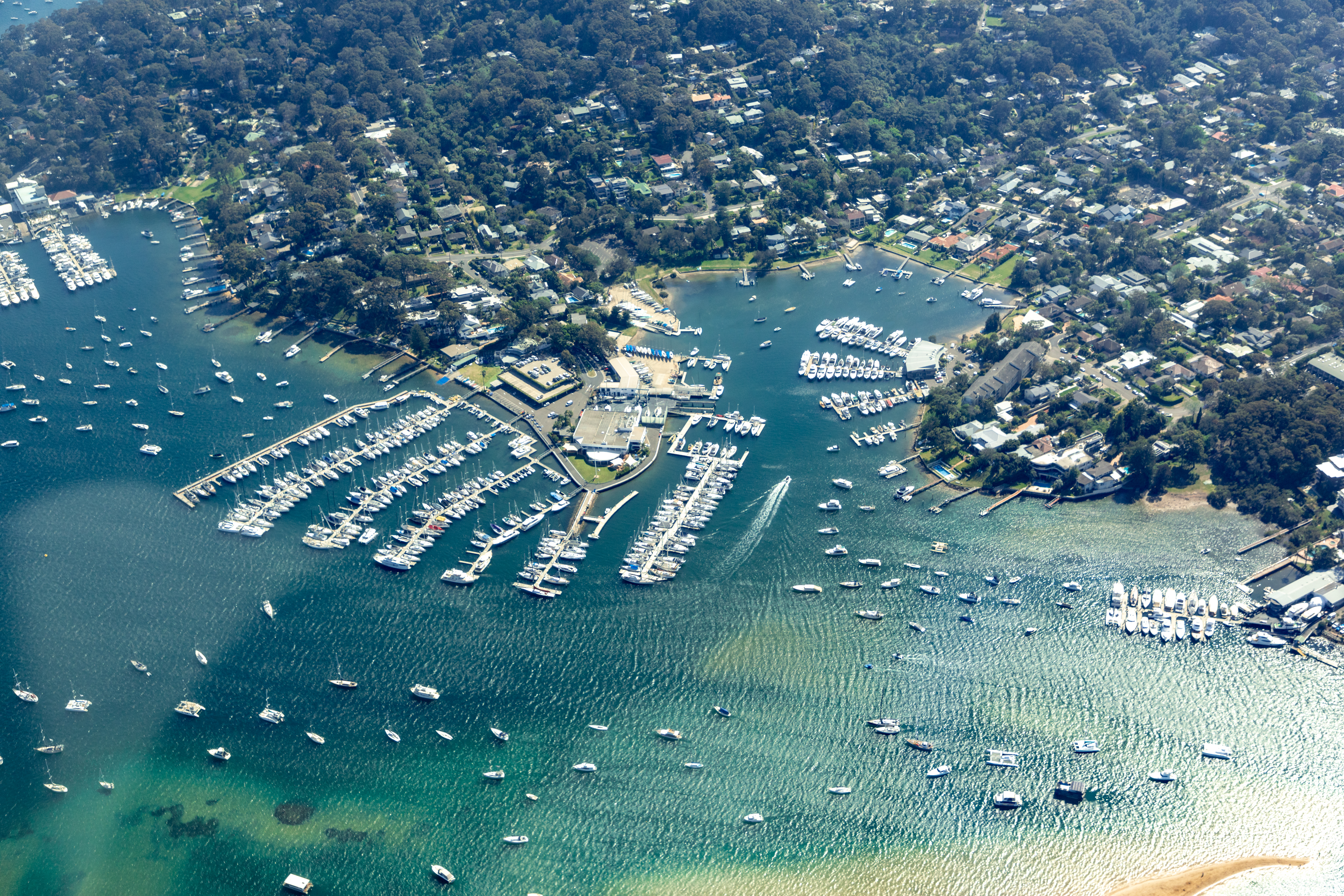
- Newport, New South Wales

- Interactive map of Newport
- Country: Australia
- State: New South Wales
- LGA: Northern Beaches Council
- Location: 31 km (19 mi) north of Sydney CBD

Government
  - State electorate: Pittwater
  - Federal division: Mackellar
- Elevation: 9 m (30 ft)

Population
  - Total: 9,659 (SAL 2021)
- Postcode: 2106
Suburbs around Newport
Bilgola Plateau	Bilgola Beach	Tasman Sea
Bayview	Newport	Tasman Sea
Mona Vale	Mona Vale	Tasman Sea

Newport is a suburb of northern Sydney in the state of New South Wales, Australia, in the local government area of Northern Beaches Council. It is part of the Northern Beaches region.

== History ==
Prior to European colonisation, the Newport area was considered to be inhabited by the Guringai (Kuringgai) people, however recent research suggests that this language group was more localised to the Broken Bay district and should more appropriately be defined as Karikal or Garigal. Shell middens from Aboriginal inhabitants are still visible both on the Pittwater side in Salt Pan Cove, as well as on the ocean facing cliff-side banks.

Newport derived its name from being a "new port" for steamers carrying passengers and cargo such as local shell lime and firewood. Bungan Castle is a medieval-style stone castle on Bungan Head built in 1919 by Adolph Albers, a German art dealer. In 1978, the area came to national attention due to the disappearance of Trudie Adams.

== Demographics ==
In the 2021 Census, there were 9,659 people in Newport. 74.7% of people were born in Australia. The next most common countries of birth were England 7.8%, New Zealand 1.7% and South Africa 1.3%. 89.8% of people spoke only English at home. The most common responses for religion were No Religion 46.7%, Catholic 18.8% and Anglican 17.5%.

== Geography ==
Newport sits between the Pacific Ocean to the east and Pittwater to the west. A major road along the peninsula is Barrenjoey Road.

Its ocean beach is patrolled by Newport Surf Life Saving Club. On the shores of Pittwater are several marinas and small shipyards, including the Royal Prince Alfred Yacht Club and the Royal Motor Yacht Club, serving mainly pleasure craft. Newport also features many cafes and restaurants, as well as the Newport Arms Hotel on the shore of Pittwater.

== Churches ==
Newport Anglican Church meets next to the Post Office on Foamcrest Avenue at 8am and 10am each Sunday. Originally established on Queen's Parade in 1924, the original building was moved to its current site in 1952, where it presently functions as a church hall. The current church building was opened in 1960.

Pittwater Presbyterian Church has been ministering to the people of Newport and the surrounding suburbs since 1967.

== Sport clubs ==
- Newport Breakers Rugby Club
- Newport Breakers Netball Club
- Newport Surf Life Saving Club
- Mona Vale Juniors Rugby League Club

== Gallery ==
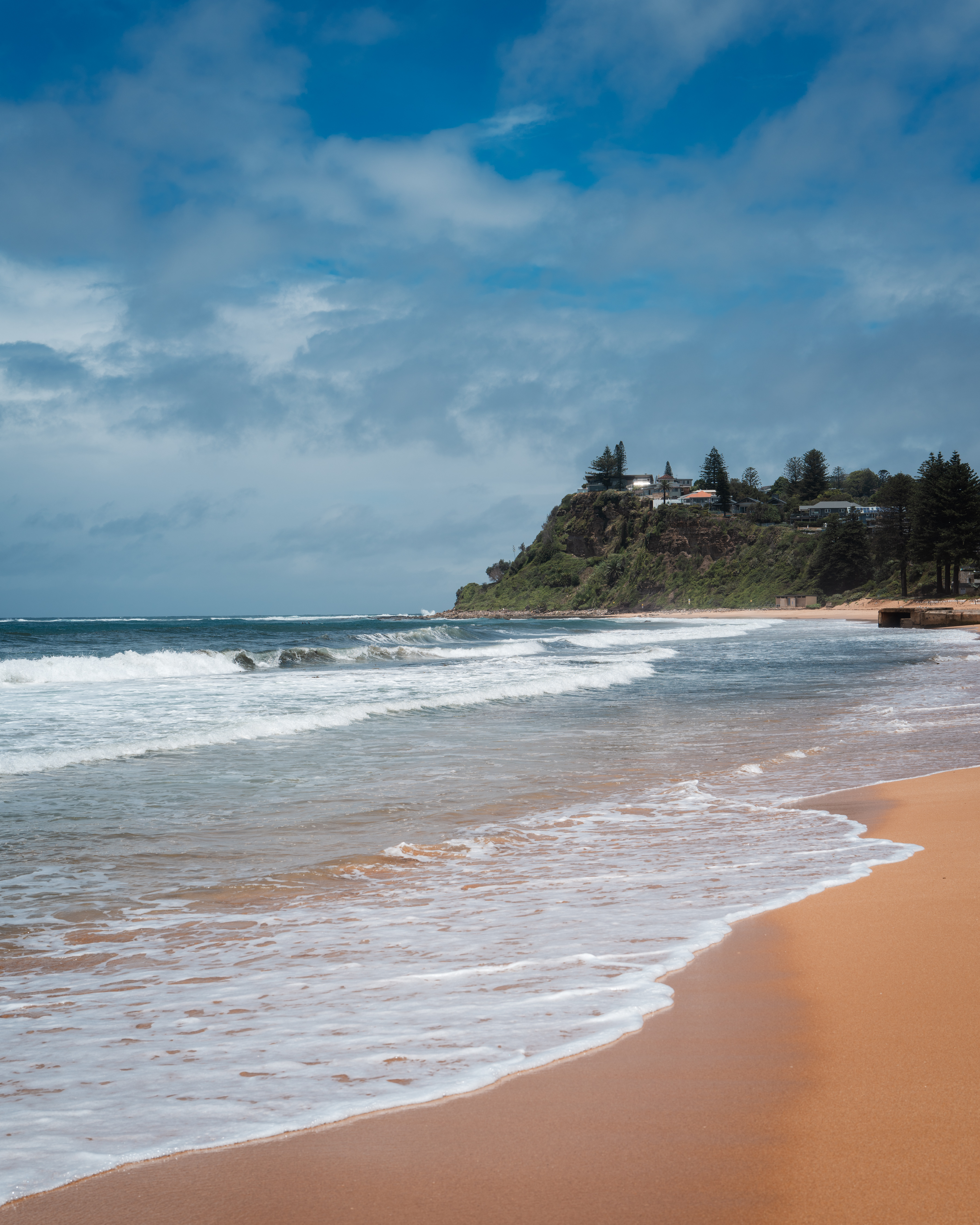
Newport Beach, view to the north

== Schools ==
- Newport Public School, the school bag of which appears in the film clip for the song "Lift" by Australian pop music sensation Shannon Noll.

== Localities ==
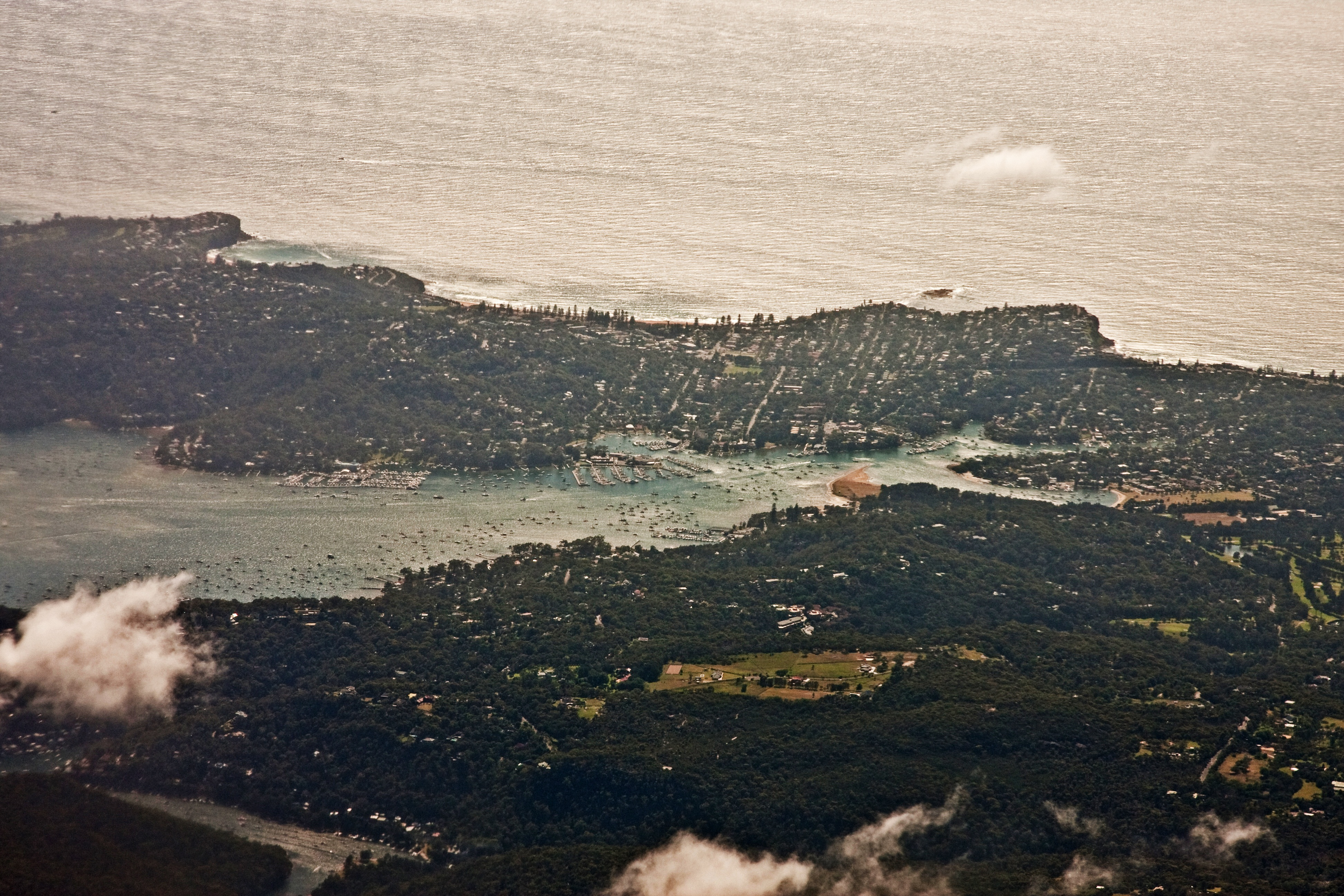
Newport overview

- Bungan Head
- Salt Pan Cove

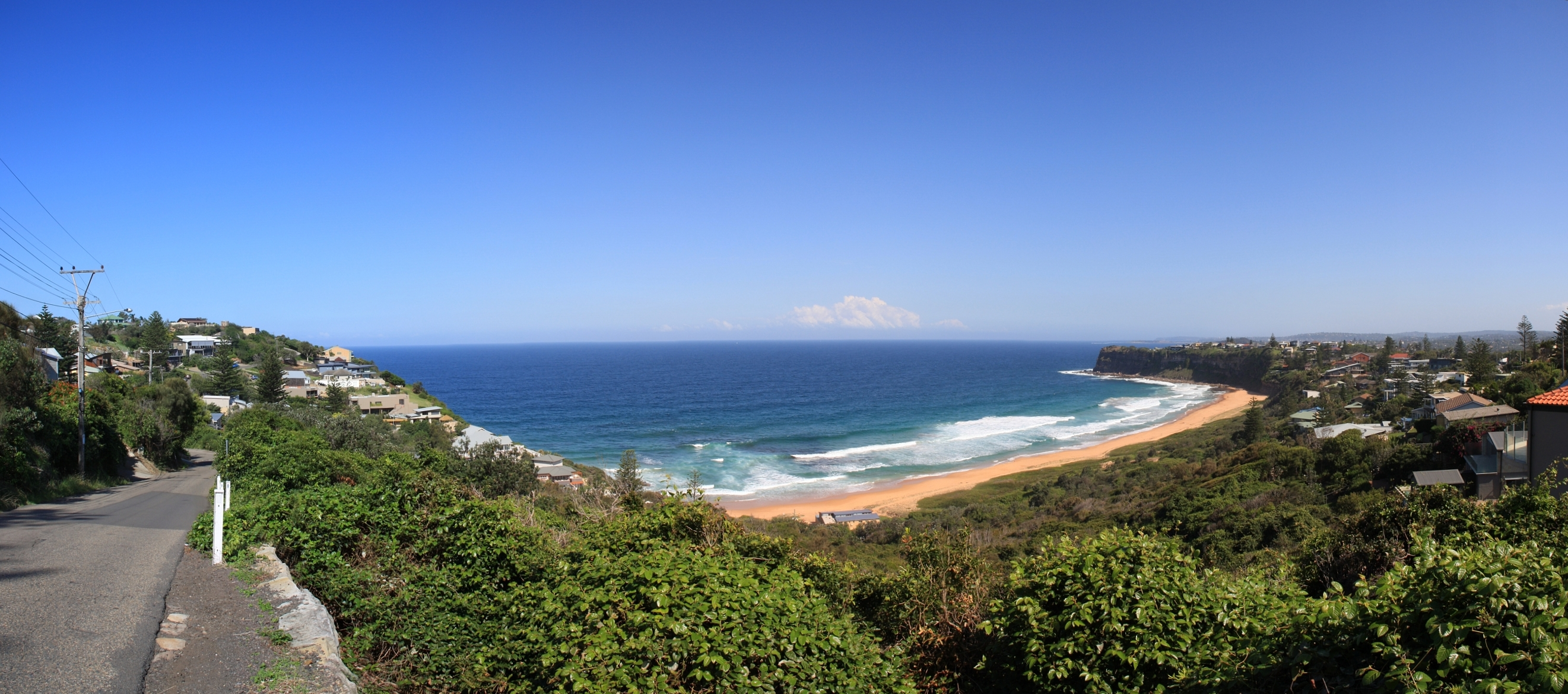
Bungan beach
