= Clareville, New South Wales =

Clareville
- Suburb
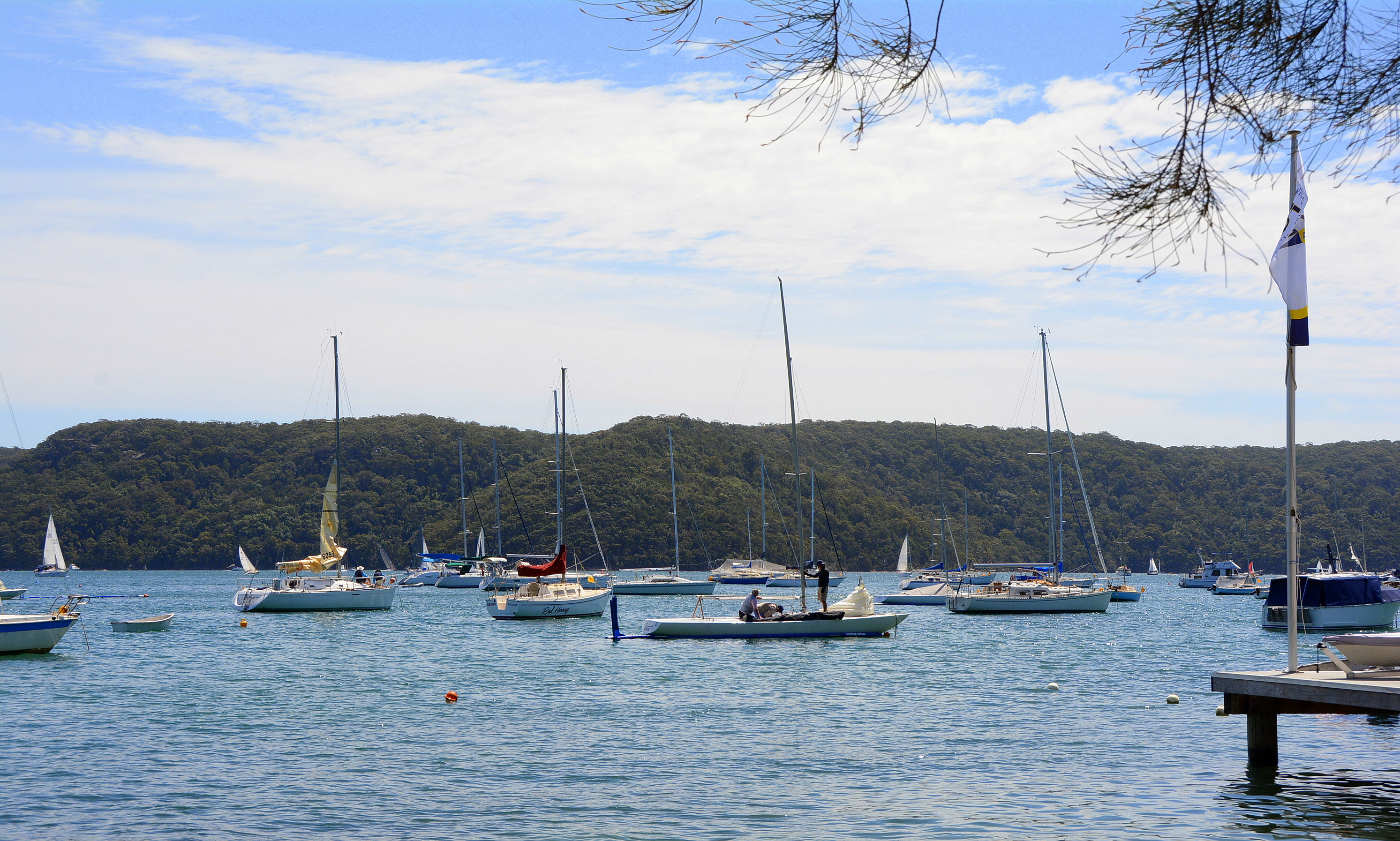
- Clareville, New South Wales

- Interactive map of Clareville
- Country: Australia
- State: New South Wales
- City: Sydney
- LGA: Northern Beaches Council
- Location: 36 km (22 mi) north-east of Sydney CBD

Government
  - State electorate: Pittwater
  - Federal division: Mackellar
- Elevation: 13 m (43 ft)

Population
  - Total: 822 (2021 census)
- Postcode: 2107
Suburbs around Clareville
	Avalon Beach	Avalon Beach
Scotland Island	Clareville	Bilgola Plateau
	Newport	Newport

Clareville is a suburb in northern Sydney, in the state of New South Wales, Australia. Clareville is 36 kilometres north-east of the Sydney central business district, in the local government area of Northern Beaches Council. Clareville is part of the Northern Beaches region.

Clareville is bordered by Avalon Beach, Bilgola Plateau and Newport. Clareville Beach and Taylors Point are localities within the suburb.

== Clareville ==
In the 1830s, two large land grants were made to a Catholic priest, Father John Joseph Therry (1790–1864), who had arrived in Sydney in May 1820. The grant included what is now known as Clareville. It is thought that the suburb has historically been accessed by the water. In the early 1920s, the area was subdivided and Sydney residents purchased holiday homes. In the 1950s, with the increase in motor car use, the area became a residential zone. Houses in the area are now expensive, with many having water frontages and views.

== Heritage listings ==
Clareville has a number of heritage-listed sites, including:

- 62 Chisholm Road: Hy Brasil

== Demographics ==
According to the 2021 census of Population, there were 822 people in Clareville. 69.6% of people were born in Australia. The next most common countries of birth were England 9.4%, United States of America 1.8%, South Africa 1.7%, New Zealand 1.5% and Sweden 1.1%. 87.8% of people spoke only English at home. Other languages spoken at home included German 1.0%, Swedish 0.6%, Spanish 0.5%, Dutch 0.4% and Afrikaans 0.4%. The most common responses for religion in Clareville were No Religion, so described 47.3%, Anglican 17.6%, Catholic 16.5%, Not stated 7.7% and Christian, not further defined 2.2%.

== Residents ==
- Norah Telford Burnard (1902–1979), school dental supervisor and journal editor
- Bob Norton OBE (1922–1992), a former president of the Royal Australasian College of Dental Surgeons lived in Clareville.
- Morris West (1916–1999), author.
- Iain Murray (1958-), America's Cup sailor and yacht designer.
