= List of Australian crime podcasts =

This is a list of Australian crime podcasts from 2015 (the earliest podcast) to the present.

== Background ==
Podcasting, and in particular true-crime related podcasts which deal primarily with serial murders, kidnappings, disappearances, and unsolved crimes or unexplained mysteries, became popular as a media format in Australia starting in 2016. While some podcasts are privately produced, many are created by investigative journalists within media outlets such as The Daily Telegraph, The Australian, ABC, or SBS. Most detail individual cases across a short series of episodes (e.g. Cop Tales at 1 episode) while others (e.g. Australian True Crime) issue individual, or sometimes serial, episodes on different cases weekly.

Most podcasts act to provide background detail on already well known cases (e.g. A Perfect Storm and the Chamberlain case) while also updating cases for recent developments, investigations, or trials (e.g. Claremont: The Trial). Others, particularly with cold cases, make appeals to the public for information (e.g. The Alibi). Many also work to provide extrajudicial perspectives on the cases they cover. More recently, "survivor" podcasts, hosted by ex-criminals who were victims of childhood sexual abuse (e.g. The Clink, The Stick Up) have become more common. Some are criticised as potentially complicating, or compromising, ongoing police investigations (e.g. The Teacher's Pet). Others can be seen as providing a form of entertainment from crimes or confirming societal or institutional unconscious biases.

Some shows have become well known internationally (e.g. Casefile) and others have gone on to provoke significant breakthroughs (e.g. Trace, which in 2019 prompted the parliament of Victoria to change legislation, which allowed the state coroner to then commence a new inquest into the Maria James murder case). A similar situation occurred with The Lady Vanishes which led to an inquest commencing in New South Wales in 2020. Another podcast, The Nurse, helped trigger a Commission of Inquiry in Tasmania in 2020. In February 2022, revelations from Shandee's Story prompted the coronial inquest into her disappearance to reopen alongside two wider inquiries into Queensland's state-run forensics lab.

== Awards ==
In 2018, The Teacher's Pet won the Gold Walkley for excellence in Australian journalism. In 2019, Wrong Skin, won in two categories of the annual Australian Podcast Awards: Investigative Journalism & True Crime, and the inaugural Podcast of the Year. In 2020, Birds Eye View was awarded Podcast of the Year and Unravel: Snowball was awarded Best True Crime Podcast. More recently, The Nurse was awarded 2021's Best True Crime Podcast, The Greatest Menace won in 2022 (with The Last Outlaws winning Podcast of the Year), and Inside The Tribe won in 2023. In 2024, Breaking Badness won the best Documentary category and Unravel: Firebomb won best True Crime. In 2025, Dear Rachelle and One Minute Remaining won the Australian Audio Awards crime podcast category.

== List ==
Podcast	Year start	Year end	Topic/person covered	Host	Produced by	Ref
12 Minute True Crime	2022	2023	various	Jay Walkerden	Podshape True Crime	
A Perfect Storm	2019	2020	Azaria Chamberlain	John Buck	Seven West Media	
A Shout from the Long Grass	2018	2018	Stringybark Creek murders	Ralph Stavely	Victoria Police	
AI Crime Time	2025	present	AI generated crime stories	AI generated voices	Podshape True Crime	
All Aussie Mystery Hour	2018	2020	various	Josie Rozenberg-Clarke; Melissa Mason	Pedestrian Podcast Network	
Alva Beach: Death at the Door	2025	2025	killings at Alva Beach	Adam Hegarty	Tapt Podcasts	
Annette: Cold Case Unlocked	2019	2019	Annette Deverell	Carla Hildebrandt	Australian Community Media	
Australian True Crime	2017	present	various	Meshel Laurie; Emily Webb	Australian True Crime Podcast	
Background Briefing	2006	present	various	various	ABC Australia	
Bad Detective: The Rogerson Files	2016	2016	Roger Rogerson	Mark Morri	The Daily Telegraph	
Badge of Betrayal	2025	2025	Paul Reynolds	Jay Walkerden	Podshape	
Ballarat's Children	2016	2016	Clerical paedophilia in Ballarat	Peter Hoysted	The Australian	
Beenham Valley Road	2019; 2021	2022	Kirra McLoughlin	Jamie Pultz; Tom Daunt	Six10 Media	
Behind the Doors of Domestic Violence	2023	2023	domestic violence	Dean Cooper	Queensland Police Service	
Best Served Cold	2020	2022	various	Laura Elise; Tama Jay	(independent)	
Bikies Inc.	2023	2023	Outlaw motorcycle gangs	Mike Phelan	Crime X	
Birds Eye View	2020	2020	Darwin Correctional Centre inmates	various	StoryProjects	
Blood Territory	2019	2019	Jim O'Connell	Mark Whittaker	Audible	
Bloodguilt	2021	2021	Richard Dorrough	Dan Box	Audible	
Bloody Murder	2017	2021	various	Tara Sariban; Barney Black	(independent)	
Bondi Badlands	2021	2024	Murders and disappearances in Bondi Beach	Greg Callaghan	The Age; The Sydney Morning Herald	
Bowraville	2016	2016	Bowraville murders	Dan Box	The Australian	
Breaking Badness	2023	2023	various	Gary Jubelin	Crime X	
Bring Home Sandrine	2022	2023	Sandrine Jourdan	Graeme Crowley	Graeme Crowley	
Bronwyn	2024	2025	Bronwyn Winfield	Hedley Thomas	Crime X	
Casefile (Note: Cases 19, 30, 55 unavailable for downloading)	2016	present	various	Anonymous (Casefile host)	Casefile Presents	
Catching Dad's Killer	2024	2024	Disappearance of Bob Dickie	Jay Walkerden	Podschape True Crime	
Catching Lisa's Killer	2024	2025	Disappearance of Lisa Govan	Natalie Bonjolo; Ben Harvey	The West Australian	
Chasing Charlie	2020	2020	Paul Bryan Gill	Julia Robson	Fremantle Media Australia	
Childers	2020; 2025	2025	Childers Palace Backpackers Hostel fire	Paul Cochrane	(independent)	
Claremont Serial Killings	2019	2019	Claremont serial killings	(not stated)	Post Newspapers	
Claremont: The Trial	2019	2020	Claremont serial killings	Natalie Bonjolo; Tim Clarke; Alison Fan; Kate Ryan	The West Australian	
Class Act	2021	2021	Neil Lennie	Ashley Argoon; Genevieve Alison	Herald Sun	
Closing the Net	2021	2021	Online child abuse	Rodger Corser; Caroline Craig	Australian Centre to Counter Child Exploitation	
Clunes Cluedo	2019	2019	Nina Nicholson	Alice Mitchell	(independent)	
Coffee and Crime	2026	present	various	"Linda"	(independent)	
Cocaine Inc.	2024	2024	Cocaine industry	Fiona Hamilton; David Collins; Stephen Drill	Crime X	
Cold Case: Western Australia	2023	2024	various	Neil Poh	Western Australia Police	
Conviction	2023	2024	various	Craig Goozee	Three Ring Circus	
Cop Tales	2016	2016	Ross Edwards	Mark Morri	The Daily Telegraph	
Cop That	2020	2020	various	Jamie Pultz	Six10 Media	
Cops Crims and Cocaine	2022	2022	various	Andrew Rule; Andrew Fraser	Crime X	
Court In The Act	2023	2024	various	Tim Clarke; Bernard Standish	The West Australian	
Cowper	2019	2019	Grafton bus crash	Mary Gardiner	Grafton Daily Examiner	
Crim City	2023	2023	various	Mark Morri; Josh Hanrahan	Crime X	
Crime at Bedtime	2024	2024	various	Jack Laurence	Mashed Pumpkin Production	
Crime in Focus	2024	2025	various	Tara Cassidy	LiSTNR	
Crime Insiders	2023	2025	various	Kathryn Fox (Forensics); Brent Sanders (Detectives)	LiSTNR, Southern Cross Austereo	
Crime Insiders: in Focus (later Crime in Focus)	2021	2023	various	Adam Shand	LiSTNR	
Crime Interrupted	2022	2022	various	(not stated)	Casefile Presents	
Dad's Gone	2021	2021	Jorn Jensen	(not stated)	Podshape True Crime	
Dead Bodies	2018	2024	various	Dee Dee Dunleavy; Sharnelle Vella	(independent)	
Dead Wrong	2018	2018	Jeffrey Brooks	Kate Kyriacou; Peter Hall	The Courier-Mail	
Dear Rachelle	2025	2025	Michelle Childs	Ashlea Hansen	True Crime Australia	
Deep Fake	2024	2024	Arup deep fake scam	(not stated)	Podshape True Crime	
Diagnosing Murder	2025	2025	shaken baby syndrome	(not stated)	The Age; the Sydney Morning Herald	
Dig	2022	2022	Rat Pack	Veronica Milsom	ABC Podcasts	
Distinction	2020	2020	various	(not stated)	Victoria Police	
Dying Rose	2023	2023	Aboriginal deaths	Douglas Smith	Crime X; The Advertiser	
Eight Minutes	2018	2018	David Breckenridge	Nicole Hogan	The Daily Telegraph	
Everybody Knows	2021	2021	#MeToo in Australia	Ruby Jones	Schwartz Media	
Expanse	2023	present	various	Sinéad Mangan; Piia Wirsu; Alex Barwick; Danielle O'Neal; Erin Parke; Dominique Bayens	ABC	
Eye Spy	2021	2021	various	Natalie O'Brien	True Crime Australia	
Fairground Fuckups	2022; 2024	2024	Amusement park accidents	Andrew Menczel	Piccolo Podcasts	
Faith on Trial: Hillsong	2023	2023	Hillsong Church	Stephen Drill; Andrea Thiis-Evensen	Crime X	
Felon True Crime	2016–2018; 2020; 2024–	present	various	(not stated)	(independent)	
From the Files	2019	2020	various	(Casefile host)	Casefile Presents	
Frozen Lies	2019	2019	Derrance Stevenson; The Family	Debi Marshall	Foxtel	
Gate Crash	2018	2018	Nathan Garriock	Nicole Hogan	The Daily Telegraph	
Ghost Gate Road	2020	2020	Vincent O'Dempsey	Matthew Condon	Whooshkaa Studios	
Gone Girl: Abduction at the beach	2016	2016	Cheryl Grimmer	Mark Morri	The Daily Telegraph	
Grave Tales Australia	2018	2022	various	Chris Adams; Helen Goltz	(independent)	
Guardians of the Dead	2021	2021	various	Roger Byard	News Corp Australia	
Hannah's Story	2023	2023	Hannah Clarke	Melissa Downes; Jess Lodge	Tapt Podcasts	
Homicide: with Rod Iddles	2024	2024	various	Rod Iddles	Podcasting CJZ	
How I Survived	2018	2020	various	Beth Young	Pacific Podcast Network	
Hunting Justice (formerly The Mushroom Cook)	2024	present	Erin Patterson trial; Easey Street murders	Brooke Grebert-Craig; Laura Placella	Herald Sun / True Crime Australia	
I Catch Killers	2020	present	various	Gary Jubelin	True Crime Australia	
I Swear I Never	2019	2022	various	Nina Young; Bek Day	Kidspot	
In the Shadows	2023	2023	"Maria"	Raquel O'Brien	Casefile Presents	
Inside the NSW Police Force	2020	2023	various	Adam Shand	(independent)	
Inside the Tribe	2022	2023	12 Tribes	Tim Elliott; Camille Bianchi	Diamantina Media	
Investigates	2018	2020	various	Mary-Ann Harris	Pacific Podcast Network	
Julie's Gone	2025	2025	Julie Ann Garciacelay	Helen Thomas	Casefile Presents	
Just Lawful	2021	present	various	Daniel Panozzo; Sean Fewster	Nova Podcasts	
Just Married; The Anthea Bradshaw Mystery	2024	2024	Anthea Bradshaw	Ben Avery	Tapt Podcasts	
Killer Content	2020	2022	various	Emily Webb	Smart Fella	
Kiss & Kill	2026	present	intimate partner homicide	(not stated)	7News; LiSTNR	
Koala Crimes	2021	2021	various	Samantha Melanie	(independent)	
Lady Justice	2022	2022	female justice system workers	Natalie O'Brien; Amelia Saw	True Crime Australia	
Law: the Podcast	2026	present	various	Lex Lasry; Greg Barns	Bravecasting	
Liar Liar	2022	2022	Melissa Caddick	Kate McClymont; Tom Steinfort	The Sydney Morning Herald; The Age	
Life & Crimes	2017	present	various	Andrew Rule	True Crime Australia, Sunday Herald Sun	
Little Boy Lost	2017	2017	William Tyrell	Lia Harris	The Daily Telegraph	
Little Girl Lost	2017	2017	Leanne Holland	(not stated)	7 News	
Little Lost Girls	2020	2020	Joanne Ratcliffe; Kirste Gordon	Suzie Ratcliffe	Podshape True Crime	
Loose Ends	2021	2023	Singh family murders	Graeme Crowley	(independent)	
Loose Units	2018	present	various	Paul Verhoeven; John Verhoeven	Pillow Talk Productions	
Lost in Larrimah	2018	2018	Paddy Moriarty	Kylie Stevenson; Caroline Graham	The Australian	
Lost in Sydney	2018	2018	various	Jake McCallum	NewsLocal	
Matty	2022	2022	Matthew Leveson	Loren O'Keeffe	Casefile Presents	
Missing Niamh	2024	2024	Niamh Maye	(Casefile host)	Casefile Presents	
Missing or Murdered	2020; 2024	2024	Katie O'Shea	Jay Walkerden	Podshape	
Missing Pieces	2024	2024	Samantha Murphy	Jay Walkerden	Podshape	
Monster Trial	2019	2019	Ivan Milat	Janet Fife-Yeomans	The Daily Telegraph	
Monsters Who Murder	2018	present	various	Amanda Howard; Robert McKnight	Monsters Who Murder	
Moore to the Story	2025	2025	Kane Moore	Jay Walkerden	Podshape	
Mother's Guilt	2022	2023	Kathleen Folbigg	Jane Hansen	Crime X	
Motive & Method	2023	present	various	Xanthé Mallett; Tim Watson Munro	Tapt Podcasts	
Murder Archives	2018	2019	Norma Rhys McLeod	Emma Curtin	Nearly	
Murder Down Under	2017	2018	various	Benjamin Latter; Neah Dawn	(independent)	
Murder in the Land of Oz	2018	2020	various	Jessica Kate Ryan; Ellen-Rose Sorensen	That's Not Canon Productions	
Murderlaide	2019	2021	various	Ann	Murderlaide	
Mushroom Case Daily (see The Case of)	2024	2025	2023 Leongatha mushroom murders	Kristian Silva	ABC Listen	
My Dad and Son are Missing	2020	2021	Damien Dickie; Dylan Dickie	Jay Walkerden	Podshape True Crime	
My Father The Murderer	2018	2018	Allan Ladd	Nina Young	Whimn	
My Name is Cleo	2021	2022	Cleo Smith	Natalie Bonjolo; Kristin Shorten	The West Australian	
My Sister the Murderer	2024	2024	Brittney Dwyer	Ryan Dwyer	Podshape True Crime	
My Sister's Secrets	2022	2022	Alexandra Tapp	Virginia Tapscott; Steve Jackson	The Australian	
Naked City	2020	present	various	John Silvester	The Age	
Narelle Frazer Interviews	2020	present	various	Narelle Frazer	Acast	
Neighbourhood Watch	2021	2024	various	various	Western Australia Police; Neighbourhood Watch	
Nowhere Child	2019	2020	William Tyrell	Caroline Overington	The Australian	
On Guard	2020	2021	various	Ameila Saw	True Crime Australia	
On This Day In Crime	2020	2021	various	Emoji Luke	On This Day In Crime	
On Trial Australia	2026	present	various	Penelope Liersch; Erin Pearson	Tapt Podcasts	
One Minute Remaining	2022	present	various	Jack Laurence	The OMR Jury	
Our Little Edey	2023	present	Death of Eden Westbrook	Jacqui Lambie	Podshape	
Pendulum	2019	2020	Margaret Kirstenfeldt	Paula Doneman	7 News	
Person of Interest	2019	2019	Gaye Baker	Kate Kyriacou	The Courier Mail	
Persons of Interest	2024	2025	various	Sandra Di Girolamo	Western Australia Police Force	
Phoebe's Fall	2016; 2018	2018	Phoebe Handsjuk	Michael Bachelard; Richard Baker	The Age; The Sydney Morning Herald	
Poisoned?	2024	2025	poisoning of a child (Munchausen by proxy)	Jay Walkerden	Podshape	
Police Life: The Experts	2024	present	various	(not stated)	Victoria Police	
Police Tape	2019	2019	various	Merrick Watts	True Crime Australia	
Policing Australia	2021	present	various	Jason Byrnes	Australian Police Journal	
Prayed Upon	2023	2024	Religious cults	Kate Kyriacou	The Courier Mail	
Predator	2019	2019	Leonard Fraser	Michelle Gately	The Morning Bulletin	
Predatory	2023	2023	Child sexual abuse	Gary Jubelin; Madeleine West	True Crime Australia	
Problem Child (Note: Episodes 5–9 unavailable for downloading)	2019	2019	Keli Lane	(not stated)	Wicked Crime Podcast	
Pseudocide	2021	2022	Faked suicide	Alice Fiennes; Poppy Damon	Casefile Presents	
Pushed	2019	2021	"Annabelle"	Jack Morris	(not stated)	
Real Crime: Interview	2021	2022	various	Adam Shand	PodcastOne Australia	
Real Crime with Adam Shand	2025	present	various	Adam Shand	Podshape True Crime	
Reclaim Me	2021	2023	various	Madi	(independent)	
Ron Iddles: The Good Cop	2019	2019	various	Ron Iddles	Foxtel	
Ron Iddles: The Ricky Balcombe Murder	2018	2018	Ricky Balcombe	Greg Dundas	Geelong Advertiser	
Rotten Apple	2024	2024	Institutional abuse in Tasmania	Camille Bianchi; Amelia Saw	Tapt Podcasts	
SBS True Stories (series 3)	2016	2016	George Duncan; The Family Murders	Mark Whittaker	SBS	
Searching For Rachel Antonio	2016	2016	Rachel Antonio	David Murray	The Courier-Mail	
Searching For Sarah Macdiarmid	2021	2021	Sarah Macdiarmid	Vikki Petraitis	Casefile Presents	
Secrets of the Underworld	2021	present	various	Neil Cummins	Podshape	
Secrets We Keep	2024	present	various	Joey Watson; Richard Baker; Amelia Oberhardt	LiSTNR	
Shadow of Doubt	2023	2023	Child abuse	Richard Guiliatt	Crime X	
Shandee's Story	2021	2023	Shandee Blackburn	Hedley Thomas	The Australian	
She Matters	2025	present	domestic violence and femicide	Sherele Moody	Dashmade Productions	
Shot In The Dark	2023	2025	Gwen Grover	Alison Sandy	7News Podcasts	
Sick to Death	2025	2025	Jayant Patel	Hedley Thomas	The Australian	
Silent Waves	2018	2018	Raquel O'Brien	Raquel O'Brien	Nearly podcast network (2018); Casefile Presents (2021 re-release)	
So What Do You Think?	2021	2023	various	Jay; Bee	Anchor	
Sodeman: The Schoolgirl Strangler	2025	2025	Arnold Sodeman	Matt Dunn	chewlikebuggery productions	
Somebody's Daughter	2025	present	forced adption in Australia	Megan Norris; Moyra Major	(independent)	
South Australian True Crime	2021	2022	various	Mart Norton	Austees	
Spear Creek	2019	2019	Mount Isa Murders	Kate Kyriacou	The Courier-Mail	
Stalking Australia	2020	2021	various	Ann McMahon	That's Not Canon Productions	
Stalking Australia	2020	2021	various	Ann McMahon	That's Not Canon Productions	
Strewth	2025	present	various	Mark Shelton	(independent)	
Suburban Legends	2023	2024	various	Shaun McMahon	True Blue Media	
The Adam Shand Colllection	2026	present	various	Adam Shand	Podshape True Crime	
The Alibi	2015; 2019	2019	Denise Govendir; Eva Webel	Yoni Bashan; Claire Harvey	The Sunday Telegraph	
The Bakersfield Three	2023	2023	disappearance of 3 people	Olivia LaVoice	Casefile Presents	
The Boy in the Gold Mine	2025	2025	Terry Floyd	Dee Dee Dunleavy	Podcast Mike Media	
The Case Of (formerly The Mushroom Case Daily)	2025	present	various court trials	Stephen Stockwell; others	ABC News	
The Children in the Pictures	2022	2023	Task Force Argos	Akhim Dev	Disclosed	
The Clink	2020	present	various	Brent Simpson	Podshape	
The Confession	2022	2023	Katia Pyliotis	Richard Baker	The Age; The Sydney Morning Herald	
The Dead Can’t Sue	2026	present	various	Alecia Simmonds; Leigh Boucher	ABC Australia	
The Detective's Dilemma	2022	2022	Sian O'Callaghan	(Casefile host)	Casefile Presents	
The Devil's Apprentice	2023	2023	Jason Roberts	Anthony Dowsley	True Crime Australia; Crime X+	
The Disappearance of Des	2019	2021	Desmond Carr	(not stated)	Podshape	
The Dog Detective	2021	2021	Pet kidnapping	Andrea Thiis-Evensen	News Corp Australia	
The Easey Street Murders	2024	2024	Easey Street murders	Helen Thomas	Casefile Presents	
The Evidence Locker	2018	present	various	Noel Vinson	Evidence Locker True Crime	
The Frankston Murders	2023	2023	Frankston murders	Vikki Petraitis	Casefile Presents	
The Gangster's Ghost	2025	2025	Murder of Johnny Regan	Matthew Condon	The Australian	
The Glitch	2022; 2024	2024	Dan Saunders	Jay Walkerden	Podshape True Crime	
The Greatest Menace	2023	2023	Incarceration of homosexuals	Patrick Abboud	Audible Originals	
The Invisible Hand	2021	2021	Rhinoceros poaching in Southern Africa	Georgina Savage	Casefile Presents	
The Labyrinth	2021	2021	Janet Castrejon	(Casefile host)	Casefile Presents	
The Lady Vanishes	2019	2024	Marion Barter	Alison Sandy; Bryan Seymour	7 News	
The Last Outlaws	2021	2021	Jimmy Governor	Kaitlyn Sawrey	Impact Studios	
The Last Voyage of the Pong Su	2019	2019	Pong Su incident	Richard Baker	The Age; The Sydney Morning Herald	
The Lawyer, the Sniper and the NSW Police	2022	2022	Police work culture	Lina Nguyen; Mark Davidson	Gretchen Miller Media	
The Lighthouse	2019	2019	Theo Hayez	David Murray	The Australian	
The Lost Ones	2022	2022	various	Amber Wilson	True Crime Australia	
The Mafia's Web	2021	2021	Operation Ironside	Stephen Drill; Todd Hunter	True Crime Australia	
The Man Behind the Rose	2023	2023	Gordon Nuttall	Patrick Condren	7NEWS Podcasts	
The Missing Australia	2019; 2023	2025	various	Meni Caroutas	Podular	
The Missing Campers Trial (see On Trial Australia)	2024	2025	Russell Hill; Carol Clay	Penelope Liersch; Erin Pearson	9 Podcasts	
The Missing Matter	2025	present	Marion Barter	Sally Leydon; Joni Condos	Podshape	
The Mushroom Case Daily (see the Case Of)	2024	2025	Erin Patterson trial	Stephen Stockwell; Kristian Silva; Rachael Brown	ABC News	
The Mushroom Cook (see Hunting Justice)	2024	2025	Erin Patterson trial	Brooke Grebert-Craig; Laura Placella	Herald Sun / True Crime Australia	
The Mushroom Trial: Say Grace (see On Trial Australia)	2025	2025	Erin Patterson trial	Penelope Liersch; Erin Pearson	9Podcasts	
The Night Driver	2020	2020	Janine Vaughan	Hedley Thomas	The Australian	
The Nurse	2020–2021; 2023	2024	James Griffin	Camille Bianchi	Tapt Podcasts	
The Poisoned Wife	2026	present	1986 strychnine murder	Hedley Thomas	The Australian	
The Rock Star & The Nanny	2019	2020	Penny Hill	Mary-Ann Harris	Pacific Podcast Network	
The Saints	2025	2025	Elizabeth Struhs	Pippa Bradshaw	Tapt Podcasts	
The Stick Up	2022	2024	various	Russell Manser	(independent)	
The Sting	2022	2023	Australian mafia	Colin McLaren	Podshape True Crime	
The Sydney Siege	2021	2021	Lindt Cafe siege	Jay Walkerden	Podshape True Crime	
The Teacher's Pet	2018	2018	Lynette Dawson	Hedley Thomas	The Australian	
The Teacher's Trial	2022	2023	Chris Dawson	Hedley Thomas; David Murray; Matthew Condon; Claire Harvey	The Australian	
The Trap	2021	2021	Domestic abuse	Jess Hill	(independent)	
The Ultimate Sacrifice	2024; 2025	2025	Wieambilla shootings	Melissa Downes	Tapt Podcasts	
The Unthinkable	2024	2025	various	Vikki Petraitis; Emily Webb	Casefile Presents	
The Vanishing of Vivian Cameron	2020	2020	Vivian Cameron	Vikki Petraitis	Casefile Presents	
The Zest is History (later All Aussie Hour)	2020	2022	various	Josie Rozenberg-Clarke; Melissa Mason	The Zest is History	
Their Name Is	2022	2025	Rhianna Barreau; various	(not stated)	Ezra Magazine	
Thin Black Line	2020	2020	Death of Daniel Yock	Allan Clarke	ABC Radio National	
Trace	2017–2018; 2020–2022	2024	Maria James; Nicola Gobbo	Rachael Brown	ABC News	
Trial by Water	2024	2024	Robert Farquharson	Michael Bachelard	The Age; The Sydney Morning Herald	
Troubled Waters	2024	2024	Louisa Ioannidis	Julia Robson	Casefile Presents	
True Blue	2019	2021	various	Shaun McMahon; Chloe Williams	True Blue Media	
True Crime Cheat Sheet	2023	2023	various	Bek Day; Nina Young	True Crime Australia	
True Crime Conversations	2019	present	various	Jessie Stephens	MamaM!a	
True Crime Down Under (Note: Currently unavailable for downloading)	2018	2019	various	Bronnie Sprick; Loraine House	(independent)	
True Crime Island	2016	2023	various	"Cambo"	True Crime Island	
True Crime Sisters	2017	2019	various	"Harry"; "Bill"	True Crime Sisters Podcast	
True Crime Story Time	2017	2019	various	Casey; Samantha	True Crime Story Time	
The Truth About Addiction	2022-2024; 2025–	present	various	Ron Isherwood	(independent)	
The Truth About Amy	2024	2025	Amy Wensley	Ron Iddles	7NEWS Podcasts	
Twisted Minds	2021	2022	various	Amelia Saw	True Crime Australia	
UnderState: In Plain Sight	2019	2019	Jonathan Dick	Adam Shand	PodcastOne Australia	
UnderState: Lucille Butterworth	2018	2018	Lucille Butterworth	Adam Shand	PodcastOne Australia	
Unfiltered	2023	2024	various	Raquel O'Brien	Casefile Presents	
Unravel True Crime	2018	2021	Mark Haines; Trudie Adams; Belinda Peisley; Lezlie Manukian; Juanita Nielsen; Mr. Big	Allan Clarke; Ruby Jones; Gina McKeon; Ollie Wards; Keiran McGee; Alicia Bridges	ABC	
Unspeakable: Understanding sexual crime	2017	2017	Sexual offence reporting	(not stated)	Victoria Police	
Violent Times	2019	2019	various	Mahmood Fazal	VICE Australia	
WA Police Confidential	2026	present	various	Claire Ciantar, Mya Grieve, Nate Gilmour	Western Australia Police Force	
Wanted	2023	2023	various	Jack Laurence	Mashed Pumpkin Productions	
Warlord	2016	2016	Farhad Qaumi; Brothers for Life	Claire Harvey; Yoni Bashan	The Sunday Telegraph	
What Happened to…	2026	present	various	Sally Leydon	Podshape True Crime	
What happened to Zac?	2019	2019	Zac Barnes	Jay Walkerden	Podshape	
What's Missing	2020	2020	Missing persons	Loren O'Keeffe	Casefile Presents	
Where's William Tyrell?	2019	2020	William Tyrell	Lia Harris; Natarsha Belling	TenSpeaks	
Where is Bruce Schuler?	2023	present	Bruce Schuler	Graeme Crowley	Graeme Crowley Podcast Investigations	
Who Killed Bob?	2021	2023	Bob Chappell	Eve Ash; Colin McLaren	Podshape True Crime	
Who Killed Dr Bogle & Mrs Chandler?	2022	2022	Bogle–Chandler case	Peter Butt	Blackwattle Films	
Who Killed Leanne Holland?	2020	2020	Leanne Holland	Jamie Pultz	Six10 Media Group	
Who Killed Sarah Brown?	2024	present	Sarah Brown	Graeme Crowley	Graeme Crowley Podcast Investigations	
Who The Hell Is Hamish?	2019	2019	Hamish McLaren	Greg Bearup	The Australian	
Who's to Blame?	2024	2024	Emma Lovell	Lee Lovell	Podshape True Crime	
Witness	2024	present	Alan Metcalfe; William Tyrrell; OnlyFans; Leslie Ball	Alex Turner-Cohen; Dan Box; James Weir; Jo Townsend & Callum Denness	News Corp Australia	
World's Dumbest Criminals	2021	2023	various	Tara Sariban	(independent)	
Wrong Skin	2018	2019	Julie Buck; Richard Milgin	Richard Baker	The Age; The Sydney Morning Herald	
Yendumu: The Trial	2022	2022	Zachary Rolfe	Kristin Shorten; Matt Cunningham	The Australian	

== See also ==
- List of Australian podcasts
- List of American crime podcasts
