= Wanted (2013 TV program) =

- Genre: News; Criminal investigation
- Presented by: Sandra Sully; Matt Doran
- Composer: Mads Dollabill
- Country of origin: Australia
- Original language: English
- No. of seasons: 1
- No. of episodes: 10

Production
- Producer: Cordell Jigsaw Zapruder
- Production location: Pyrmont, New South Wales
- Running time: 60 minutes

Original release
- Network: Network Ten
- Release: 8 July – 26 September 2013

Related
- Australia's Most Wanted

Wanted is an Australian crime television program. Its first episode went to air on Network Ten on 8 July 2013 at 8:30PM. Wanted was presented and produced from the Network Ten's Sydney studios in Pyrmont. The show was telecast nationally. Because of Australia's multiple time zones, Wanted was aired live on the East Coast. In South Australia, the Northern Territory and Western Australia, the show aired on a time delay of 30 minutes and 2 hours respectively.

== Format ==
Wanted is a criminal investigation show which helps federal and state police directly to solve cold cases, homicides, disappearances and petty theft cases such as burglaries and vandalism.

Wanted is a socially interactive show which employs a broad range of social media to encourage the public to help solve crimes, with viewers being encouraged to provide immediate information anonymously that could prove an arrest or a lead to close the case.

== Presenters ==
Wanted is presented by news presenters Sandra Sully and Matt Doran, and by a team of crime specialists including:

- Dr Xanthe Mallett
- Neil Mercer
- Terry Dalton

=== Dr Xanthé Mallett ===
Forensic anthropologist and criminologist Xanthé Mallett investigates cold cases and finds new evidence to the cases. In 2010, Mallett made a series in the UK called History Cold Case for BBC2/National Geographic, with a team from the Centre for Anatomy & Human Identification at the University of Dundee. History Cold Case saw skeletons of everyday people from across the ages analysed in staggering detail, opening new windows on the history of our forebears. A second series was broadcast in June 2011.

Mallett also presented a piece about Jack the Ripper called National Treasures for the BBC in 2011. The live magazine-style format show put science at the heart of programming for the BBC's main entertainment channel.

=== Neil Mercer ===
Investigative crime reporter Neil Mercer goes into the field and interviews the victims' families for the main feature story. When he isn't available, Doran or Sully presents the story. Mercer has been a journalist for more than 40 years, working in newspapers and television. He has covered crime since 1981 when he reported on the shooting of criminal Warren Lanfranchi by NSW Detective Sergeant Roger Rogerson.

=== Terry Dalton ===
Former Detective Superintendent Terry Dalton brings an experience from over 30 years in the field with NSW Police. Dalton mostly presents the Petty Theft cases and brings with it a slight comedic twist to the show. Dalton once said in a case of a string of burglaries on a Sydney University that "these crooks are studying how to become a criminal... And they're failing at it" because the criminals were in full view of the security cameras.

Dalton is a recipient of the National Medal and 1st Clasp to the medal. He is also the recipient of the NSW Police Medal and 3rd Clasp to that medal. He was awarded the Centenary Medal in 2001 for service to policing in the community. Dalton was awarded the Australian Police Medal for distinguished service in the 2010 Queen's Birthday Honours List.

He is a Major in the Royal Australian Corps of Military Police (Reserves), currently attached to ADFIS. He has received the Reserve Forces Medal, Defence Medal and National Service Medal for military service. He has served in the Army Reserve since 1978 and was previously in the Citizens Military Forces.

=== Other reporters ===
Only a few reporters have appeared on Wanted, such as Nick Way who covers the stories in Western Australia, appearing on more than half of the ten episodes.

== Series 1 ==
Series 1 was first aired at 8:30PM on 8 July 2013. Wanted had a specially designed set in the Ten News studios in Sydney. Series 1 has aided State and Federal police in the arrests of 16 fugitives, including a missing teen girl, some of whom were on the Australia's Most Wanted List of the Australian Federal Police. Wanted struggled ratings wise, not reaching a million viewers on the debut episode reaching just 649,000 viewers, by 22 July 2013 it reached only 618,000 viewers. By the end of July 2013, it was shown that Wanted struggled in the Australian television ratings.

== Series 2 ==
On the final episode of Series 1 on 26 September 2013, it was announced by Doran and Sully that the program would return in 2014; however, this did not eventuate.

== Reception ==
In a 2013 review, Gordon Farrer of The Sydney Morning Herald noted that "Crime dramas, detective novels and real-life crime shows such as Wanted reinforce the feeling that we are right to feel nervous and should be ever-vigilant - no matter that crime levels are lower than ever. Host Sandra Sully is perfect as the meerkat lookout in Wanted, her ground-beef voice swells with gravitas and the suggestion of approaching threat that insists we look at the danger."
