= Disappearance of Julie Garciacelay =

Unsolved Australian disappearance case

- Date: 1 July 1975
- Location: Canning Street, North Melbourne, Victoria
- Perpetrator: Unknown

1 Canning Street, Melbourne - 20:00/22:30 Last sightings of Julie at her and sister Gayle's apartment

Julia Anna Garciacelay (born 1955) was an American woman aged 19, who went missing on 1 July 1975 from her home in North Melbourne, Victoria, Australia. Her disappearance has been ruled a homicide. The cold case dates back to just 18 months before the Easey Street killings in nearby Collingwood.

== Background ==
Garciacelay was born and raised in Stockton, California, United States of America. She was the second of three daughters to Ruth and Fermin Garciacelay. On 10 October 1974 Garciacelay was granted an Australian Entry Visa and was subsequently granted permanent residency in Australia. On 4 November 1974, Garciacelay entered Australia. Garciacelay lived with her sister, Gayle, in her apartment located at Canning Street, North Melbourne. Julie Garciacelay worked in several short-term hospitality jobs before commencing work as a library reference clerk at Southdown Press on Latrobe Street, Melbourne.

== Disappearance ==
After arriving home from work, Julie told Gayle that Rhys "Tom" Collins had attended her workplace during the day and had asked to come around to the apartment some time that evening. A staff member at Southdown Press recalled that John Grant, an employee of Southdown Press, came to the library in the workplace with two men, one with the surname "Collins", seeking information or articles on soul food. Grant and Collins talked to Garciacelay about their idea to open a soul food restaurant and the group made arrangements to meet at Julie and Gayle's apartment that evening to discuss the business venture.

Gayle had made plans to visit her friend Barbara Somerton at her apartment in Kew to watch her colour television. Gayle was not feeling well, and asked Julie to call her work before 11.00pm to advise that she would not be attending work. It is presumed that Gayle was still working for an American company at the time. Gayle left the apartment at approximately 8.00pm after talking to two door-to-door kitchenware salesmen for approximately 45 minutes. At the time she left the apartment, Julie was alone and waiting for Collins to attend.

On 2 July 1975 at approximately 1.00pm, Gayle returned home in the company of her friend Barbara Somerton and her husband Francis. Julie was not home and the apartment looked untidy. The Somertons left the flat with Gayle to go to lunch at the local Toorak Hotel. In the afternoon sometime between 3.40pm and 4.00pm, Gayle returned to the apartment with the Somertons. Julie was still not home, and Gayle became concerned for her welfare. Barbara Somerton went to call the Southdown Press to confirm whether Julie Garciacelay had attended work. An employee of Southdown Press confirmed she had not been to work.

Gayle found a blood-soaked towel and other items, including Julie's underwear, strewn around the flat. Julie's glasses, contact lenses, house keys and medication were all located inside the flat.

== Investigation and statements ==
Immediately after Garciacelay was reported as a missing person to Victoria Police, they commenced an investigation. In the course of this investigation, police formed a suspicion that Garciacelay was deceased; and the death was considered to be a homicide. Despite this investigation, no person or persons have been charged with indictable offences in connection with her death.

Extensive proof of life checks were conducted including telephone, bank, Medicare and Centrelink enquiries. However, none of these enquiries revealed the location or whereabouts of Garciacelay.

Police later found blood on the landing and personal items at the flat, including keys and a wallet. They also found a handwritten note with a phone number on it, which the men told police was the number she had gone out to ring. A kitchen knife and a black cape were missing.

=== Collin's statement ===
On 11 July 1975 Collins provided an unsigned statement in relation to the disappearance of Garciacelay. Collins stated that he, John Grant and John Power had attended Garciacelay's apartment on the evening of 1 July 1975, bringing a dozen bottles of beer with them. Collins stated that the group stayed at Julie's apartment talking, drinking and playing records. At an unknown time, Grant and Power went out to get food, whilst Collins remained with Garciacelay. The two men returned a short time later with pizza. At approximately 10.30pm, Garciacelay left the apartment to make a telephone call for her sister, and Collins stated he stayed at the apartment with Grant and Power. Garciacelay did not return, and the three men left the apartment, with Collins being dropped home at approximately 11.00pm.

=== Grant's statement ===
Grant provided an unsigned and undated statement regarding Garciacelay's disappearance. Grant's statement confirmed that he attended her apartment with Collins and Power, and that the three men had left after Garciacelay did not return from going to make a telephone call.

On 30 October 2003, Grant attended the Victoria Police Homicide Squad office on St Kilda Road, Melbourne to be interviewed regarding the disappearance and suspected murder of Garciacelay. Grant gave a "no comment" interview, and did not consent to provide a blood sample upon request.

=== Power's statement ===
John Power was not interviewed by police until 31 October 2003. He was interviewed at Port Phillip Prison regarding Garciacelay's disappearance. Power confirmed that on 1 July 1975 he had attended her apartment on the night of 1 July 1975 in the company of two other men he refused to name. He also confirmed that he left the apartment to get pizza and returned afterward. He also stated that the three men had left the apartment when Garciacelay had gone out to make a telephone call and subsequently did not return. Power agreed to provide a blood sample upon request.

== Coronial inquest ==
A Coronial Inquest into Julie Garciacelay's disappearance was held on 11 April 2018 at the Coroners Court of Victoria by Judge Sara Hinchey. The result of the inquest found that despite no body being located, Ms Julie Ann Garciacelay is deceased.
