= Disappearance and death of Marion Barter =

Australian disappearance case

Marion Barter
- Born: Marion Wilson; 3 October 1945
- Disappeared: 22 June 1997 (aged 51); Southport, Queensland, Australia
- Status: Missing for 29 years, 4 months and 29 days
- Died: circa 15 October 1997
- Other name: Florabella Natalia Marion Remakel
- Occupation: Teacher
- Height: 168 cm (5 ft 6 in)
- Spouses: Johnny Warren (m. 1967–1969) Stuart Brown (m. 1977–1979) Ray Barter (m. 1985–1990)
- Partner: Ric Blum
- Children: Sally Leydon (née Brown) (b. 1973); Owen Brown (1974–2002)
- Website: themissingmatter.com/marions-story

Marion Barter (born 3 October 1945) was an Australian missing person, teacher, and mother of two, who disappeared on Sunday 22 June 1997 from Southport, Queensland. She was dropped off at a bus stop in Southport to go to the airport for a planned long-term vacation in England and has not been seen since.

For years, police maintained that Barter's disappearance was voluntary, although their attempts to locate her were unsuccessful. But in 2019, after extensive international media coverage and new legal proceedings lodged by her daughter, Sally Leydon, her case was taken over by the Unsolved Homicide Squad in Sydney and authorities are now handling it as an active homicide investigation.

Barter's case was featured in the Australian crime podcast The Lady Vanishes, a Seven News production and one of "Apple's Best Listens of 2019". Her case also garnered significant speculation on internet message boards and forums, with theories ranging from identity theft to mental illness, to witness protection, and murder.

On 29 February 2024 the New South Wales (NSW) State Coroner announced that Barter is deceased, however there is insufficient evidence to declare a place, cause or manner of her death. It declared her date of death as sometime after 15 October 1997.

== Background ==
Marion Wilson was born in 1945 to Jack Wilson and Colleen Wilson. She had three sisters. In 1967, she married professional football player Johnny Warren. They divorced in 1969. Her daughter Sally was born in 1973, followed by a son Owen born in 1974. She married their father, Stuart Brown, in 1977. They divorced in 1979, and in 1985 she married Ray Barter. They divorced in 1990.

In 1994, Barter purchased a home for A$180,000 (equivalent to about $369,000 in 2022) in Merinda Court in Southport and began work as a teacher at The Southport School, where she was awarded the Queensland Teaching Excellence Award in 1996 by Ita Buttrose. On 25 April 1997, Barter sold her home in a quick sale for A$165,000 (equivalent to about $314,000 in 2022).

On 15 May 1997 she changed her name via deed poll to Florabella Natalia Marion Remakel and obtained a passport under her new name. However, she continued to use her previous name at work and in correspondence with family and friends, and never mentioned her name change to anyone.

One month later, on 20 June 1997, Barter resigned from work, citing in her resignation letter her desire to travel and find a new job teaching in England. The letter also made a request to renew her teacher's certification for the next school year. On 22 June 1997, she left Australia for a year-long vacation in England with plans to travel throughout the United Kingdom and mainland Europe. While on vacation, Barter sent family, friends and former students postcards, letters and gifts from locations around England postmarked Tunbridge Wells in Kent, Sussex, and London.

She also called her daughter, Sally Leydon, in late July and early August. They spoke for the last time on the evening of 1 August 1997. Barter mentioned that she was extending her stay in Tunbridge Wells and decided to reschedule her upcoming reservation to ride the Orient Express. This was the last time she was ever heard from.

== Early investigations ==
Barter's children became concerned in October 1997, after months of not hearing from her, when she failed to call her son to wish him a happy birthday. Leydon called the Commonwealth Bank telebanking line on 21 October, where Barter did her banking, to check for activity on the account, discovering it had been emptied of more than A$80,000 (equivalent to about $152,000 in 2022) in daily increments of $5,000 between August and September from branches in Byron Bay, NSW and in Burleigh Heads and Ashmore, Queensland. She also discovered, through a friend at customs that on the morning of 2 August 1997, less than a day after speaking to Leydon from Tunbridge Wells in England, her passport returned to Australia via Brisbane.

Leydon immediately travelled to Byron Bay and filed a police report with this information. Despite never physically sighting Barter, police told Leydon that she was alive and did not want to be contacted. They marked the report as "an occurrence" as opposed to an investigation of a missing person. Unhappy with these findings, Barter's father decided to ask the Salvation Army Missing Persons Bureau for help in locating his daughter, convinced that her decision to leave was out of character for her.

In March 1999, Jack Wilson received a suspicious letter from The Salvation Army claiming that a Missing Persons police officer spoke to a security officer at Colonial State Bank who said that Barter 'spoke of starting a new life,' and, in 1990 (not 1997), withdrew the balance of her account in Ashmore. The inconsistencies and errors in the letter made Leydon concerned that the inquiries were not taken seriously. Many years later, the SA apologised and admitted that they never physically sighted Barter nor can they confirm if she truly made the statements in the letter.

Barter did not contact her family when Leydon got married in 1998 at The Southport School Chapel, nor in 2001 when her first granddaughter was born, or in 2003 when her son died by suicide and her father died after a long illness.

== Subsequent investigations ==
In 2007, Sally Leydon contacted the Australian Federal Police (AFP) missing persons unit asking for information on the ten-year anniversary of her mother's disappearance. The AFP looked into the case and planned to use the case as the face of their annual "Missing Persons Week" campaign, hoping the public exposure might help bring in new information. But the NSW Police Force barred the use of her story in the campaign, citing the need to protect the investigation despite the fact that Leydon was told that there was no on-going investigation.

Beginning in 2009, the new cold case detective in Byron Bay uncovered some significant findings. Shortly before leaving Australia, Barter had changed her name on 15 May 1997 to Florabella Natalia Marion Remakel, and obtained a new passport in that name. She returned to Brisbane Airport on 2 August 1997, having spoken to Sally Leydon by phone the day before, and on the return-flight customs card she claimed she was married, living in Luxembourg as a housewife, and staying in Australia for only three days. On 13 August 1997, her medicare card was used in Grafton under her old name. After this date her passport never left the country and her medicare card was never used again. It was confirmed that police have not seen or spoken to her since 1997 and cannot locate her.

In 2010, the lead detective looked into a 2002 Crime Stoppers tip in which a man claimed a missing woman named Barter had been murdered and buried in bushland near the University of New England in Armidale, NSW. The detective investigated the tip alone, bringing a cadaver dog to his aid, for two days. The search was unsuccessful.

In 2011, the Byron Bay missing persons unit removed Barter from the NSW state missing persons register. In 2013, Leydon was contacted by a stranger named Clark Hunter via a private Facebook message that stated: "Natalia is alive but you (sic) never see her again. It was not her intention to disappear. She was forced." Leydon forwarded a screenshot of the message to the police, but the tip was never investigated by them.

In May 2019, the NSW Missing Persons Unit disbanded and a new unit was formed. AFP Homicide Review unit reopened the case and decided to put Barter on the National Missing Persons register for the first time in 23 years. In June 2021, NSW police and local government announced a A$250,000 (equivalent to about $266,000 in 2022) reward for information leading to the discovery of what happened to Barter. This was increased on 26 April 2022 to A$500,000. On 4 May 2026, the reward was further increased to A$1,000,000.

== Inquest ==
In August 2020, the NSW State Coroner announced its decision to hold an inquest into Barter's disappearance and suspected death. The inquest allows the court to compel witnesses to testify, to disclose all police records concerning her disappearance, and to gather information from other police agencies and organisations in Australia and other countries she may have visited or lived in.

The inquest began in June 2021, before Coroner Teresa O'Sullivan with ten days of evidence from police officers and members of Barter's family. The inquest then sat for another ten days in February 2022 and three days in April 2022 to hear the evidence of a man called Ric Blum who says he had two brief affairs with Barter, first in the 1960s then again in 1997 very shortly before she disappeared, making him one of the last people to see her. The inquest also heard from former Queensland police officers working at the Missing Persons Bureau, staff of the Commonwealth Bank, Ric Blum's wife of 45 years, and two other women with whom Blum had extra-marital relationships in the 1990s. The inquest sat for one further day in October 2022 to hear the evidence of a Byron Bay bank employee who says they remembered serving Marion Barter in 1997.

The 2022 sessions were streamed on the Coroner's Court of NSW's YouTube channel. The coroner was scheduled to hand down her verdict by 30 November 2022, but on 29 November it was announced that the findings had been vacated. A statement from Courts Media quoted by The Lady Vanishes podcast in a special announcement said "There is no future date at this stage and it is postponed following further investigations."

The Coroner considered another three days of hearings from 31 May 2023, and later announced that she would deliver her findings on 28 February 2024 in Lidcombe.

== Coroner's findings ==
On 29 February 2024 the NSW State Coroner, Teresa O'Sullivan, announced that she has declared Marion Barter deceased. She established Barter's death as sometime after 15 October 1997, the day she was said to have made a final in person withdrawal from her bank account. However the cause, place, and manner of her death could not be determined.

The Coroner also announced that Ric Blum, Barter's former lover, "does indeed know more", but did not recommend charges against him. O'Sullivan recommended the NSW police commissioner ensure that the investigation of Barter's disappearance is referred to or remains within the state crime command's unsolved homicide team for further investigation.

== Media ==
Seven News began a crime podcast series called The Lady Vanishes in April 2019. It covered the investigation into Barter's disappearance in real time. It was hosted by award-winning freedom of information editor Alison Sandy and investigative reporter Bryan Seymour, with Sally Leydon's participation. The series has been downloaded over 10 million times. Guests on the show included Scotland Yard criminal behaviour analyst and founder of Paladin, Laura Richards; retired homicide detective senior sergeant Ron Iddles; and Ita Buttrose, an Australian businesswoman and chairperson of the Australian Broadcasting Corporation, who had presented Barter with an award.

A book titled The Lady vanishes by Alison Sandy, Bryan Seymour, Sally Eeles, and Marc Wright was published in 2024.

Marion Barter's daughter Sally Leydon launched her own podcast and website The Missing Matter in May 2025. Initially providing insights and updates about her mother's case, the podcast later expanded to cover other cases of missing people.

== See also ==
- List of people who disappeared mysteriously: 1910–1990
