= Disappearance of Maureen Braddy and Allan Whyte =

1968 missing persons case in Australia

Locations
1 Vinton Street, California Gully, Bendigo, Australia.

The disappearance of Maureen Braddy and Allan Whyte occurred on 23 November, 1968, after 16-year-old Maureen Joyce Braddy and 17-year-old Allan George Whyte from Bendigo, Victoria (Australia) attended a YMCA dance, which they were last seen leaving. It is assumed that they were on their way to Braddy's house on Vinton street in California Gully. The main suspect in the disappearance was Maureen's father, Stanley Braddy, however evidence was insufficient for an arrest. On 23 January, 2017, a $1 million reward was offered in return for information leading to the arrest and conviction of those responsible for the crime.

== Background ==
=== Maureen Braddy ===
Maureen Joyce Braddy was born on 24 August 1952, and was the third out of the ten children born to Stanley and Kathleen (Muriel) Braddy. She had attended Eaglehawk high-school until she left in 1968, and on 9 April that year she became a full-time employee in the Crystal Egg Company as an egg packer. Maureen was described as quiet, shy, loyal, reliable, responsible and obedient, she lacked any adventurous streak, was not street-wise and had a small circle of friends.

Maureen's father, Stanley, was described as strict, domineering and abusive toward his wife and children, in some cases beating them with a three-foot-long toasting fork, a willow branch or a water-soaked leather strap. As a result the Braddy children avoided discussing personal issues and being involved in each other's lives "as a way of surviving". Despite Stanley Braddy's attempts to present a happy family, neighbors testified that there was a great deal of friction in the Braddy home, and swearing, shouting and crying could be heard regularly from the premises. Maureen reportedly did not get along with Stanley and did not want to be around him, and was described by one of her neighbors as strong-willed and capable as well as one who would stand up to her father.

=== Allan Whyte ===
Alan George Whyte ("Sammy") was born on 12 March 1951 to Robert and Lilian Whyte, and was one of 14 children, four to Robert Whyte and ten to Robert Bullock. Alan had attended White Hills Junior Technical School, but only for a short period, and he could not read or write. Allan began work at the Crystal Egg Company on 4 November 1968, a mere three weeks before his disappearance. He was described as family orientated, shy and quiet, and like Maureen, had few friends. Alan's family was described by his siblings as rather close-knit, however, according to his sister "the family just accepted that Allan had gone missing and left enquiries up to the police".

Alan and Maureen knew each other from their place of employment and were friends, there are conflicting testimonies whether they were in a relationship, there is no evidence suggesting that they were sexually involved or that they had intended to run away together. However, according to the Herald Sun, a number of Maureen's siblings believed that the two had been murdered after Maureen had told a relative that she was pregnant.

== Disappearance ==
On 22 November 1968, one day before the disappearance, Maureen's close friend and Neighbor, Judith Todd, noticed that Maureen had a large bruise ("the size of a ball") between her elbow and shoulder, but Maureen refused to talk about it.

On the afternoon of 23 November, Maureen was observed by her friend Jillian Yates, who noticed that Maureen had been crying, the reason for which was not disclosed. However when Allan arrived on the scene her mood was noticeably lifted and she reassured Yates, that "as Allan was there, she would be alright". That evening Whyte joined Braddy at her family home, and despite an initial intention that he stay for dinner, the two of them left for a dance at the YMCA hall. At the dance Maureen and Allan did not display any signs of distress or anything untoward and did not give any indication that they were planning on running away. Between eight and nine pm Allan and Maureen left the dance and spoke briefly with Allan's 20-year-old brother Kevin Whyte, who invited them to come to his apartment nearby for a party he was hosting that night. Allan declined and stated that he was taking Maureen home. That was the last time the two were ever seen.

According to Maureen's brother Robert, when he had noticed the next morning that Maureen's bed had had not been slept in, he told his parents and "it sort of came across that they couldn't have cared. They didn't jump out of bed and go and look or anything like that."

Stanley Braddy's behavior after the disappearance raised suspicion, as he went to work the next day and did not report it, he rarely spoke about Maureen afterwards, changing the subject whenever she came up in conversation, even years later, and would refuse to discuss the matter.

On 24 November, Maureen was reported missing to Bendigo police, not by her parents, but by her married sister Rhonda, who during a visit to the family home had heard that she had not returned the night before. Alan had not been reported missing until 9 October 1969, eleven months after the disappearance, however according to his sister Cheryl, his mother had gone to make the report in the afternoon of 24 November 1968, but had possibly been dissuaded from doing so.

== Investigation ==
Initially, many witnesses, and the police force itself, believed Alan and Maureen had been in a relationship and had run away, delaying any adequate investigation of the disappearance until the 1990s, with further investigations being commissioned in the early 2000s, culminating in a Coronial inquest submitted in 2014, and media coverage into the 2020s.

In a testimony given by Maureen's sister Suzanne, the latter had come home at 2am and noticed that Maureen's bed had not been slept in, but her handbag, which Maureen took with her every time she went out, was on a bedside dresser, indicating that she had returned after the dance. Additionally, Susanne had noticed that her own shoes had specks of fresh blood on them, after she had entered through the back door.

Between 9-10pm Maureen's friend and neighbor, Judith Paynting, had been watching television with her mother when she reportedly heard what sounded like two gunshots, 3-5 minutes apart, with screaming in-between them, coming from the Braddy residence, and a car leaving 15-20 minutes later. The police were not called. The reports of the bangs and the screaming were corroborated by similar testimonies of Maureen's sisters Jennifer, Debra and Lynette. Lynette also stated, in an account partially recovered through hypnosis, that she looked out the window to see what the commotion was about and saw her father and his friend Ted Beasley coming around a camellia bush behind the house holding "a young person", who she believed to be Allan, covered in blood. Portions of her account were confirmed by the testimonies of her sisters.

Geoffrey, Maureen's brother, recalled seeing his mother watering the camelia bush at night in an unusual fashion, though he could not recall whether this occurred the night of the disappearance or up to 2-3 weeks later or earlier. The next morning he noticed that the bush was "unusually clean", though he did see a spot of blood on one of the leaves.

The coronial inquest, completed in 2014, concluded that the disappearance was a result of foul play, and that the couple had most probably died the very night they disappeared.

In 2019, a photo, believed to have been taken in Geelong boarding house in 1968, showing two individuals resembling Braddy and Whyte surfaced and was released by police, in the hope that it would confirm that the two had run away together. The back of the photo contained writing which said "Neil and Kaye. Kaye is asleep on her feet, Neil is supporting her with his elbow". Though the pictured couple allegedly told the photographer that their names were Neil and Kaye, police explored the possibility that they were only pseudonyms. Scientific analysis of the photograph proved inconclusive.

== Theories ==
=== Statement of Kathleen Braddy ===
In the statement Maureen's mother, Kathleen Braddy, gave to police, she claimed that a single phone conversation she had with Maureen had taken place four weeks after the disappearance. According to this statement, Maureen said she wanted to come home, and in the background a male voice was heard, saying "What are you doing?" when the call ended abruptly. Kathleen Braddy also claimed that she had seen Maureen in the Nagambie/Stanhope area and at the family home several times, however these claims were investigated by police and were found to be unsubstantiated. Rhonda, Maureen's sister stated that her mother's state of mind had been affected by the disappearance, causing her to see and hear things confirming that Maureen was still alive, and that she was still looking for her 12 years after the disappearance. Kathleen Braddy was diagnosed with dementia a short time after the investigation.

=== Statement of Stanley Braddy ===
Stanley Braddy, Maureen's father, initially alleged that foul play was involved, but later changed his mind and claimed that he and his son Stanley Junior had seen Maureen in Nagambie. This was contradicted by the statement given by Stanley Junior and by his widow, Leslie Braddy. On 8 June 2012, in a recorded conversation between Det. Sgt. Birch, Det. Sgt. Murphy and Stanley Braddy, Braddy presented a narrative according to which Maureen and Allen were abducted, held against their will, became happy with their circumstances and eventually had children with their expenses paid by the government. According to Braddy, the target was Allan Whyte "because someone wanted a son somewhere" and "Maureen was an added attraction". This narrative was dismissed as "Wholly incredible" by Birch.

=== Local Belief ===
Many witnesses expressed their belief that Maureen and Allan had been killed and placed in a well on Vinton Street. This was not based on any hard evidence, though it matches a testimony given by Suzzanne Braddy who saw her father "doing something" with the concrete cover of the well, while there were two rolls of carpet next to him. When she went outside to investigate she saw that he had pulled something over the well and she could not see into it. Three months later Stuart Diss, Suzzanne's boyfriend at the time, looked down the well and saw rusted bed frames and "bits and pieces", but not any carpets. A number of years later Stanley Braddy built an extension over the well which at the time of the 2014 report was the lounge room of one of the homes on Vinton Street. The well was never investigated by police as it would have been too costly, even though the owner of the residence at the time, Garry Donnelly, stated that if the coroner had recommended it, he would have been open to the police investigating the well.

The bodies may also have been disposed of in one of the many mineshafts in the area, though there is no evidence to suggest it.

== Suspects ==
Stanley Braddy, Maureen's father remains the prime suspect, though he maintained his innocence and consistently denied that he had any knowledge of, or involvement in, the disappearance. However, his testimonies contradicted multiple statements given by other family members and even some of his own. His violent nature and strange behavior after the disappearance compounded the suspicions about him.

== Reward ==
On 23 January, 2017, a $1 million reward was offered in return for information which would lead to the arrest and conviction of those responsible for the kidnapping and murder of Maureen Braddy and Allan Whyte. The reward was to be paid at the discretion of the Chief Commissioner.

== See also ==
- Disappearance of Trudie Adams
- Disappearance of Rachel Antonio
