= Easey Street murders =

1977 murder of two women in Collingwood, Australia

Coordinates: 37°47′53.35″S 144°59′19.64″E

Susan Bartlett (left) and Suzanne Armstrong (right)

The Easey Street murders refer to the knife murders of Suzanne Armstrong and Susan Bartlett in Collingwood, Victoria, Australia, an inner suburb of Melbourne, in January 1977. Described as "Victoria’s most brutal crime", the case remained unsolved despite a A$1 million reward being posted in 2017.

On 19 September 2024 a 65-year-old man, Perikilis "Perry" Kouroumblis, was arrested in Rome, Italy, in connection with the murders. He was extradited to Australia and arrived in Melbourne on 3 December 2024.

Kouroumblis returned to court on 29 October 2025 for a committal hearing over six days, where the evidence of 19 witnesses was tested in court.

== Background ==
Suzanne Armstrong (28), a single mother who had a child while staying in Naxos, Greece, and Susan Bartlett (27), a schoolteacher at the Collingwood Education Centre, were old high-school friends from Benalla, regional Victoria, who had moved to Melbourne. They had rented the property at 147 Easey Street in October 1976, ten weeks prior to the killings. Their terrace house consisted of a long corridor with three bedrooms, leading to a rear kitchen, bathroom, and backyard area, sided by a laneway.

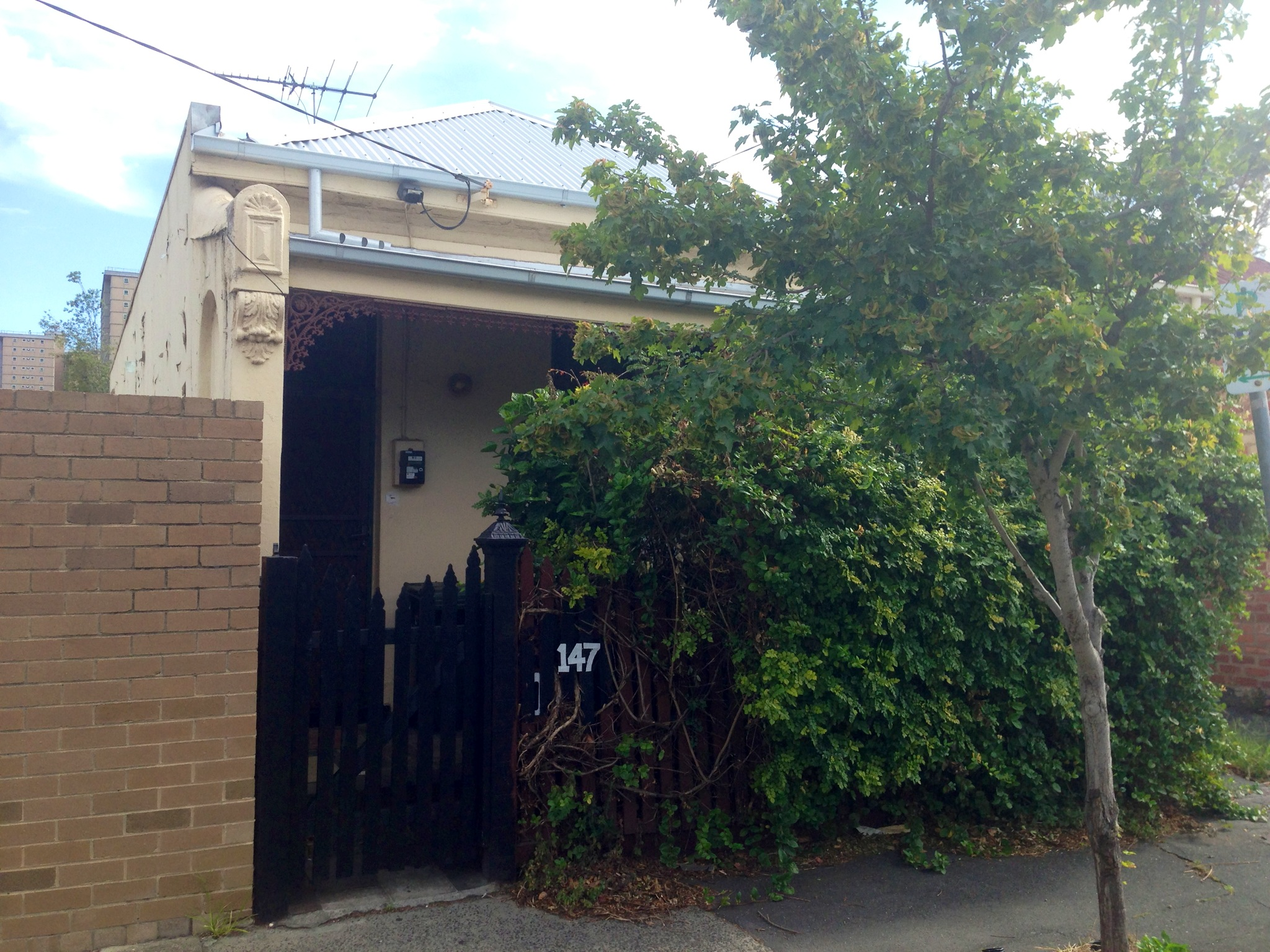
A 2013 photo of the house at 147 Easey Street.

On 10 January 1977, Bartlett's brother and his girlfriend visited for dinner before watching television and leaving around 9:00 pm. Police believe that Armstrong and Bartlett were both killed later that same night.

Neighbours first noted a problem when they retrieved a puppy belonging to the two, which had been wandering the area the next day. The next-door neighbours had noticed the back door open and had also heard Armstrong's 16-month-old son, Gregory, distressed in the days after the attack. Finally, three days after the women were killed, on 13 January, the neighbours entered via the back door; Gregory was found unharmed, but distressed and dehydrated in his cot. One of the women's bodies was also discovered near the front of the house.

== Investigation ==
When the police arrived, Armstrong was found on the floor of her bedroom, at the very front of the house, having been stabbed 27 times and sexually assaulted at some time after her death. Bartlett was found face down near the front door, just outside Armstrong’s bedroom, with 55 stab wounds, and showed signs of self-defence and attempts to escape. The bathtub and towels near the back of the house showed evidence that the perpetrator had attempted to clean up before leaving via the back door.

There were no signs of forced entry – though a footprint on the front window sill indicated a possible entry point. The kitchen light was left on and a murder weapon was not found. A note from Armstrong's boyfriend, who had visited the property with his brother after the murders took place, was also found on the kitchen table. Another note pinned to the front door, regarding the lost puppy, was also there.

Victoria Police eventually established a list of 130 'persons of interest' related to the case. The list included construction workers who were in the process of building at 365 Hoddle Street, the property behind the house. Media also reported that the women had been sexually assaulted as well. Armstrong had been raped postmortem and a semen sample was found at the scene. In 1999 detectives DNA tested the case's eight prime suspects, one of whom had returned to the UK, without success.

The murders were later linked to the disappearance and murder of Julie Garciacelay, a librarian originally from Stockton, California. Garciacelay had disappeared from her North Melbourne, Victoria apartment on 1 July 1975. One suspect in that case, a crime reporter and work friend of Garciacelay at Truth, had been staying in the house next to the Easey Street killings on the night of the attacks.

However, despite investigations by a team of sixteen detectives, the case quickly went cold and the murders remained unsolved. A year after the attacks, a reward of $50,000 was offered. In 2011, however, the case was quietly re-opened under the supervision of the detective Ron Iddles. On 15 January 2017 forty years after the murders, police offered a reward of up to $1 million for information leading to the apprehension and subsequent conviction of the person or persons responsible for the attacks.

=== Arrest ===
On 19 September 2024, Perry Kouroumblis, a 65-year-old man, holding dual citizenship of Australia and Greece, was arrested at an airport in Rome, Italy, in connection with the murders. Kouroumblis had been a student at the same school where victim Susan Bartlett worked as an arts and crafts teacher. His arrest was executed under an Interpol red notice, after which Kouroumblis was remanded in custody in Italy. Authorities from Victoria Police and the Australian Attorney General's office sought his extradition to Australia, where Victoria Police intend to charge him with two counts of murder and one count of rape. At the time of the offences, he was 17 years old.

Police revealed that Kouroumblis had been a suspect since at least 2017, when he had been asked to submit a DNA sample along with other suspects; he emigrated to Greece prior to providing any DNA to police. Owing to Greek residence and their statute of limitations on the initiation of an arrest warrant for murder charges, authorities were unable to seek his arrest while he remained there. Consequently, police were obliged to wait for him to travel outside the country. His arrest in Rome marked the first opportunity for such an action.

On 25 September, days after his arrest, Kouroumblis appeared in front of a court in Rome. He subsequently indicated that he would not fight the extradition request, telling the court he was innocent of the murders and intended to clear his name. Kouroumblis was extradited and arrived in Melbourne late on 3 December. His committal hearing commenced on 29 October.

At a hearing on 4 December 2024, Kouroumblis was represented by criminal defence lawyer Bill Doogue.

== Legacy ==
Gregory Armstrong was adopted and raised in Queensland by his mother's younger sister, who has also continually advocated for the solving of the case in the media. Interest in the case has persisted, particularly when the property was sold (after remaining vacant for six years) in 1983, then in 2011, and again in 2017.

Australian artist Steve Cox lived in Easey Street, diagonally opposite to the murder house, between 1978 and 1979. He later made a number of artworks based on this case.

A book by Tom Prior, They trusted men: The untold story of the Easey Street murders, was published in 1996. In March 2019 a book by Helen Thomas called Murder on Easey Street: Melbourne's Most Notorious Cold Case (ISBN 978-1760640040) was published. Thomas was interviewed by True Crime Conversations about the case in November 2019.

In June 2018, journalist Andrew Rule released a podcast on the case called The horror at Easey St. Rule also interviewed Thomas in a March 2019 follow up podcast. In April–May 2019, Unsolved Murders: True Crime Stories ran a 2-part dramatised episode on the case. In April 2022, Casefile featured the case in episode 207. In January 2024, a 6-part podcast covering the case by Casefile Presents was also released.

== See also ==
- List of unsolved murders (1900–1979)
