= Hayez =

Hayez is a French-language surname related to the word haie 'hedge'. Notable people with the surname include:

- Francesco Hayez (1791–1882), Italian painter
- Théo Hayez (born 2001), Belgian man missing since 2019
