= California Gully =

- Suburb
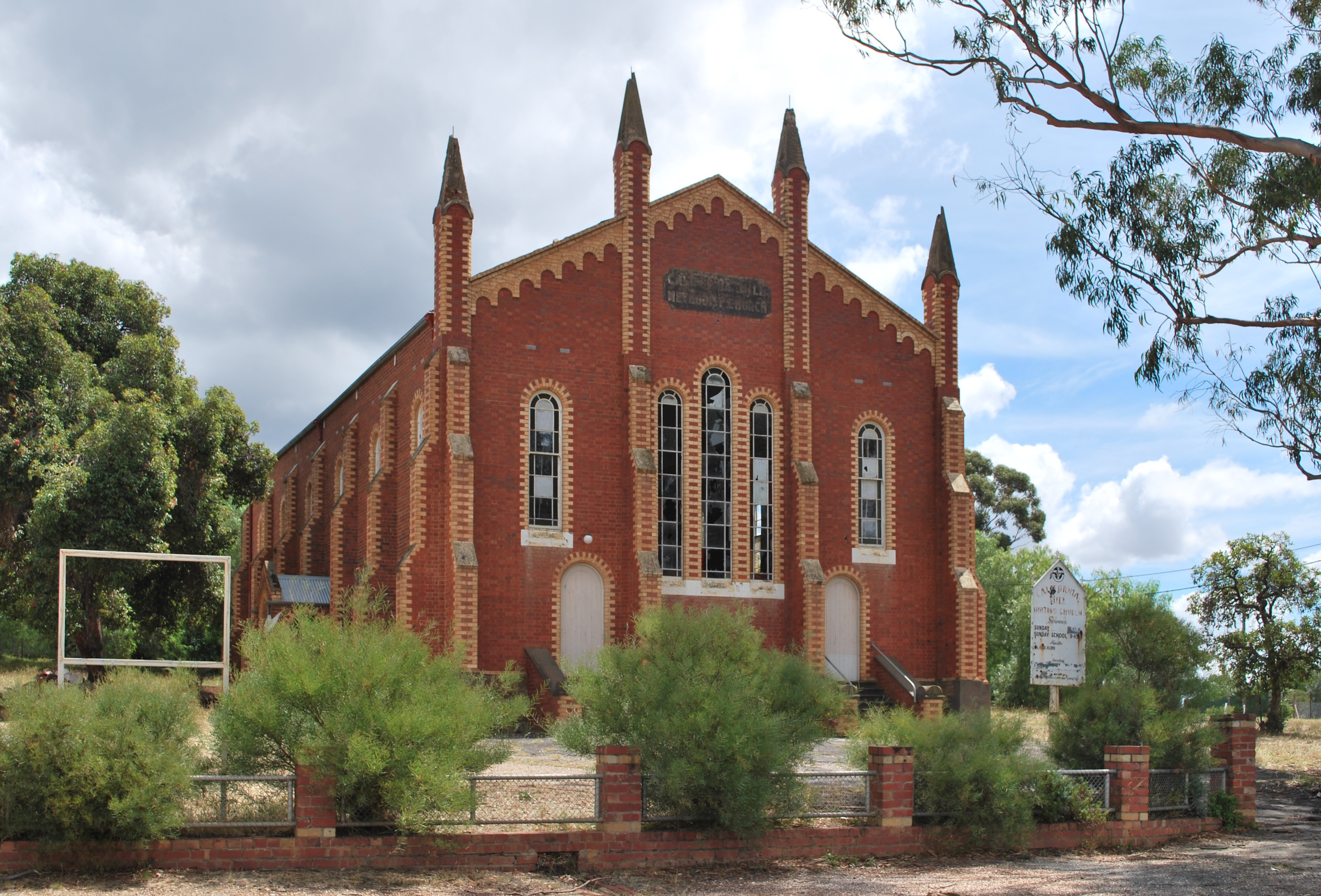
- The Uniting Church, formerly St Jude's Anglican Church, was built circa 1868.

- Interactive map of California Gully
- Coordinates: 36°44′S 144°16′E
- Country: Australia
- State: Victoria
- City: Bendigo
- LGA: City of Greater Bendigo
- Location: 5 km (3.1 mi) NW of Bendigo

Government
  - State electorate: Bendigo East, Bendigo West
  - Federal division: Bendigo

Population
  - Total: 4,476 (2021 census)
- Postcode: 3556

California Gully is a suburb of Bendigo, Victoria, Australia. The suburb is located 5 kilometres (3.1 mi) north-west of the Bendigo city centre along Eaglehawk Road. At the 2021 census, California Gully had a population of 4,476.

The suburb is named for the Californian miners who rushed to the area when gold was discovered in 1852.

== Schools ==
In 1862, the California Gully School was built. It operated until 1883, when the Belltopper Hill School (No. 123) was opened. The Belltopper Hill school continues to operate as the California Gully Primary School.

== Notable residents ==
- Agnes Jessie Bennett, community worker in Kalgoorlie, was born here in 1880.
- Archibald Edmund "Archie" Robertson, born 1884, served in World War I as a lieutenant. In 1921, he died from a fall from his bicycle. A memorial seat was erected in his honour in 1923.
- Maureen Braddy and Alan Whyte, two teenagers who mysteriously disappeared in 1968 after a YMCA dance, were both residents of Bendigo. In 2019, a $1 million reward was offered in return for information which would lead to solving the case.
