= Xanthé Mallett =

Scottish anthropologist (born 1976)

- Born: Xanthé Danielle Mallett; 17 December 1976 (age 49); Helensburgh, Scotland
- Education: Sheffield PhD, 2007; Cambridge MA, 2003; Bradford BA, 2002
- Occupations: Forensic anthropologist, criminologist, TV presenter
- Notable work: Mothers Who Murder, History Cold Case, Coast Australia

Xanthé Danielle Mallett (/ˈzænθi/; born 17 December 1976) is a Scottish forensic anthropologist, criminologist, and television presenter. She specialises in human craniofacial biometrics and hand identification, and behaviour patterns of paedophiles, particularly online. She is an associate professor at the University of Newcastle in Newcastle, New South Wales, Australia.

== Biography ==
Mallett was born in Helensburgh, Scotland, and grew up in Bedfordshire, England. Her father was an engineer and her mother a former dancer. Mallet herself was a dancer, and from age 9 attended the Arts Educational School in Tring, Hertfordshire. She was also active in other sports, such as tennis, and planned to take a degree in physical education. However, a car accident severely damaged her knee and required 10 surgeries.

She received her bachelor's degree in archaeological sciences from the University of Bradford, a master's degree in biological anthropology at the University of Cambridge, and her doctorate in forensic science from the University of Sheffield.

For five years, she worked at the Centre for Anatomy & Human Identification (CAHID) at the University of Dundee, Scotland, where she was a forensic practitioner and a lecturer of forensic anthropology. Mallet stated that her interest in criminology began to increase, which led her to move to Australia in 2012. "My casework experience helped me to realise that I was becoming more interested in investigating the behaviours behind the crimes, rather than identifying the victims and offenders from physical evidence they leave behind," she said. She was a senior lecturer at the University of New England in Armidale, New South Wales, before taking the same role at the University of Newcastle in Newcastle, New South Wales.

Mallett has been published in various academic journals including the International Journal of Legal Medicine and the Journal of Forensic Sciences. In 2014, she published the book Mothers Who Murder: And Infamous Miscarriages of Justice about mothers who kill their own children.

== Media career ==
Mallett worked as a forensic anthropologist on the BBC2 series History Cold Case from 2010 to 2011. The series involved Mallett and other experts working to find cause of death for human remains dating from Roman times to Victorian England. She also starred in the U.S. version of the series, which aired on the National Geographic Channel as The Decrypters.

In Australia, Mallett presented the series Wanted in 2013 and is a co-host of Coast Australia. In 2014, she presented a television special, Mothers Who Murder, on Channel Ten that coincided with the release of her book. In the special, she met with families and police to investigate what led to the murders. One of the women she profiled was Rachel Pfitzner, who killed her 2-year-old son, Dean Shillingsworth, in 2007.

Since March 2023, she has co-hosted the crime podcast Motive & Method with forensic psychologist Tim Watson Munro.

== Bibliography ==
- Mallett, Xanthé (2020). Reasonable doubt. Pan Macmillan Australia. ISBN 9781760784843.
- Mallett, Xanthé (2019). Cold Case Investigations. Pan Macmillan Australia. ISBN 9781760784836.
- Mallett, Xanthé; Blythe, Teri; Berry, Rachel (2014). Advances in Forensic Human Identification. Amazon. ASIN B00HZNQISS.
- Mallett, Xanthé (2014). Mothers Who Murder. Random House Australia. ASIN B00IY5QK8O.
- Patrick S. Randolph-Quinney; Xanthé Mallett; Sue M. Black (2009). "Forensic Anthropology". In Jamieson, Allan; Moenssens, Andre A (eds.). Wiley Encyclopaedia of Forensic Sciences. Chichester, West Sussex: Wiley. ISBN 9780470018262.
