= Ryedale Windypits =

Natural underground features in North Yorkshire, England

- Site of Special Scientific Interest
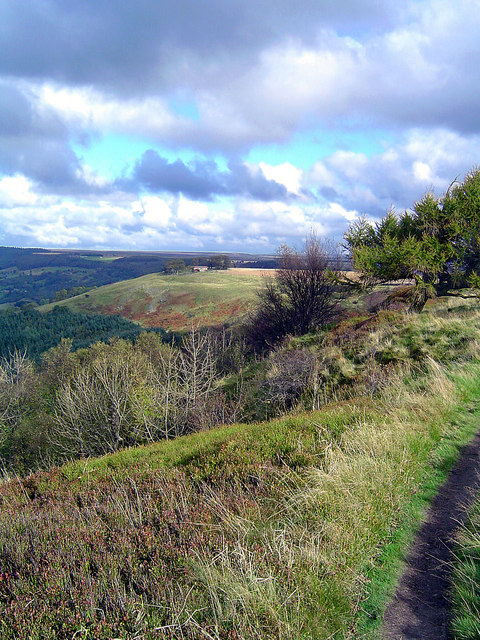
- Image taken from Hillfort windypit

- Location within North Yorkshire
- Location of Ryedale Windypits.
- Area of search: North Yorkshire
- Grid reference: SE 585829
- Coordinates: 54.238909°N 1.103146°W
- Interest: Geological and biological
- Area: 27.74 acres (0.1123 km^{2}; 0.04334 sq mi)
- Notification date: 1960

The Ryedale Windypits are archaeologically significant natural underground features within the North York Moors National Park. This series of fissures in the Hambleton Hills, near Helmsley, is located on the Western slope above the River Rye.

== Description ==
Their name is a local one, derived from their tendency to emit gusts of air and steam from their narrow entrances. The phenomenon is caused by warm or cold air rising from the fissures and coming into contact with the air outside the entrance. In winter a steamy vapour rises in puffs or jets from the holes. In warmer months cold air can be felt in the passage entrances, sometimes moving so violently as to vibrate the foliage nearby. There are more than 40 known windypits, but only four windypits have known significant archaeological deposits. These are Antofts, Ashberry, Bucklands and Slip Gill. Due to their geological significance, several of the windypits are designated as SSSIs.

The windypits are used as an amenity for cavers and potholers, and are also nationally important swarming and roosting sites for bats. Seven species of bat have been recorded including whiskered Myotis mystacinus, Daubenton's M. daubentoni, Natterer's M. nattereri and brown long-eared Plecotus auritus. All of the Ryedale Windypits are located in or on the edge of woodland or forestry plantation.

== Exploration ==
The first recorded exploration of a Windypit was by Rev. William Buckland in 1832, and subsequently these caves were explored and partially excavated during the mid-20th century. The human remains from the four Windypits are Late Neolithic or Early Bronze Age burials due to their association with the Beaker pottery and flint tools found in the chambers of the fissures.

== Archaeology ==
In 2011, the BBC's History Cold Case programme featured a team from the Centre of Anatomy and Human Identification at the University of Dundee investigating the site. Their investigation focused on particular on a tangle of 2,000-year-old bones, possibly those of a family, found in Slip Gill Windy Pit in the 1950s. A forensic examination of the bones, revealed evidence that at least one of them had been scalped. Further investigations by the team looked at bones found in neighbouring pits. Those too showed signs of blunt force trauma, confirming inter-personal violence as well as a shin bone which had markings that were consistent with the removal of flesh from bone.
