= Agnes Jessie Bennett =

Australian nurse and community worker

Agnes Jessie (Addie) Bennett
- Born: 22 February 1880; California Gully
- Died: 25 July 1969 (aged 89); Kalgoorlie

Agnes Jessie (Addie) Bennett (1880 – 1969) was an Australian nurse and community worker.

== Life ==
Bennett was born in Victoria State in the Bendigo suburb of California Gully in 1880. Both of her parents had been born in the UK. She was about ten when her father, George Dixon, died of tuberculosis and she became the manager of his mine. The family's finances were wrecked as the mines profits were deposited with a local bank and it ceased trading. Agnes was the fourth child in the family and she had to care for her mother, her siblings and attend school. At some point, she learned how to play the piano. Her mother, Jessie (born Watson), died in 1902, like her husband. as the result of tuberculosis.

Bennett became a piano teacher in Kalgoorlie in 1906. She had moved there where she had a sister who was married. After about 18 months she married a cordial manufacturer named Thomas Henry Bennett from Adelaide. He worked for R.Mackay Co Ltd until 1932 when he died after a fall at the works where he was the foreman.

In 1940 she formed and then became the commandant of a Voluntary Aid Detachment. She already had a base in Hannan Street where Kalgoorlie Municipal Council permitted her to deliver training and to be an air-raid dressing station. She led this VAD until 1943 when she stood down. She gave her major effort then to being the Lady superintendent of the St John's Ambulance division.

In 1946 Lady Louis Mountbatten visited. Mountbatten had a senior position within the British St John's Ambulance. Bennett and her division made up part of her guard of honour. Two years later Bennett began an association with No 2 company of the Girl Guides of Western Australia. In 1950 a new sub-centre opened in Kalgoorlie and a room there was named for her.

In 1960 she was already a serving sister in the Order of St John and that year she became an officer sister.

Bennett died in 1969 in Kalgoorlie and she was buried locally.
