= Caroline Wilkinson =

British anthropologist

Caroline Wilkinson FRSE FRAI
- Born: 27 October 1965 (age 60)

Academic background
- Education: University of Manchester

Academic work
- Discipline: Anthropology
- Sub-discipline: Forensic facial reconstruction; craniofacial identification; forensic art
- Institutions: University of Manchester; University of Dundee; Liverpool John Moores University

Caroline M. Wilkinson FRSE FRAI (born 27 October 1965) is a British anthropologist and academic, who specialises in forensic facial reconstruction. She has been a professor at the Liverpool John Moores University's School of Art and Design since 2014. She is best known for her work in forensic facial reconstruction and has been a contributor to many television programmes on the subject, as well as the creator of reconstructed heads of kings Richard III of England in 2013 and Robert the Bruce of Scotland in 2016.

== Academic career ==
Wilkinson holds a Doctor of Philosophy (PhD) degree in facial anthropology from the University of Manchester (2000), and from 2000 to 2005 led the Unit of Art and Medicine at the university. Between 2005 and 2014 she taught at the University of Dundee in the award-winning Centre for Anatomy and Human Identification, where from 2011 she was Professor of Craniofacial Identification and Head of Human Identification.

She first became known to television audiences as a result of her regular appearances on the BBC series Meet the Ancestors, and also appeared on History Cold Case while working at the University of Dundee (2005 – 2014).

=== Facial reconstruction ===
In 2013, Wilkinson created a facial reconstruction of King Richard III, whose remains had been uncovered in a car park and positively identified using DNA.

In December that year, Wilkinson created a facial reconstruction of Saint Nicholas, working from anatomical knowledge, tissue depth data, and the latest reconstruction technology. From his skeletal remains, it was known that his broken nose had "healed asymmetrically, giving him a characteristic nose and rugged facial appearance".

In 2016, Wilkinson helped create facial reconstructions of Robert the Bruce, using a skull believed to have belonged to the Scottish king. Two versions were created, one standard one and another based on the belief that he had suffered from leprosy.

She is the author of several works on the subject of facial identification and depiction.

== Awards ==
In 2012, she was elected a Fellow of the Royal Society of Edinburgh and was awarded the 2013 RSE Senior Prize for Public Engagement. In 2014, she was elected a Fellow of the Royal Anthropological Institute (FRAI).

Wilkinson was awarded the Combined Royal Colleges medal of the Royal Photographic Society in 2016, for "outstanding contribution to the advancement of medical photography or medical imaging."

== Works ==
- "Juvenile forensic facial reconstruction – a detailed accuracy study" (with Whittaker, DK). Proceedings of the 10th Meeting of the International Association of Craniofacial Identification, Bari, Italy; 98-110 (2002)
- "Measurement of eyeball protrusion and its application in facial reconstruction." (with Mautner, SA.) J For Sci 48 (1) 12-16 (2003)
- "The reconstruction of faces showing healed wounds."(with Neave, RAH) J Archaeological Science 30; 1343-1348 (2003)
- "The relationship between the soft tissues and the skeletal detail of the mouth." (with Motwani, M and Chiang, E.) J For Sci. 48 (4) 1-5 (2003)
- "In vivo facial tissue depth measurements for White British children". J. Forensic Sci 47 (3): 459-465
- Forensic Facial Reconstruction (Cambridge University Press, 2008) ISBN 0-521-09012-1
- "Craniofacial Identification" (Cambridge University Press, 2012) Co-editor. ISBN 978-0-521-76862-7
