= Tim Watson-Munro =

Australian criminal psychologist

- Born: 1952 or 1953 (age 73–74)
- Education: M.A (Psychology)
- Alma mater: University of Sydney
- Years active: 1978–present
- Children: 5

Tim Watson-Munro (born 1953) is an Australian criminal psychologist. His expertise has been used in some of Australia's biggest criminal trials. He has analysed some of Australia's most prolific and violent criminals, including underworld figure Alphonse Gangitano and mass murderer Julian Knight. His work involves determining whether those charged with acts of extreme violence are legally insane. Watson-Munro is regularly called upon to provide expert evidence in court and in the media.

== Early life ==
Born 1953, Watson-Munro has described being raised in a "privileged academic environment". His father was a professor of physics, and his mother was a scientist. He was initially educated at Sydney Grammar School, where he left to work in a lumber yard. Watson-Munro later returned to a different school to complete his secondary education. He then went on to study psychology at the University of Sydney.

== Career ==
Watson-Munro is described by The Herald Sun as one of Australia's leading and distinguished criminal psychologists. In 1978, he began his career at Paramatta Jail. He then went into private practice. He has assessed over 30,000 people in his career, including 200 murderers. Watson-Munro's primary role when assessing criminals is to determine whether they are legally insane. Three notable individuals Watson-Munro has worked with included Julian Knight, Alphonse Gangitano, and Mr Cruel. "Mr Cruel" is a pseudonym for the never-identified suspect of several child rapes and the murder of Karmein Chan in Melbourne during the late 1980s and early 1990s. Watson-Munro was contracted by Victoria Police during their investigation to profile the potential offender.

Watson-Munro was the psychologist responsible for assessing and working with Julian Knight after he carried out the 1987 Hoddle Street massacre, killing seven people and leaving 19 injured. Watson-Munro states that the marksmanship during the massacre suggested clear thinking on the part of Knight.

Watson-Munro was assigned to treat deceased Melbourne underworld figure Alphonse Gangitano shortly after his arrest for allegedly murdering petty criminal Gregory Workman. Gangitano was released after the prosecution dropped all charges relating to the arrest after a key witness left the country. Watson-Munro expected Gangitano not to pursue treatment. However, shortly after his release, Gangitano contacted him for an appointment, and treatment continued. Watson-Munro has written that Gangitano had a degree of "intellectual prowess", and that his time with Gangitano demonstrated to him that even career criminals can have "other lives that are seemingly quite normal".

More recently, with the rise in popularity of crime podcasting, he has been increasingly invited as a guest on numerous shows. Since March 2023, he has co-hosted the Motive & Method podcast with criminologist Xanthé Mallett.

== Views ==
Watson-Munro is an advocate of educating and informing victims of crime about their rights to compensation and treatment.

Watson-Munro in 1996 voiced concerns that the child welfare system in Victoria was in "chaos and on the brink of collapse". He noted truancy and crime being committed by children in the care of the state and called for a royal commission into the government department responsible. Watson-Munro was involved in assessing a 14-year-old boy who, while wandering around at night, murdered a taxi driver.

Watson-Munro has criticised a proposal to ban songs with suicidal themes as "censorship gone mad". He considers such proposals well intentioned, but that real issues of youth suicide in Australia need addressing, such as socio-economic circumstances.

Watson-Munro has stated that individuals who consume true crime media and are socially isolated, mentally ill, or young can become desensitised to violence and gore. He stated "I think there is a nexus between that and people viewing this material and becoming desensitised to it or wanting to see what it is like".

== Controversy ==
In 1999, Watson-Munro pleaded guilty to using and possessing cocaine. He was fined A$1,000 and placed on a 12 month good behaviour bond, a non-custodial sentence of good behaviour. In June 2000, the Board refused his re-registration as a psychologist. In 2002, the Board again found it not in the public interest to allow Watson-Munro to practice. Watson-Munro has described the years preventing him from running a clinical practice as "the greatest challenge [he] ever faced". In 2003, Watson-Munro regained registration as a psychologist, on the basis he undertook supervision for a period of two years.

== Personal life ==
Watson-Munro's first wife Susan died of cancer. He is now married to his second wife, Carla. He is the father of five children.

== Works ==
- Watson-Munro, Tim (2017). Dancing with Demons. Sydney: Pan Macmillan Australia. ISBN 9781760552664.
- Watson-Munro, Tim (2018). Shrink in the Clink. Melbourne: Pan Macmillan Australia. ISBN 9781760782009.
