= John Silvester (writer) =

Australian journalist and crime writer

- Writing career
- Genre: Crime
- Notable awards: Walkley Award

John Silvester is an Australian journalist and crime writer. He has written for major Melbourne based newspapers such as The Age, the Herald Sun and others. Silvester has also co-written a number of bestselling books with Andrew Rule, based on crime in Melbourne. Some of their works formed the basis of the hit Australian TV series Underbelly. He also appears weekly on 3AW's breakfast program as "Sly of the Underworld".

== Career ==
Silvester received a Bachelor of Arts in politics and legal studies at La Trobe University in 1978, according to an article in the university's Alumni newsletter, Agora, which also stated that his father, Fred Silvester, was a former Victoria Police Assistant Commissioner, and head of the Australian Bureau of Criminal Intelligence. In 2007, Silvester won the Graham Perkin Australian Journalist of the Year for his work covering crime and corruption.

According to his profile at The Age:

John Silvester has been a crime reporter in Melbourne since 1979, moving to The Age in 1993. He has worked with The Sunday Times insight team in London, won an ASEAN-AJA scholarship to study crime and corruption in South East Asia and has given evidence at Royal Commissions on police corruption. Silvester has published more than 30 crime books that have sold more than one million copies. He has won three Walkley awards, six Victorian Press Club Quills, a Ned Kelly award for true crime writing, a Ned Kelly lifetime achievement award and nine Victorian Law awards. He has been judged the Graham Perkin Australian Journalist of the Year and has twice been commended in the same award. He appears regularly on radio station 3AW to discuss crime matters.

He has contributed to several ABC crime documentaries including Terry Carlyon's 2015 two-part documentary on police shootings – Trigger Point. Silvester writes "the Naked City", an award-winning weekly crime column in The Saturday Age. John hosts a true crime podcast, The Naked City.

== Personal life ==
Silvester is also a passionate supporter of the Hawthorn Football Club. He once fought a draw with former world champion Barry Michael in a charity boxing match.

== Bibliography ==
- Inside Victoria: A Chronicle of Scandal, Bob Bottom with John Silvester, Tom Noble & Paul Daley ISBN 0-3302726-1-6 (1991)
- The Silent War: Behind the Police Killings That Shook Australia, John Silvester, Andrew Rule & Owen Davies ISBN 0-6462506-4-7 (1995)
- Underbelly: True Crime Stories, John Silvester & Andrew Rule ISBN 0-646-33924-9 (1997)
- Underbelly 2: More True Crime Stories, John Silvester & Andrew Rule ISBN 0-9586071-1-7 (1998)
- Underbelly 3: Some More True Crime Stories, John Silvester & Andrew Rule ISBN 0-9586071-3-3 (1999)
- Underbelly 4: More True Crime Stories, John Silvester & Andrew Rule ISBN 0-9586071-6-8 (2000)
- Underbelly 5: More True Crime Stories, John Silvester & Andrew Rule ISBN 0-9586071-8-4 (2001)
- Underbelly 6: True Crime Stories, John Silvester & Andrew Rule ISBN 0-9579121-3-7 (2002)
- Tough: 101 Australian Gangsters: A Crime Companion, John Silvester & Andrew Rule ISBN 0-9579121-2-9 (2002)
- Underbelly 7: More True Crime Stories, John Silvester & Andrew Rule ISBN 0-9579121-6-1 (2003)
- Underbelly 8: More True Crime Stories, John Silvester & Andrew Rule ISBN 0-9752318-2-0 (2004)
- Leadbelly: Inside Australia's Underworld Wars, John Silvester & Andrew Rule ISBN 0-9752318-0-4 (2004)
- Underbelly 9: More True Crime Stories, John Silvester & Andrew Rule ISBN 0-9752318-7-1 (2005)
- Gotcha: How Australia's Baddest Crooks Copped Their Right Whack, John Silvester & Andrew Rule ISBN 0-9752318-5-5 (2005)
- Underbelly 10: More True Crime Stories, John Silvester & Andrew Rule ISBN 0-9775440-3-6 (2006)
- Rats: Crooks Who Got Away With It: Tails of True Crime and Mystery from the Underbelly Archives, John Silvester & Andrew Rule ISBN 0-9775440-0-1 (2006)
- Underbelly 11: True Crime Stories, John Silvester & Andrew Rule ISBN 0-9775440-5-2 (2007)
- Underbelly: The Gangland War, John Silvester & Andrew Rule ISBN 978-0-9775440-6-6 (2008)
- Underbelly: A Tale of Two Cities, John Silvester & Andrew Rule ISBN 978-0-9775440-9-7 (2009)
- Underbelly: The Golden Mile, John Silvester & Andrew Rule ISBN 978-0-9806971-0-0 (2010)
- Underbelly: The Golden Casket, John Silvester & Andrew Rule ISBN 978-0-9807170-3-7 (2010)
- Underbelly: Mokbelly, John Silvester & Andrew Rule ISBN 978-0-9807170-5-1 (2013)
- Underbelly: Where the Bodies Are Buried, John Silvester & Andrew Rule ISBN 978-0-9807170-6-8 (2015)
- Underbelly: Shot at Close Range, John Silvester & Andrew Rule ISBN 978-0-9807170-7-5 (2016)
