= Massimo Sica =

Australian murderer

Massimo 'Max' Sica is a convicted triple murderer, having been found guilty of killing his former girlfriend Neelma Singh, and her siblings Kunal and Sidhi in April 2003. Sica is from an Italian family. Prior to the murders, he had numerous criminal convictions, including unlawful possession of a firearm and arson.

== Singh Murders ==
At 2.30pm on Tuesday April 22, 2003, Sica made an emergency call from 20 Grass Tree Close, Bridgeman Downs in Brisbane's north, where police arrived to find bodies of Singh siblings Neelma Singh, aged 24, Kunal Singh, aged 18, and Sidhi Singh, aged 12. All three had been murdered in their own home while their parents were in Fiji. Sidhi had been dumped in an upstairs spa bath that was still bubbling. Piping hot water was pouring into the bath from its taps, overflowing to such an extent that the ceiling of the floor below had buckled. Blood trails led from their bedrooms to the spa.

The sibling's parents Shirley and Vijay Singh asked police to remove Max Sica from their children's funeral service.

On 30 December 2008 Sica was formally charged with all three murders after a five and a half year investigation. The following year, Sica applied for bail twice, but was refused on both occasions. An appeal of the second refusal of bail was unsuccessful. In April 2010, Sica was committed to stand trial for the murders.

Sica pleaded not guilty to the murders. Before the trial, Sica's defence had applied under s590AA of the Criminal Code to have the evidence of Andrea Bowman of an admission of guilt by Sica excluded, however that application was dismissed. On 31 January 2012 his trial began. On 3 July, the jury found Sica guilty of three counts of murder.

On 5 July 2012, Sica was sentenced to life imprisonment, with a non-parole period of 35 years, the most severe sentence handed down in Queensland history. The sentencing remarks of Justice Byrne were scathing, describing Sica as "manipulative and deceitful", noting he had "no remorse whatsoever. Your only anxiety is for self-preservation".

Sica filed an appeal against his convictions on 27 July 2012. On 2 September 2013, the appeal was dismissed.

== Child sex charges ==
Sica was also charged with 21 sex offences, including two counts of rape and one of maintaining a sexual relationship with a child between 15 November 2004 and 10 September 2008. These charges were heard in the District Court of Queensland in a judge-only trial. Sica had sought and was granted a judge-only trial due to the widespread adverse publicity he received about the murder of the Singh siblings.

On 8 March 2013 Sica was found not guilty on all 21 counts. Judge Shanahan found that he could not be satisfied beyond reasonable doubt that the penetrative acts occurred as described by the complainant, remarking that "The complainant’s account of numerous acts of penetration having occurred since she was 9 years of age is not only not supported by the medical evidence, it makes her account highly unlikely".
