= Proof of Life (disambiguation) =

Proof of Life is a 2000 American kidnap thriller film.

Proof of Life may also refer to:

- Proof of life, a phrase referring to evidence used to indicate proof that a kidnap victim is still alive
- Proof of Life (The Bill), a 2008 crossover TV episode between SOKO Leipzig and The Bill
- Proof of Life (Scott Stapp album), 2013

- "Proof of Life", the title track from the Scott Stapp album
- Proof of Life, two concert tours in 2014 and 2016 by Stapp

- Proof of Life (Joy Oladokun album), 2023
- Proof of Life, 2007 studio album by Cesium_137
- "Proof of Life", a song by Brian Fallon from his 2018 album Sleepwalkers

== See also ==
- Evidence of extraterrestrial life
- Proof (disambiguation)
- Life (disambiguation)
