= Disappearance of Théo Hayez =

Disappearance of Belgian man in Australia

Théo Jean Hayez
- Born: 29 September 2000; Belgium
- Disappeared: 31 May 2019 (age 18); Cape Byron, New South Wales, Australia
- Status: Missing for 7 years, 4 months and 25 days
- Parents: Laurent Hayez (father); Vinciane Delforge (mother)

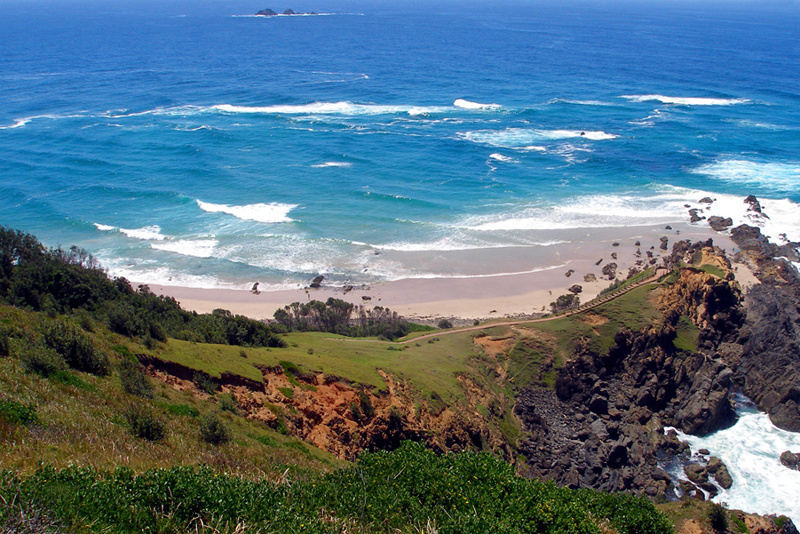
A175, Cape Byron, New South Wales, Australia, 2007

Théo Hayez was an 18-year-old Belgian man who disappeared in the Cape Byron area. He was last sighted leaving Cheeky Monkey's bar in Byron Bay at approximately 11:00 pm on 31 May 2019.

== Disappearance ==
Locations
1 115 Jonson St, Cheeky Monkey's bar - last sighting of Hayez.
2 Cosy Corner - Last known whereabouts based on mobile phone data.
3 Lighthouse.

Hayez arrived in Australia in late 2018 on a working holiday visa. He disappeared a week before he was due to fly home to Belgium. His family called New South Wales police on 6 June 2019, concerned about his lack of contact and that he had failed to return to his accommodation. The Wake Up! hostel where Hayez was staying also called the police on that same day, three days after Hayez failed to check out. His personal belongings, including his passport, were still in his room.

== Investigation ==
Australian police conducted searches along with helicopters, drones, cadaver dogs, trackers, divers, and rock climbers. Hayez's parents, Laurent Hayez and Vinciane Delforge, travelled to Australia to assist in the searches in June 2019. His father made a plea to the Australian people to help in the searches; "When I left Belgium I promised Théo's little brother, Lucas, I would bring his brother home, please help me keep my promise to him".

Hayez's final phone signal was determined to be in the proximity of Cape Byron on 1 June 2019. Investigations in conjunction with Hayez's family and Google suggest a last possible whereabouts in the vicinity of Cosy Corner, Tallow Beach. Messaging platform WhatsApp cooperated with NSW Police in the endeavour to recover chat logs from the night. However, the information WhatsApp could provide was limited due to encryption.

The Hayez family continued to push the authorities to maintain a focus on the case and to follow up leads. In July, a grey Puma hat, similar to the one Hayez was wearing when he was last seen, was found in bushland at Tallow Beach by community search volunteers who had responded to the family's plight in the months afterwards.

As the case slowed down, the official police theory became that Hayez fell from the cliffs near the lighthouse as a "misadventure". The reasons for Hayez to be there after midnight are various: he was lost; he was misdirected by Google Maps; he was under the effect of alcohol or drugs; he was suicidal; he was taken there by a local (given the knowledge needed to travel the bush route at night); he was heading for a party; or, he was hurt or attacked by someone. The absence of a body could be explained by human intervention, being lost in the bush, taken by a shark, or swept away by tides. A coroner's inquest was set for November 2021.

In 2024, it was reported that an inquest had ruled that Hayez died shortly after leaving the Cheeky Monkey bar, but it could not be determined if his death had been accidental or the result of foul play. Regarding the investigation, Hayez's niece said, "We could see there was a lack of resources in the police force and that’s something that needs to be worked on."

== Media ==
The case soon became well known in Australia and Europe and interest continues more than two years later.

Per Hayez's family's request, The Australian national crime correspondent David Murray joined the searches. Murray spent three months with the unofficial search party and documented the case in late 2019 in a 6-part Australian crime podcast called The Lighthouse.

== See also ==
- List of people who disappeared mysteriously: post-1970
