= History Cold Case =

- Genre: Television documentary
- Directed by: Mike Taylor; Neil Ferguson; Harvey Lilley
- Narrated by: Laurence Fox; Stephen Mangan
- Theme music composer: Rob Lord
- Country of origin: United Kingdom
- Original language: English
- No. of seasons: 2
- No. of episodes: 8

Production
- Executive producers: Natalie Humphreys; Cassian Harrison
- Running time: 57 minutes
- Production company: Red Planet Pictures / Shine TV

Original release
- Network: BBC Two
- Release: 6 May 2010 – 21 July 2011

Related
- The Decrypters

History Cold Case is a British documentary television series in which scientists use modern forensic techniques to investigate ancient remains. Two series of History Cold Case aired on BBC Two between 6 May 2010 and 21 July 2011. The television series is recommended for age 17 and above due to graphic images and maturity.

== Overview ==
Anthropologist Sue Black and her team at the Centre for Anatomy & Human Identification (CAHID) at the University of Dundee investigate human remains. They use forensic science, including radiocarbon dating, DNA and isotope analysis, to find out about the life and death of each set of remains, which range in date from the Bronze Age to the Victorian era. In some cases, they search through historic records to try to locate a name. In each episode, the team travels to a different location in Great Britain and set up a mobile lab to do their work. At the conclusion, they present their findings, including facial reconstruction, to the local community.

== Cast ==
- Sue Black, forensic anthropologist
- Xanthé Mallett, forensic anthropologist and criminologist
- Caroline Wilkinson, anthropologist who creates facial reconstructions
- Wolfram Meier-Augenstein, expert in isotope analysis (series 1)

== Episodes ==
=== Series 1 (2010) ===
| No. overall | No. in series | Title | Original release date |
|---|---|---|---|
| 1 | 1 | "Ipswich Man" | 6 May 2010 |
Series premiere. The team investigate the remains of a 13th-century North African (likely Tunisian) man found in a grave in Ipswich.
| 2 | 2 | "Mummified Child" | 13 May 2010 |
A 19th-century mummified child, used as an anatomical model, is examined.
| 3 | 3 | "Stirling Man" | 20 May 2010 |
The team search for the identity of a 14th-century man given a knight's burial at Stirling Castle.
| 4 | 4 | "Crossbones Girl" | 27 May 2010 |
The team seek to put a name and face to a 19th-century female found in a pauper's grave in Cross Bones, London.

=== Series 2 (2011) ===
| No. overall | No. in series | Title | Original release date |
|---|---|---|---|
| 5 | 1 | "The Skeletons of Windy Pits" | 30 June 2011 |
The team investigate 2,000-year-old remains found in the Ryedale Windypits.
| 6 | 2 | "The York 113" | 7 July 2011 |
The skeletons of 113 men are found in a mass grave in found outside the walls of York. The team search for ties to the Siege of York, and investigate two skeletons that both show rare genetic abnormalities.
| 7 | 3 | "The Bodies in the Well" | 14 July 2011 |
The team investigate the remains of 17 people, including 11 children, pulled from a well in Norwich. DNA analysis shows they may all be from a single family that suffered a horrific fate.
| 8 | 4 | "The Woman and Three Babies" | 21 July 2011 |
The team investigate the puzzling case of a woman from the time of the Roman occupation of Britain, oddly buried with three babies, unearthed in Baldock in 1989.

== See also ==
- Forensic archaeology
- Time Team
- Cold Case Files
