= Disappearance of Rachel Antonio =

1998 murder in Queensland, Australia

Rachel Antonio
- Born: 20 March 1982
- Died: 25 April 1998 (aged 16); Bowen, Queensland, Australia
- Cause of death: Likely homicide
- Occupation: High School Student
- Height: 165 cm (5 ft 5 in)

Rachel Joy Antonio (20 March 1982 – 25 April 1998) was an Australian teenager who is believed to have been murdered in Bowen, Queensland on 25 April 1998.

Robert Paul Hytch was charged with Antonio's murder but at a trial in 1999 a jury found him not guilty of murder but guilty of manslaughter. He was sentenced to nine years in jail but the verdict was overturned on appeal and Hytch was tried again in 2001 but was acquitted.

In 2016, following a 12-day coronial inquest, Queensland Coroner David O'Connell delivered his findings in Bowen. He found that Robert Hytch had likely killed Antonio and had hidden her body. However, O'Connell was unable to determine the precise cause of death or where her body was.

Antonio's body was never located. A $250,000 reward is currently on offer for any person who reveals the location of her remains.

== Background ==
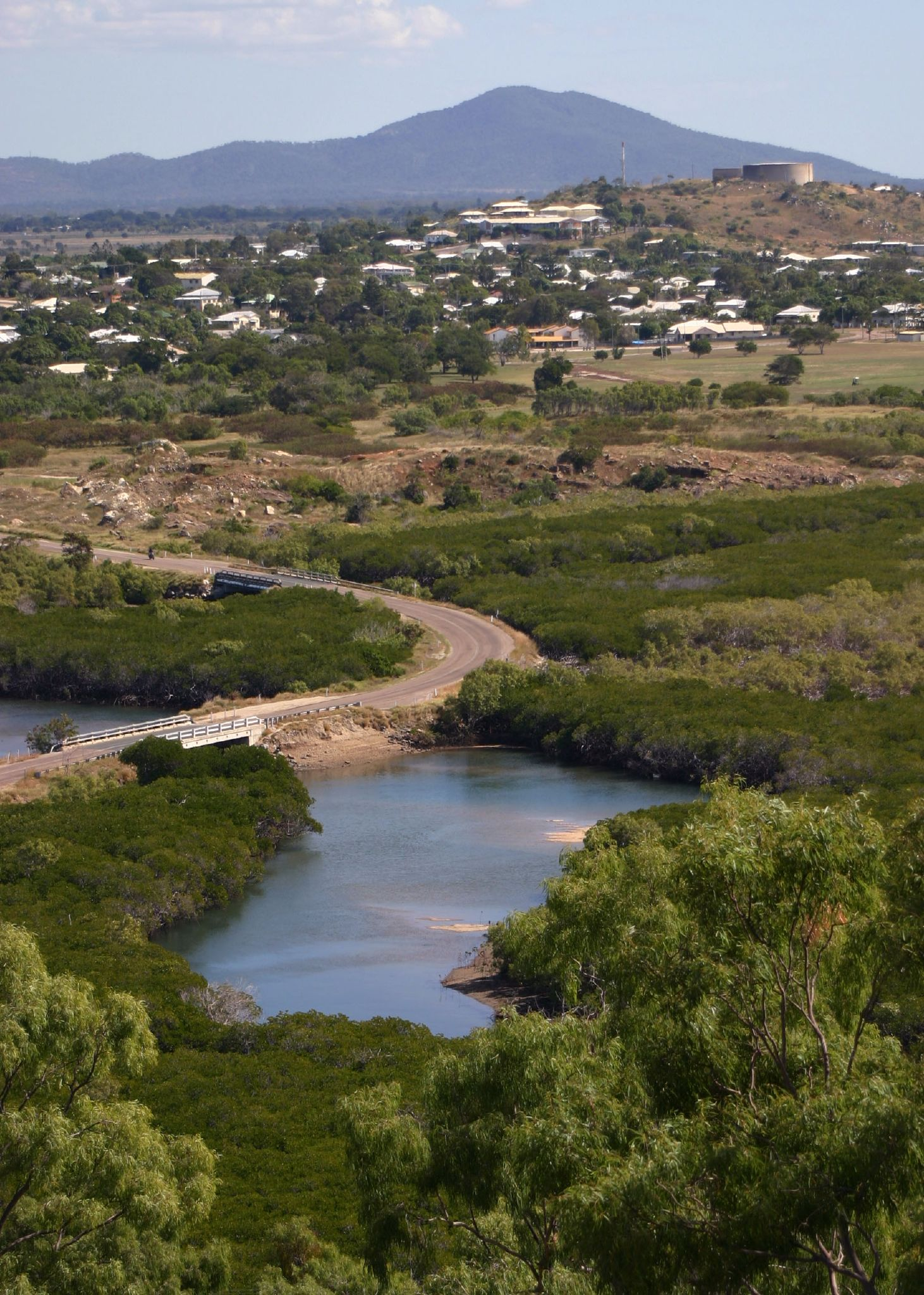
A view of Bowen from Flagstaff Hill, 2005

Antonio lived with her family in the North Queensland town of Bowen, where she had grown up. She was the fourth child of Ian and Cheryl Antonio and was a student at Bowen State High School.

Antonio's extra curricular activities centred around volunteering with Surf Life Saving Australia and serving with the Australian Air Force Cadets. She valued her experience with the Air Force cadets as she intended to pursue a career in the Australian Defence Force.

With 25 April being a national day when Australia commemorates Anzac Day, Antonio had attended a school Anzac ceremony on 24 April and then the local dawn service on 25 April before marching in the local street parade later that morning.

== Disappearance ==
Locations
1 18:00 End of Beach Avenue
2 18:45 Queens Beach

At approximately 6pm on 25 April, her mother dropped her to the Summer Garden Cinema on the corner of Beach Avenue and Murroona Street in Bowen to see the 7pm screening of Good Will Hunting. However, the cinema owner, who knew Antonio, has always maintained that Antonio never watched the film. It was later determined that Antonio had instead walked to the end of Beach Avenue, 200 metres from the cinema.

She was seen leaving the beach by witnesses at approximately 6:45pm and was last seen walking along Queen's Beach Esplanade.

Diary entries uncovered after Antonio's disappearance appeared to suggest she had been in a sexual relationship with surf life saving captain, Robert Hytch. However, Hytch maintained he had not had a relationship with her nor had any involvement in her disappearance.

== Trials ==
Hytch was charged with Antonio's murder and stood trial in 1999 where a jury found him guilty of manslaughter but not guilty of murder.

The diary entries were ruled inadmissible during Hytch's trials and he swore under oath that he had not had a relationship with Antonio.

Hytch served nine months of his sentence before his conviction was overturned following an appeal.

He stood trial again in 2001 but was acquitted.

== Inquest ==
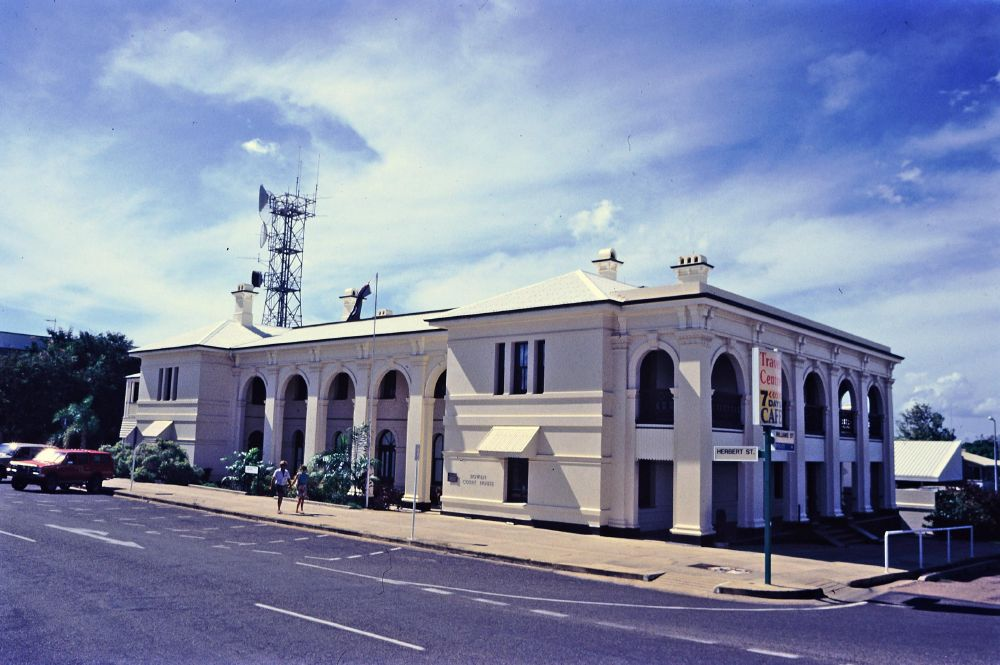
Bowen Court House, 1995

Since Antonio's disappearance, her parents had pushed for a coronial inquest into their daughter's death. An exhaustive coronial inquest was held into Antonio's disappearance throughout 2014 and 2015. It was opened on 26 May 2014, and evidence was heard throughout three separate time periods - between 21 July 2014 and 25 July 2014, between 1 September 2014 and 5 September 2014 and between 15 June 2015 and 17 June 2015.

Antonio's father Ian Antonio was involved in several incidents with members of the media who were in Bowen to cover the inquest, the most serious of which was an alleged attack on Townsville Bulletin senior photographer Scott Radford-Chisolm. Upon leaving the Bowen Courthouse with his wife on 16 June 2015, Ian Antonio allegedly attacked Radford-Chisolm and repeatedly punched him in the head. The alleged attack on Radford-Chisolm prompted Townsville Bulletin editor Lachlan Heywood to state: "It's a sensitive case. We obviously understand the pressure the family is under, but this newspaper ... has also done a lot of hard work to get this inquest heard. He (Radford-Chisolm) wasn't being invasive. My understanding is that Ian, the father, went a long way out of his way to get to him." Ian Antonio had also earlier allegedly hit a female Seven News journalist in the head with her own microphone.

=== Findings ===
Coroner David O'Connell described the 12 days of evidence as being an "extraordinary" amount of time for a coronial inquest but "understandable" when it had involved 367 witness statements, more than 2,600 pages of court transcripts, seven taped police interviews, four days of Queensland Crime Commission hearings and the examination of 60 witnesses.

When O'Connell delivered his findings at Bowen on 28 July 2016, he concluded that Hytch had indeed caused a fatal injury to Antonio during a physical altercation in which had become "enraged" at Antonio's naive, schoolgirl deception regarding her false claim that she had been pregnant. O'Connell found that Hytch had caused her death and that he had hidden her body.

O'Connell stated: "A physical altercation between the two of them has then occurred. It is not difficult at all to realise that if a physical altercation between them occurred Mr Hytch who was 6 foot, 5 inches tall, and of a physically strong, athletic build, could easily, and quickly, cause injury to the slightly (though unquestionably fit) built 5 foot 3 inch tall Rachel. It would not take much force, whether deliberate or unintended, for Rachel to be overpowered or suffer a fatal injury...I find that a meeting between the two of them occurred on that evening at a little after 7.00 PM and that shortly after that time Mr Hytch has caused a fatal injury to Rachel and thereby caused her death."

O'Connell stated he was unable to determine how Hytch disposed of Antonio's body but suggested he could have either buried it in a shallow grave somewhere in the vicinity of Kings Beach or he could have swum her body out to sea with the use of a surf lifesaving paddleboard where he could have left the body, possibly weighted down, which would have been an easy task for an accomplished surf lifesaver.

O'Connell described Antonio's blood being found on Hytch's reef sandals as "significant" and found that this had occurred on the evening she disappeared, indicating that she had been seriously injured, perhaps fatally, in close proximity to Hytch who had offered no plausible explanation to how this occurred.

He also rejected Hytch's denial of having had a relationship with Antonio, stating: "I specifically reject Mr Hytch's denial of there being no intimate, personal, relationship between Rachel and himself." As a result, O'Connell referred Hytch to the Director of Public Prosecutions to investigate whether he could be charged with perjury.

Hytch attempted to have the inquest findings overturned but was unsuccessful, but the findings were upheld by the Supreme Court in April 2018.

== Legacy ==
In 2016, a five-part true crime podcast about Antonio's murder was produced by The Courier-Mail investigative journalist David Murray who had been approached by Antonio's parents who proposed he write a book about their daughter after having read his book about the murder of Allison Baden-Clay. For his work creating the podcast, Murray was awarded the 2017 Journalist of the Year at the Queensland Clarion Awards.

Antonio's parents commemorated the 25th anniversary of their daughter's murder in 2023, and are still seeking answers as to where their daughter's body is located. They have refused to hold a memorial service for their daughter until they know where her remains are, but do always light a candle each Anzac Day in their daughter's memory. Antonio's father Ian Antonio has maintained his belief that his daughter's body had been taken to the Bowen rubbish dump which wasn't searched until many years after her disappearance.

A $250,000 reward is currently being offered by the Queensland Police Service for anyone who provides information relating to the location of Antonio's remains. The award had previously been offered in an attempt to catch her killer but was amended in 2014 as the focus shifted to the recovery of Antonio's remains.

=== Other Bowen murders ===
Somewhat unusually for a small Queensland town, Antonio's likely murder on 25 April 1998 was the third such incident to have occurred at Bowen in a six-month period.

Herbert Edward Murray was shot dead at his residence on East Euri Creek Road near Bowen on 13 November 1997. That murder remains unsolved and a $250,000 reward is on offer for information which leads to the conviction of those responsible for his death.

Diane Mary Angwin was stabbed to death in her home in Leichhardt Street, Bowen on 2 December 1997 by an unknown male assailant. That murder also remains unsolved and a $250,000 reward is also offered for information which leads to the conviction of those responsible for her death.
