= Sherele Moody =

Australian journalist, researcher, and activist

Sherele Moody is an Australian journalist and activist known for her work on femicide and violence against women.

== Career ==
Moody has worked as a journalist and commentator, writing for publications including The Daily Telegraph and The Courier-Mail. Her work focuses on reporting and analysis of violence against women and children, as well as broader social issues.

=== Activism ===
Moody founded Australian Femicide Watch, RED HEART Movement, and She Matters podcast, all focused on documenting and commemorating awareness of women and girls killed by violence in Australia. Moody has been involved in the creation of public memorials, including the She Matters mural in Hosier Lane, Melbourne. ABC featured her work on cover domestic violence and public memorials related to violence against women.

== Awards and recognition ==
- 2023 June Andrews Award for Women’s Leadership in Media
- 2020 Journalist of the Year (B&T Women in Media Awards)
- 2019 SOPA Award for opinion writing
- 2017 Queensland Clarion Awards
