= Andrew Rule =

Australian journalist (born 1957)

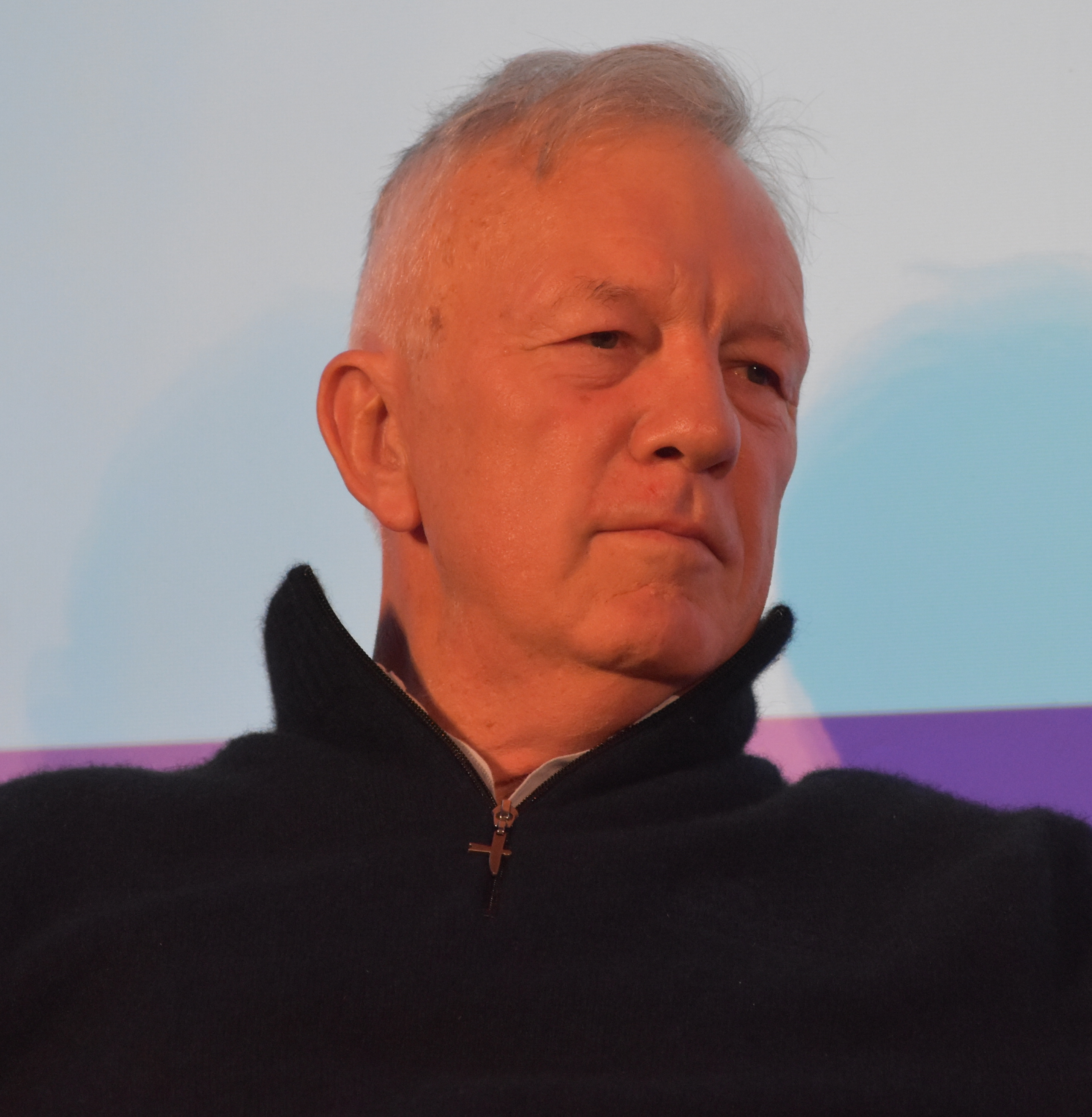
Rule in 2025 at Queenscliffe Literary Festival

Andrew Rule (born 8 April 1957) is an Australian journalist who specialises in crime.

== Early life ==
Andrew Rule was born in country Victoria in 1957, later attending high school in Sale. He dropped out of journalism at RMIT before completing an arts degree at Monash University.

== Career ==
Rule started aged 17 as a reporter for The Gippsland Times and Maffra Spectator. He subsequently worked for The Age, The Sun News-Pictorial, The Herald, Sunday Age the Herald Sun and radio station 3AW.

The Murders of Margaret and Seana Tapp was a cold case that Rule has worked to bring renewed attention to in articles for both The Age and Herald Sun.

Rule wrote an authorised biography of Australian media proprietor and billionaire Kerry Stokes to counter bad press from an unauthorised work by Margaret Simons that included testimony from an abandoned family.

He began a podcast series, Life and Crimes with Andrew Rule, in 2017.

In 2021, Rule was involved in a controversy where he falsely accused the late former Labor premier Neville Wran of corruption. The reports on which his commentary and claims were based were found to be false in an ABC editorial review.

== Personal life ==
Rule is married to Di Rule who ran as a Liberal Party candidate for Seymour in the 1999 state election and Burwood in the 2002 state election.

== Books ==
Rule has authored a number of books:

- Cuckoo: A True Story Of Murder And Its Detection (1988)
- Rose Against the Odds: The Lionel Rose Story (1991)
- The Silent War: Behind the Police Killings That Shook Australia, ISBN 0-6462506-4-7 (1995) with John Silvester and Owen Davies
- The Evil: Inside the Mind of a Child Killer (1997) with Margaret Hobbs
- Tough: 101 Australian Gangsters: A Crime Companion, ISBN 0-9579121-2-9 (2002) with John Silvester
- Sex, Death and Betrayal: True Crimes and Other Stories (2004) with John Silvester
- Leadbelly: Inside Australia's Underworld Wars, ISBN 0-9752318-0-4 (2004)
- Gotcha: How Australia's Baddest Crooks Copped Their Right Whack, ISBN 0-9752318-5-5 (2005) with John Silvester
- Rats: Crooks Who Got Away With It: Tails of True Crime and Mystery from the Underbelly Archives, ISBN 0-9775440-0-1 (2006) with John Silvester
- Kerry Stokes: The Boy from Nowhere (2014)
- Man & Beast (2016)
- Rule On Crime: 10 Crime Stories You Won't Forget (2017)
- Winx: The Authorised Biography (2018)
- Chance (2021)

=== Underbelly ===
With John Silvester, he co-wrote the Underbelly series of books about crime which were subsequently adapted into a TV series.

- Underbelly: True Crime Stories, ISBN 0-646-33924-9 (1997)
- Underbelly 2: More True Crime Stories, ISBN 0-9586071-1-7 (1998)
- Underbelly 3: Some More True Crime Stories, ISBN 0-9586071-3-3 (1999)
- Underbelly 4: More True Crime Stories, ISBN 0-9586071-6-8 (2000)
- Underbelly 5: More True Crime Stories, ISBN 0-9586071-8-4 (2001)
- Underbelly 6: True Crime Stories, ISBN 0-9579121-3-7 (2002)
- Underbelly 7: More True Crime Stories, ISBN 0-9579121-6-1 (2003)
- Underbelly 8: More True Crime Stories, ISBN 0-9752318-2-0 (2004)
- Underbelly 9: More True Crime Stories, ISBN 0-9752318-7-1 (2005)
- Underbelly 10: More True Crime Stories, ISBN 0-9775440-3-6 (2006)
- Underbelly 11: True Crime Stories, ISBN 0-9775440-5-2 (2007)
- Underbelly: The Gangland War, ISBN 978-0-9775440-6-6 (2008)
- Underbelly: A Tale of Two Cities, ISBN 978-0-9775440-9-7 (2009)
- Underbelly: The Golden Mile, ISBN 978-0-9806971-0-0 (2010)
- Underbelly: The Golden Casket, ISBN 978-0-9807170-3-7 (2010)
- Underbelly: Mokbelly, ISBN 978-0-9807170-5-1 (2013)
- Underbelly: Where the Bodies Are Buried, ISBN 978-0-9807170-6-8 (2015)
- Underbelly: Shot at Close Range, ISBN 978-0-9807170-7-5 (2016)

== Awards ==
Rule is an inductee in The Australian Media Hall of Fame. He was also twice (1996; 2001) the recipient of the Graham Perkin Australian Journalist of the Year Award. In 2001, he won the Gold Walkley award for his story Geoff Clarke: Power and rape. He was awarded the Ned Kelly Awards for Crime Writing Lifetime Achievement in 2006, jointly with John Silvester.
