= Ron Iddles =

Australian police detective (born 1954)

Ron Iddles OAM APM
- Born: 1954 (age 71–72)
- Occupation: Homicide detective
- Known for: Success as homicide detective and high conviction rate
- Honours: Medal of the Order of Australia; Australian Police Medal

Ronald William Iddles OAM APM is an Australian former police detective. His conviction rate was 99% and he was dubbed "Australia's greatest detective". After a career spanning some 43 years investigating serious crime, he took up the role of Secretary of the Police Association of Victoria between 2014 and 2016. He retired in 2016, but he was lured out of retirement the following year and is currently Victoria's inaugural Community Safety Trustee.

== Early life ==
Ron Iddles was born in 1954 in central Victoria. He is the son of William "Bill" Iddles and Phyllis Iddles. He has a twin brother, Barry Iddles, and an older sister. His early years were spent growing up on a dairy farm in Rochester, where he assisted his father milking 120 cows before school each day, and on the weekends carting hay and driving tractors. He played football, as a ruckman, for the Echuca Football Club in the first XVIII while in his teens.

His interest in police work came from watching a long-running, local television drama series, Homicide (aired 1964–1977). He attended Echuca Technical School and after completing his secondary education, became a police cadet at the age of 18.

== Career ==
Iddles joined the Victoria Police in 1972. His early police career was in the uniform branch working in and around Collingwood, one of Melbourne's inner suburbs and he was later transferred to Fitzroy Criminal Investigation Branch. He became a homicide detective in 1980, and his first case was the murder of 38-year old Thornbury resident Maria James on 17 June 1980 (which was covered in detail by the ABC podcast Trace in 2017–2021). During the 1980s, he was seconded to the National Crime Authority.

In 1989, he retired from policing altogether and began his own trucking business. In 1994, he returned to policing, starting out as a constable again. Within three years, he worked his way back to his former rank as a detective senior sergeant with Homicide Division where he was involved in investigating serious crime. In 2012, he headed up the Cold Case Homicide Division. The same year, he was involved in solving the 1983 cold case murder of 16-year old Shepparton resident, Michelle Buckingham. He left Homicide Division in 2014 and became the Secretary of the Police Union, where he was instrumental in raising awareness of mental health issues for serving police officers.

In 2015, Iddles was made a Member of the Order of Australia (OAM) for services to the community. He is widely known as "Australia's greatest detective." During his career, which spanned 37 years, 25 of which were spent in homicide, he investigated more than 300 murder cases and hundreds of suspicious deaths. His homicide conviction rate was 99%.

== Retirement ==
He retired from the police in 2016, but was enticed to come out of retirement to take up the position as Victoria's inaugural Community Safety Trustee, a role that involves serving as an independent voice for the community and overseeing the state's community safety budget. In 2017, he finally retired and moved to a township near Cairns in Queensland.

Iddles is also the subject of a 2017 book, The Good Cop, written by Justine Ford and published by Macmillan. In 2019, Iddles starred in a Foxtel Crime + Investigation series based on the book, which won a Silver Logie for the TV show (Logie Award for Most Outstanding Factual or Documentary Program) in 2019. He also features in a podcast series titled Ron Iddles: The Good Cop.

In 2021, Iddles starred in a six-episode series named 'Homicide by Ron Iddles' on Channel 7.
