= Akuna Bay =

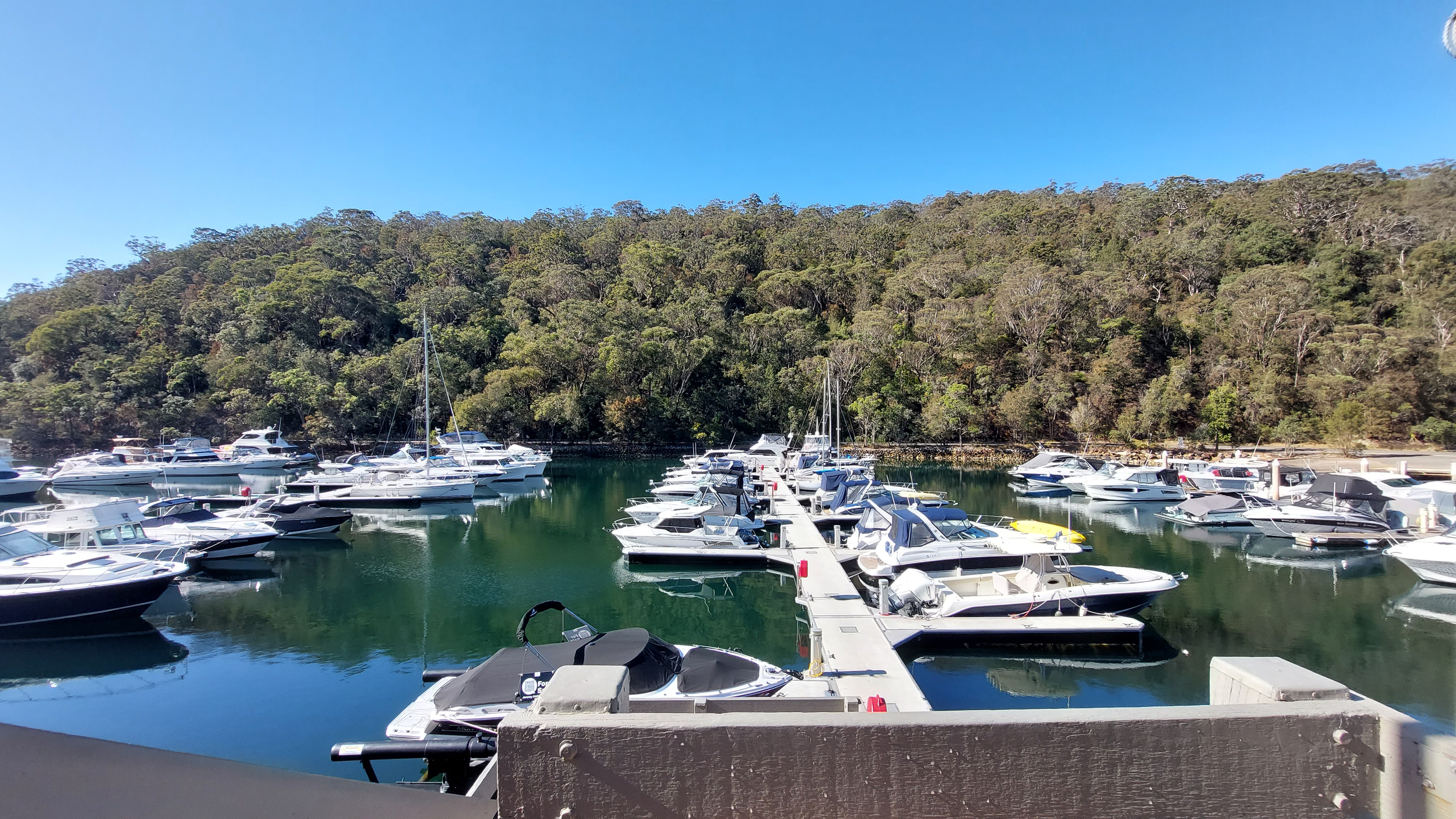

- Location of Akuna Bay in New South Wales
- Location: Northern Sydney
- Coordinates: 33°38′40″S 151°14′11″E
- Type: Bay
- Primary inflows: Coal and Candle Creek
- Primary outflows: Broken Bay
- Basin countries: Australia
- Frozen: never
- Settlements: Akuna Bay

The Akuna Bay is a bay within Broken Bay, located in the Northern Beaches Council local government area in the Northern Suburbs of Sydney, Australia. The bay is fed by Coal and Candle Creek, with its land boundaries encased within the Ku-ring-gai Chase National Park. A large marina in located within the bay. The urban locality of Akuna Bay is located at the southern boundary of the bay.

Akuna is an Aboriginal word meaning "to follow".
