= Hungry Beach =

Beach in Sydney, Australia

- Beach
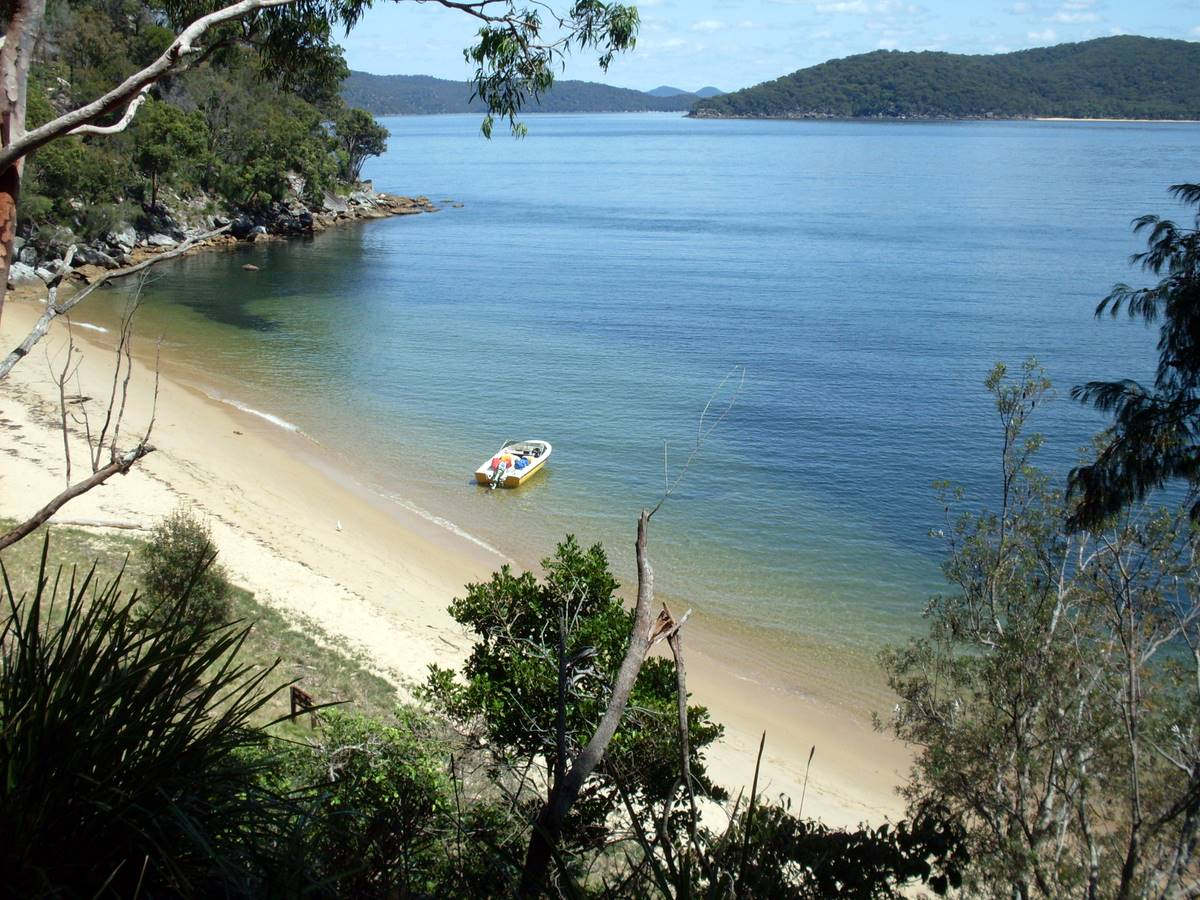
- Interactive map of Hungry Beach
- Coordinates: 33°34′59″S 151°16′33″E
- Location: Ku-ring-gai Chase National Park, Australia
- Offshore water bodies: Hawkesbury River
- Geology: Narrabeen Group of sedimentary rocks
- Operator: NSW National Parks & Wildlife Service

Dimensions
  - Length: 0.13 kilometres (0.081 mi)
- Patrolled?: beach not patrolled
- Camping: not allowed
- Access: private boat

Hungry Beach is situated beside Cowan Creek and the Hawkesbury River in Ku-ring-gai Chase National Park in the northern part of Sydney, Australia.

The north facing beach is about one kilometre from the ruins of the Flint & Steel Guesthouse. The beach is protected by steep cliffs. Above the beach are caves and middens, and a small densely vegetated gully with a fresh water stream. Access to the beach is by private boat; there is no formal bushwalking track but the beach can be reached by foot from Flint and Steel Bay.

Hungry Beach was known as a fishing area, particularly for shark, turtle and mulloway. In 1936, The Sydney Mail reported that an indigenous man was shot dead by shark fishermen at Hungry Beach. The newspaper says he was the last surviving member of the Barrenjoey people. In 1899, the wreckage of the steam launch "Hatte", lying on Hungry Beach was sold for £25.

The beach allegedly gets its name from a fisherman who became hungry, waiting for three days for a large shark to leave the area. Previously, the shark attacked his rowboat while fishing.

== Royal Australian Navy in World War Two ==
Offshore and nearby, are concrete and brick relics of Indicator Loop & Controlled Mining Station number 285, constructed by the Royal Australian Navy during world war two. Mines were laid in this area. An indicator loop was an electrically charged cable, used to indicate shipping movements. In this case, the cable was situated from Hungry Beach to Juno Point at Patonga, two kilometres distant on the opposite side of the Hawkesbury River. The cable was used in the detection of Japanese submarines and to protect the railway bridge. An infra red photo electric beam shone 2.6 kilometres from Hungry Point to the Central Coast, in order to detect enemy shipping.

A government auction sale was held in August 1945 for building related articles at Hungry Beach. Items included a 61 foot long mess hut, a 42 foot long sleeping hut, hot water boiler, 1,000 gallon tank, 300 gallon tank and stand, fuel range with double oven, doors, windows and linings. As well as fittings from the brick power hut, a latrine, moorings and a 25 by 7 foot boat.

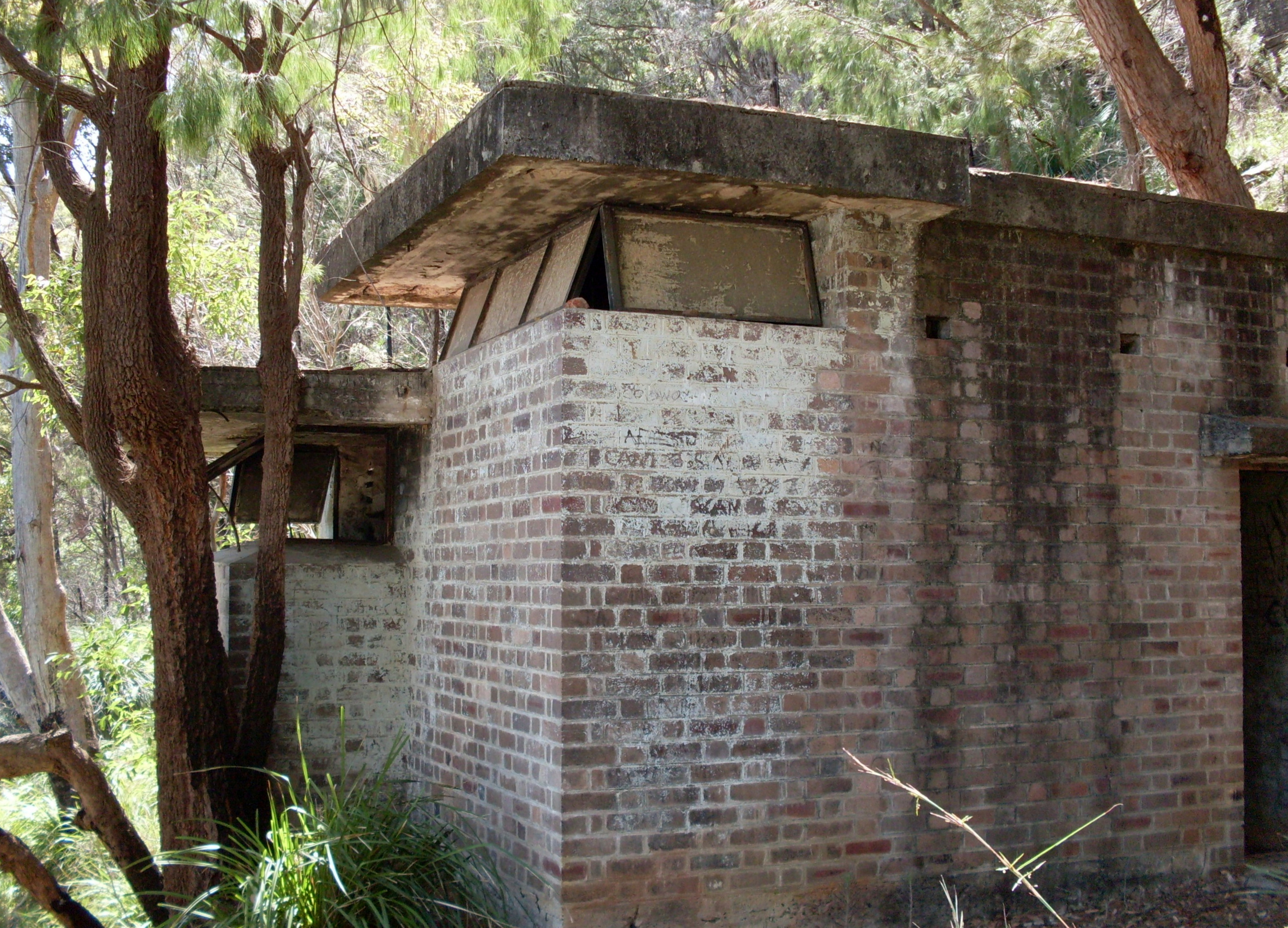
Brick power hut, built by the Royal Australian Navy, above Hungry Beach
