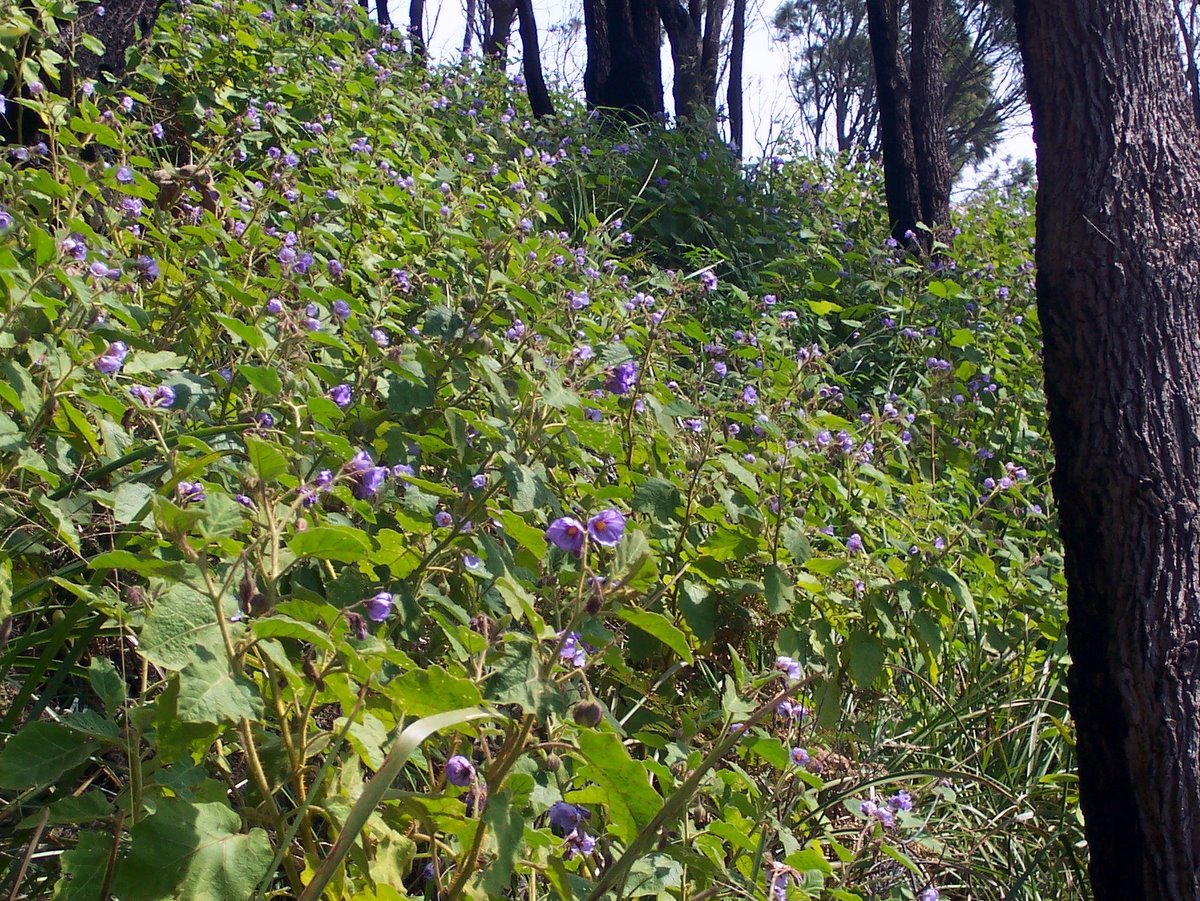
- A hillside dominated by eastern nightshade, Ku-ring-gai Chase National Park, Australia

Scientific classification
- Kingdom: Plantae
- Clade: Tracheophytes
- Clade: Angiosperms
- Clade: Eudicots
- Clade: Asterids
- Order: Solanales
- Family: Solanaceae
- Genus: Solanum
- Species: S. pungetium

Binomial name
- Solanum pungetium R.Br.

= Solanum pungetium =

Eastern nightshade

Species of flowering plant

Solanum pungetium, known as the eastern nightshade is a small, low spreading plant native to the east coast of Australia.

Leaves are spiky, elliptic in shape, 5 to 8 cm long, 2 to 4 cm wide. Stems, flower stalks and branches also spiky. The leaf stem is around 1 cm long. Flowers are typical of the Australian Solanum group, being purple to blue with a yellow centre, appearing in spring. The fruit is pale yellow green berry with darker green markings. It's around 25 to 30 mm in diameter, on a stem 2 to 5 cm long.

The habitat is moist areas, in sclerophyll forest, or disturbed areas in rainforest. Found in the states of Victoria and south of the Clarence River, New South Wales, often near the coast.

This plant was first published by Robert Brown in 1810, in his epic Prodromus Florae Novae Hollandiae.
