= Bay of Many Coves / Miritū Bay =

Locality in New Zealand

Bay of Many Coves
- Miritū Bay
- Location within New Zealand
- Location: Marlborough Sounds
- Coordinates: 41°19′28″S 174°16′51″E
- Type: Bay
- Part of: Queen Charlotte Sound
- Basin countries: New Zealand

Miritū / Bay of Many Coves in Tōtaranui / Queen Charlotte Sound

Bay of Many Coves, or Miritū Bay, is a bay in Queen Charlotte Sound, New Zealand, east of Ruakākā Bay and Blackwood Bay. It is one of the larger bays of the inner sound, located north of the Tory Channel it is vulnerable to southerly winds.

== Naming ==
Miritū is a difficult name to pin down. Separately, the syllables miri and tū have many meanings. Alexander Wyclif Reed rendered speculation on the meaning of Miritū idle due to this range of possible translations. Some potential meanings offered by Sherwood Roberts in 1911 were: 'to wound while passing onwards', 'to strike an enemy while passing', 'a coarse flax mat to stand on'.

Bay of Many Coves is a reference to the many small bays situated within it. A number of these bays, and those throughout the Marlborough Sounds are named after poets and characters from literature. Ironically the Bay of Many Coves only has one of the locality that uses the word cove in its name, and even that was initially called Cockle Bay.

== Contained geographies ==
=== Snake Point and Bull Head ===
Snake Point is located on the eastern point at the entrance to Bay of Many Coves, while Bull Head is located on the western point. Both points have rocks below them and should be given a wide berth, especially Snake Point, which has a large reef extending out beneath the waves.

Taumoana means 'a partition of the sea'. Archdeacon Grace posited that the name is a misspelling of Te-au-moana, meaning 'a current of the sea' referencing strong currents in the area.

Snake Point is likely a reference to the thin, curving land leading to the point.

Bull Head was renamed from East Head after an enquiry to districts from the Geographic Board regarding duplicate places by the East Head name. The new name was submitted by the Chief Surveyor in Blenheim in April 1970.

=== Chaucer Bay, Milton Bay and Pope Bay ===
All three of these bays are named for famous poets. Chaucer Bay after Geoffrey Chaucer, Milton Bay after John Milton, and Pope Bay after Alexander Pope. Chaucer Bay sits at the back of the bay, with Pope Bay just south east of it, while Milton Bay sits in the far eastern corner.

=== Aratawa Bay ===
Aratawa Bay is situated at the back of the bay, just west of Chaucer Bay.

=== Arthurs Bay ===
Arthurs Bay has a less obvious origin than its counterparts. It may be named after Captain Arthur Wakefield, poet Arthur Rimbaud, the mythical King Arthur, or a previous inhabitant of the cove. The bay is well sheltered, only vulnerable to easterly winds, with a sand and cobble beach.

=== Cockle Cove ===
Cockle Cove was renamed from Cockle Bay after an enquiry to districts from the Geographic Board regarding duplicate places by the Cockle Bay name. The new name was submitted by the Chief Surveyor in Blenheim in April 1970. The name references cockles, small mollusks found across the country.
