= Ruakākā Bay =

Locality in New Zealand

- Location: Marlborough Sounds
- Coordinates: 41°11′54″S 174°07′34″E

Ruakākā Bay in Queen Charlotte Sound / Tōtaranui

Ruakākā Bay is a bay in Queen Charlotte Sound, New Zealand, sitting between Blackwood Bay and Bay of Many Coves / Miritū Bay.

== Naming ==
Ruakākā is a combination of the Māori language words rua, meaning "hole", and kākā, the native parrot Nestor meridionalis. Together the name means "kākā hole/s", referencing the kākā nests built in holes in the trees there. Ruakākā Bay was dubbed "Fly Bay" on John Lort Stokes' map.

== Contained geographies ==
=== Cherry Bay ===
Cherry Bay is located on Ruakākā Bay's eastern coast, between Ratimera Bay and Moriori Bay. The bay's name is likely a reference to cherry trees being planted there, much like Cherry Tree Bay on D'Urville Island.

=== Moriori Bay ===
Moriori Bay is located on the western coast of Ruakākā Bay, between Cherry Bay and Wairākau Bay. The bay is likely named for the Moriori, the native people of the Chatham Islands. Pit dwellings, similar to those used by the Moriori, have been found in various places throughout the Marlborough Sounds. Linguistic studies have shown the Moriori ancestors likely immigrated from New Zealand around 1500CE, as the Moriori language shares many characteristics with the Ngāi Tahu dialect of the Māori language.

=== Ngatakore Point ===
Ngatakore Point is located on the eastern tip of Ruakākā Bay.

Ngatakore can be split into two Māori language words, ngata meaning "snail" or "slug", and kore meaning "broken" or "no longer". Together, the name can be taken to mean "broken snail shell" or "no longer snails/slugs".

=== Pirapu Bay & Pirapu Point ===
Pirapu Bay is the only named bay on the eastern coast of Ruakākā Bay. Pirapu Point sits at its northern tip.

The Māori language name Pīrapu can be split into two words, pī meaning "the young of birds", and rapu meaning "to search/hunt for". Together, the name means "to search/hunt for young birds".

=== Ratimera Bay & Ratimera Point ===
Ratimera Bay is the northern most bay on the western coast of Ruakākā Bay. Ratimera Point marks its northern tip.

The Māori language name Rātimera can be split into two words, rā meaning "over there" or "yonder", and timera meaning "chimney" or "funnel". Together, the name could mean "place to spot ship chimneys", or simply "chimney". Historian William Henry Sherwood Roberts posits it means "the yonder headland cliff".

=== West Head ===
West Head is located on the eastern tip of Ruakākā Bay. West Head is a reference to the points location opposite Tory Channel. Its counterpart, East Head, is now known as Bull Head. Other points known as West Head in New Zealand can be found here.

=== Luke Rock ===
Luke Rock sits in the entrance to Ruakākā Bay. The rock is marked by a white beacon with a flashing green light. The water around Luke Rock is relatively deep, with the North-East side containing weeds and a depth of only two metres.

=== Wairākau Bay ===
The Māori language name Wairākau can be split into two Māori language words, wai meaning "water", and rākau meaning "tree" or "stick". Together, the name means "trees in the water" or "waterlogged sticks".
