= Cottage Point =

- Suburb
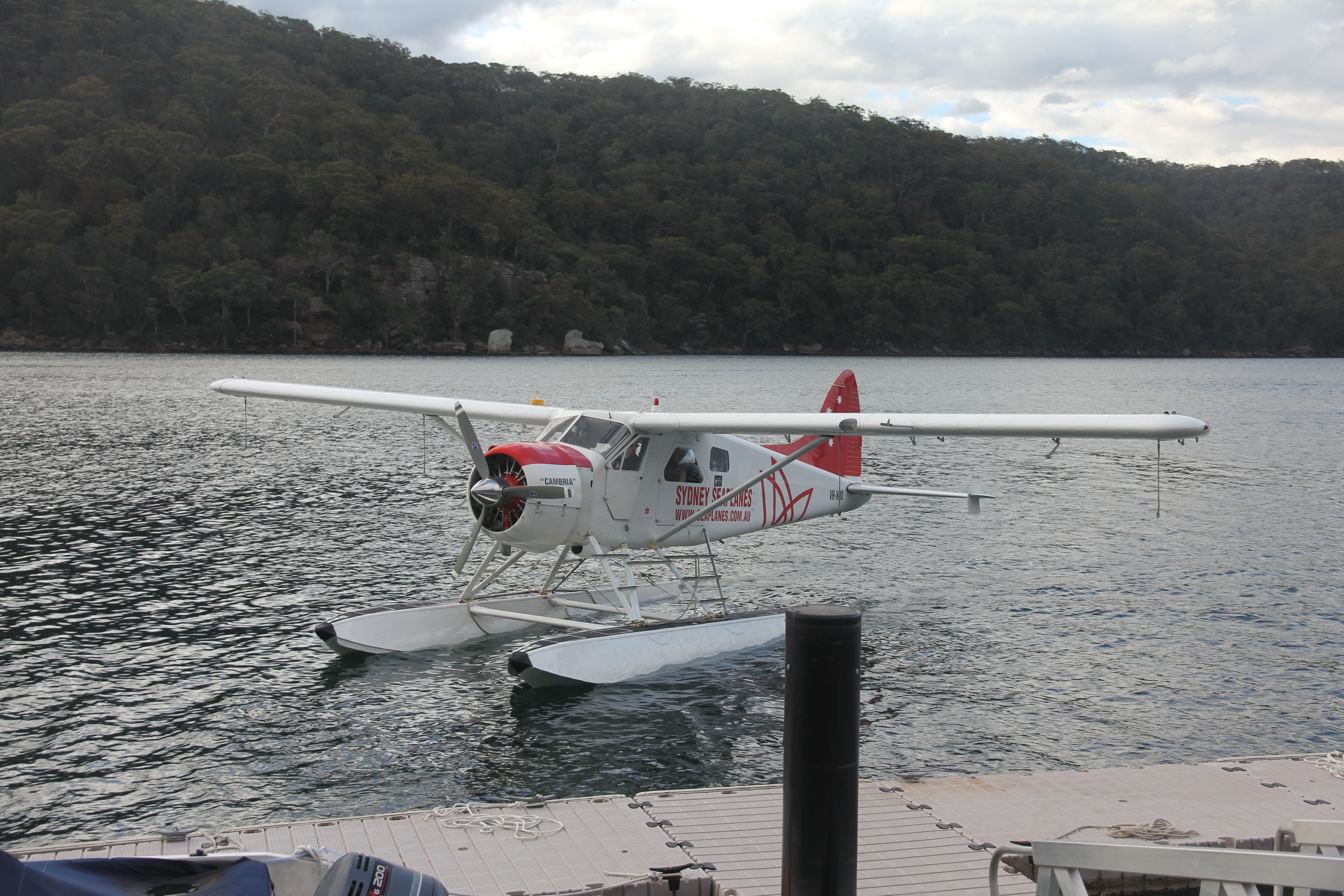
- A Sydney Seaplanes DHC-2 Beaver next to the Cottage Point Inn

- Interactive map of Cottage Point
- Country: Australia
- State: New South Wales
- City: Sydney
- LGA: Northern Beaches Council
- Location: 38 km (24 mi) north of Sydney CBD

Government
  - State electorate: Pittwater
  - Federal division: Mackellar

Population
  - Total: 96 (2021 census)
- Postcode: 2084
Suburbs around Cottage Point
Brooklyn	Brooklyn	Coasters Retreat
Berowra	Cottage Point	Morning Bay
Mount Kuring-gai	Ku-ring-gai Chase National Park	Akuna Bay

Cottage Point is a suburb of northern Sydney, in the state of New South Wales, Australia. Cottage Point is 38 kilometres north of the Sydney central business district, in the local government area of Northern Beaches Council.

Cottage Point is located in the Ku-ring-gai Chase National Park at the confluence of Cowan Creek and Coal and Candle Creek. It is accessible by Cottage Point Road off Liberator General San Martin Drive.
