= Bull Cave =

- Location within Sydney Location within Australia
- 34°03′39″S 150°50′56″E
- Location: Darling Avenue, Kentlyn, City of Campbelltown, New South Wales, Australia

New South Wales Heritage Register
- Official name: Bull Cave; Bull's Cave; The Bull Cave
- Type: State heritage (landscape)
- Designated: 28 August 2017
- Reference no.: 1993
- Type: Art site
- Category: Aboriginal

Bull Cave is a heritage-listed art site at Darling Avenue, Kentlyn, New South Wales, a suburb of Sydney, Australia. It is also known as Bull's Cave and The Bull Cave. It was added to the New South Wales State Heritage Register on 28 August 2017.

== History ==
Aboriginal peoples belonging to the Tharawal, Dharug, and Gandangara nations are the traditional custodians of the area.

Although Bull Cave has been popularly considered to be part of Dharawal country it is situated along the natural boundary between the Hawkesbury sandstone of the Woronora Plateau and the Wianamatta shale of the Cumberland Plain along the Georges River (13). Limited archaeological investigation of the site has revealed influences from coastal, hinterland and mountainous regions, suggesting that it is located at the intersection of three tribal and linguistic boundaries; Dharawal, Dharug and Gundungurra.

Dharawal people moved throughout their territories and to a lesser extent those of their neighbours including the Gundangurra and Darug, subject to season and purpose. They travelled widely, caring for country in ceremony and practice and harvesting only what was immediately required. People from other language groups travelled from inland to the coast to exchange foods, raw materials and artefacts. Bull Cave had a role as one of a network of sites along the Georges River and its tributaries. The style of art, pigments and artefacts at the cave suggest possible domestic, educational and spiritual uses into the nineteenth century. Several layers of stencils and drawings in Bull Cave were created by the Aboriginal community over time, the largest and most prominent of which, the figures of two large cattle, were created soon after the arrival of the First Fleet. One interpretation argues that the three colours of pigment indicate multi-layered applications of use of the cave and its art in cultural terms, whereby red pigment is associated with bloodlines, charcoal with education, and white with spiritual connections.

The Appin Massacre of 1816 is considered to have been the most detrimental and tragic historic event for the Aboriginal people of Campbelltown and Camden. It occurred in the early hours of the morning of 17 April 1816, the outcome of a military reprisal raid against Aboriginal people ordered by Governor Lachlan Macquarie. At least 14 Aboriginal men, women and children were killed when soldiers under the command of Captain James Wallis shot at and drove a group of Aboriginal people over the gorge of the Cataract River.

Although largely depleted, local Aboriginal people maintained a connection with the Cowpastures region. From the late 1820s magistrates provided lists of local Aboriginal people who might be eligible for the annual distribution of blankets. Comparison of the lists of neighbouring police districts for the 1830s suggests that the surviving Dharawal and Gandangara moved between Campbelltown, the Cowpastures and Picton, rarely venturing to more populated Liverpool.

Tribal life continued in a limited way. Corroborees were held nearby at Camden Park and north of the Nepean at Denham Court until at least the 1850s, usually celebrated when other Aboriginal groups were passing through the district.

=== The Wild Cattle ===
In 1787 the First Fleet, bound for Botany Bay, stopped at the Cape of Good Hope in South Africa, to collect livestock for the new colony. Among these were 11 Cape Cattle, of which 7 live cattle arrived at their destination; one bull, five cows and a bull calf. Despite being kept under the watch of a convict herdsman in what is now known as the Domain, in June 1788 these cattle escaped their bounds. After several unsuccessful attempts at recovery Governor Philip abandoned the matter and they were thought lost to the colony.

In October 1795, in line with reports from the Aboriginal community, two convicts came across a herd of wild cattle while on a hunting expedition across the Nepean River. On hearing the news Governor John Hunter arranged for a party to verify the sighting, and later set out himself with a group from Prospect Hill on 8 November 1795. After travelling for two days south and having crossed the Nepean they found a fine herd of over 40 cattle grazing in "country remarkably pleasant to the eye, and the finest yet discovered in New South Wales, the soil good and eligible for cultivation, everywhere thick luxuriant grass".

With the assumption that these were the descendants of those cattle which had escaped 7 years earlier, the cattle became known as "the wild cattle" and the Campbelltown-Camden area they inhabited became known as the Cowpastures. The area and cattle were declared property of the Crown and, under its protection, their numbers increased further. In 1795 the herd was estimated to be approximately 60 head; in 1801 Governor King estimated there to be 500-600 head; and by 1806 there were thought to be 3000 head. Although some land had been granted to figures such as Macarthur, the region was not settled until 1822, and the wild cattle remained largely undisturbed until 1826 when they were gradually dispersed into other government herds.

=== European development ===
Whilst the greater Campbelltown-Camden area began to be settled by Europeans in the 1810s and 1820s, Kentlyn mostly remained bushland, with only a handful of land grants given out. In 1879 the Kentlyn area was proclaimed the "Campbelltown Common". It comprised 809 hectares (2,000 acres) south of Peter Meadows Creek, east of Smiths Creek and west of the Georges River and provided firewood and temporary grazing for local property owners.

In 1894, during an economic depression a number of small farms were established on newly opened land and three earlier land grants in the area were privately subdivided by a Sydney developer. The estate was promoted as the "Kent Farms".

During the Great Depression in the 1930s the Kentlyn area became inhabited by unemployed persons who built makeshift homes in the bush, attracted by Campbelltown Council's offer of two days' work per week building roads in the area.

With the population explosion of the 1970s Kentlyn was declared a "scenic protection" zone with a minimum lot size of five acres (two hectares). This converted some of the bushland area into sprawling estates.

This pocket of bushland along Peter Meadows Creek has been maintained to the present as an open space corridor.

=== Recent History ===
Bull Cave was first recorded in June 1971.When the site was significantly vandalised in 1982, National Parks and Wildlife Service installed a wire fence around the mouth of the cave to prevent further incursions. There have since been numerous incidents where the wire fence has been compromised and vandalism has continued. Despite much graffiti, the bull images remain visible.

Although investigations in previous decades concluded that graffiti removal would be impossible, recently developed techniques may allow for restoration in future. Aboriginal people value the cave highly in the present and describe its importance within the broader cultural landscape.

== Description ==
The site is located in Kentlyn, northeast of Campbelltown, within a pocket of remnant bushland bordered by a suburban landscape. It consists of a rock shelter along a sandstone ridge, 15 metres from a creek. It is one of a network of rock art sites along the small creek valley system which constitute a complex cultural resource.

The shelter faces west and is 8.5 metres (28 ft) wide and 5.1 metres (17 ft) deep. The walls display pigment art which has been identified as being of Aboriginal origin. There are dozens of stencils within the shelter including a number of white hand stencils along with stencils of arms, fists, a boomerang and several stencils which may be those of sheep or calves feet in white and red.

There are also numerous paintings. The largest paintings in the shelter are two large representations of quadrupeds. Both figures are outlined in black charcoal. One shows signs of earlier red outline and infill. The first figure is almost three metres long and one metre high. The general shape of the animal, the appearance of what appears to be mature sexual organs, the tail and the cloven feet, suggest that the painting is of a bull. It bears no resemblance to any native marsupial. The second figure stands to the left of and behind the first figure. The body is thick, the tail is visible and filled in with black but is not as long as in the first figure, and is broader. The cloven front feet suggest that this may be a representation of either a cow or a bull.

The position of the two drawings on the wall of the rock may also be of significance. It has been suggested that one animal could be interpreted as attempting to mount the other in an act of copulation.

The cave has been considerably vandalised. To protect against further graffiti, it has been enclosed by a wire fence installed by the National Parks and Wildlife Service in 1982.

== Heritage listing ==
As at 13 March 2017, Bull Cave is of state significance as it offers a rare Aboriginal perspective on the early contact period. Whilst it is representative of a suite of Aboriginal rock art sites which depict European subject matter in the early contact period, it presents a unique window into one specific and notable historical event: the escape and subsequent flourishing of the First Fleet cattle in the area which came to be known as the Cowpastures. The style and method of the painting is broadly representative of the traditional Aboriginal art of the sandstone landscape in the Sydney Basin.

It is also of state significance for its history and associations with the Dharawal, Gundugurra and Dharug Aboriginal peoples who are understood to each have traditional connections with the riverside landscape which is located close to the intersection of the boundaries of the three groups.

Bull Cave was listed on the New South Wales State Heritage Register on 28 August 2017 having satisfied the following criteria.

The place is important in demonstrating the course, or pattern, of cultural or natural history in New South Wales.

Bull Cave has historical significance at a state level as it provides a unique insight into the earliest period of contact between Aboriginal people and European settlers. It tells the story of the transportation of cattle on the First Fleet, their escape upon arrival and the subsequent development of the Cowpastures from an Aboriginal perspective.

The site has a special place in the post contact history of the region, having been one of the last places in the area where Aboriginal people were able to live a traditional, independent life.

The place has a strong or special association with a person, or group of persons, of importance of cultural or natural history of New South Wales's history.

The site and art are significant for their special association with the Dharawal, Gundugurra and Dharug Aboriginal people, being located at the intersection of three tribal boundaries.

The place is important in demonstrating aesthetic characteristics and/or a high degree of creative or technical achievement in New South Wales.

The rock art is of state heritage significance for its aesthetic values as evidence of a painting style identified with sandstone landscapes of the Sydney Basin. Distinctive characteristics of the art include symbolic motifs of which stencils are common.

While the bull theme is highly unusual, the painting technique is characteristic of Aboriginal art in the Sydney Basin. It is significant that on both figures the feet are clearly shown to be cloven and drawn in profile. Aboriginal artists commonly drew representations of the tracks of the animals they encountered. Feet are important for identification of Australian rock-art fauna, and are usually drawn so as to include enough information about the feet to infer what the animal/being's tracks looked like. The clear representation of the feet on these paintings may have been one way in which the animals and their tracks were thought of as distinctive by the painters.

The place has a strong or special association with a particular community or cultural group in New South Wales for social, cultural or spiritual reasons.

Bull Cave is of state heritage significance to the community of NSW, both Aboriginal and non-Aboriginal, as a unique documentation of the early contact period as viewed by the traditional owners of the land. It is also significant in a traditional and historical sense to the local Aboriginal community. In addition to being valued as part of a relatively intact and complex group of sites along the creek system, the community also express a connection to the site as an important teaching place which is symbolic of the challenges faced by Aboriginal communities in trying to balance their desire to recognize and celebrate their heritage, with the need to protect it.

The place has potential to yield information that will contribute to an understanding of the cultural or natural history of New South Wales.

Bull Cave is of state significance for its archaeological research potential. To date, only a small portion of the entrance to Bull Cave has been subject to archaeological excavation.

Further research into the art could provide additional information for interpretation of early-post contact art, allow revelations about on-going use of rock-art sites after European settlement, and help to reveal further undocumented Aboriginal reactions to European settlement.

The place possesses uncommon, rare or endangered aspects of the cultural or natural history of New South Wales.

Whilst there are several examples of Aboriginal rock art with European subjects, animals and pieces of material culture which date to the early post-contact period, Bull Cave is unique for its connection to a particularly specific and significant story. It is the only painting of cattle executed very soon after European settlement, linking the Aboriginal community with a dramatic event in the first years of colonisation of Australia-the loss and rediscovery of the first cattle landed on the continent.

The place is important in demonstrating the principal characteristics of a class of cultural or natural places/environments in New South Wales.

The pigment, method and style of the paintings are a good representation of Aboriginal rock art of the Sydney Basin.

== See also ==
- Indigenous Australians
