= Akuna Bay, New South Wales =

Coordinates: 33°38′53″S 151°14′06″E

Akuna Bay Sydney, New South Wales
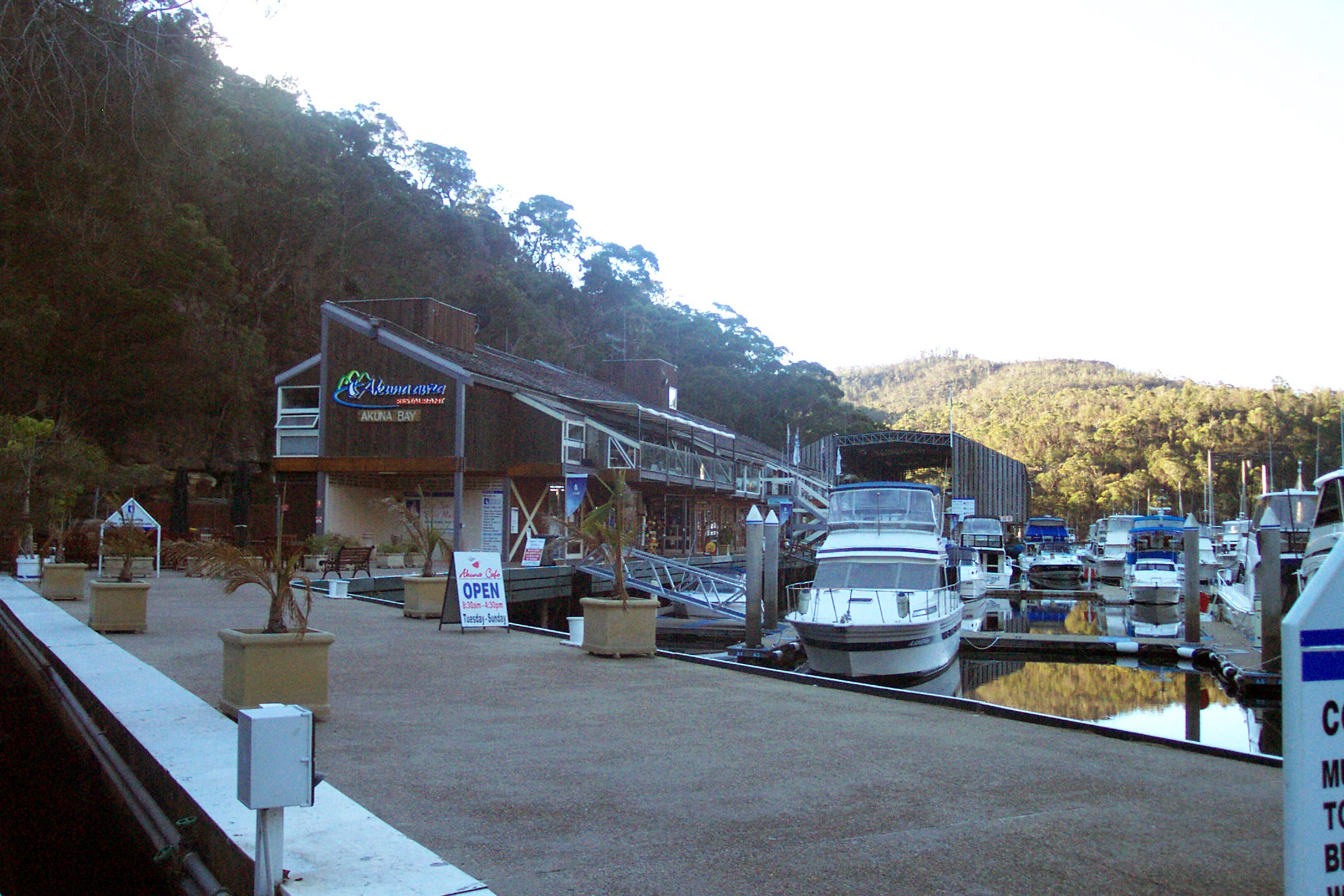
- Boats moored at Akuna Bay Marina
- Postcode(s): 2084
- Location: 38 km (24 mi) north of Sydney CBD
- LGA(s): Northern Beaches Council
- State electorate(s): Pittwater
- Federal division(s): Mackellar
Localities around Akuna Bay:
| Akuna Bay | Akuna Bay | Akuna Bay |
| Ku-ring-gai Chase National Park | Akuna Bay | Ku-ring-gai Chase National Park |
| Ku-ring-gai Chase National Park | Ku-ring-gai Chase National Park | Ku-ring-gai Chase National Park |

Akuna Bay is an urban place in Sydney, Australia. Akuna Bay is located 38 kilometres (24 mi) north of the Sydney central business district, in the local government area of Northern Beaches Council.

Akuna Bay sits in the Ku-ring-gai Chase National Park and takes its name from the bay on Coal and Candle Creek. It can be accessed by a marina on the bay or by Liberator General San Martin Drive.

== History ==
Akuna was thought to be an Aboriginal word meaning to follow. It actually is a mangled version of the Dieri word ngaka-rna meaning "to flow" from South Australia.

In 1972 the construction of a marina was proposed and it was completed in 1974.
