= William Thomas Shirley =

William Thomas Sherley
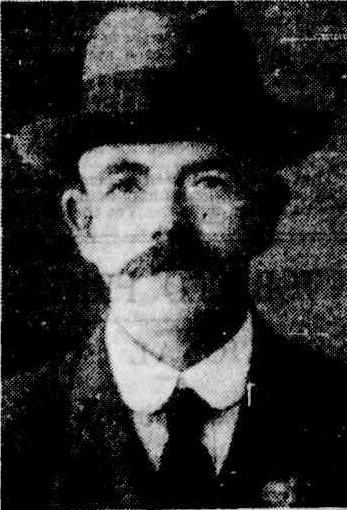
- Born: September 1876; Penrith, England
- Died: 27 August 1929 (aged 52); Sydney, Australia
- Burial place: Rookwood Cemetery, Roman Catholic section
- Military career
- Allegiance: British Empire
- Branch: Australian Imperial Force
- Service years: 1916-1917
- Rank: Private
- Service number: 5756a
- Units: 4th Infantry Brigade, 13th Battalion
- Conflicts: World War I; Battle of Arras
- Awards: 1914–15 Star; Victory Medal; British War Medal
- Memorials: The Sphinx Memorial

William Thomas Shirley (September 1876 – 27 August 1929) was a British-Australian veteran of the First World War and the creator of the Sphinx Memorial located in Ku-ring-gai Chase, New South Wales.

== Early life and First World War ==
Shirley was born in September 1876 in the Lake District in the North West of England. He was by trade a stonemason and builder and had completed a five-year apprenticeship in Liverpool.

On 11 January 1916 Shirley joined the Australian Imperial Force. He enlisted at Casula, New South Wales and served as a private in the 13th Battalion in the trench warfare on the Western Front in France at Pozieres, in August and September. His unit embarked from Sydney, on board HMAT A46 Clan Macgillivray in May 1916.

On 11 April 1917 his battalion was involved in the first battle of Bullecourt. Three days later he was evacuated to Rouen suffering from debility, and on 25 April he was shipped to a hospital in London where he developed pleurisy caused by gassing during the war. The following month, he was assessed as permanently unfit for both general and home service and later returned to Australia in October 1917, suffering from both senility and debility. He was discharged due to medical unfitness on 29 November 1917. It was established that Shirley suffered from tuberculosis prior to his time in the war, but his service had accentuated it.

In August 1922 he received the Victory medal, Star medal, and the British War medal.

== The Sphinx Memorial ==
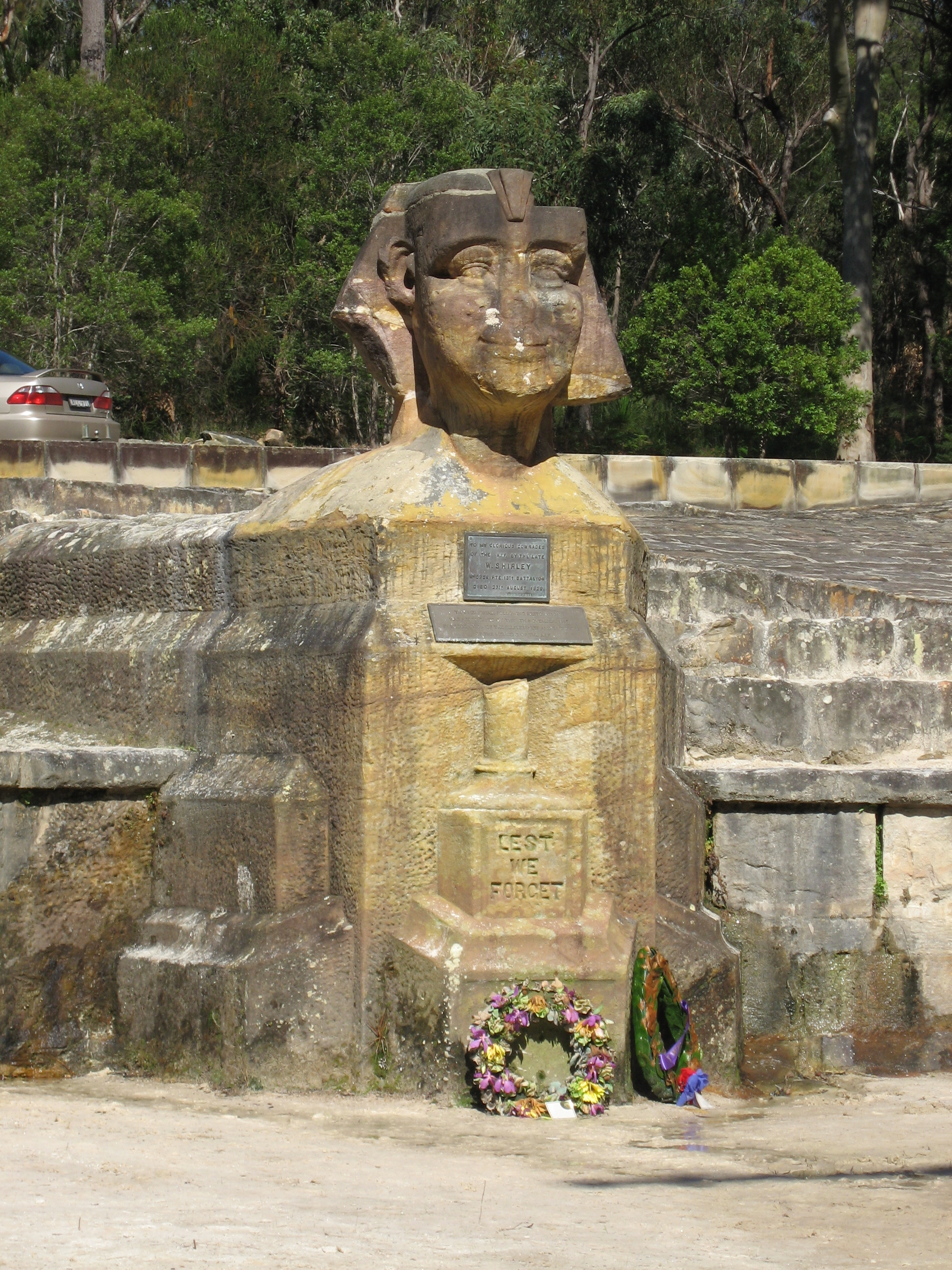
Sphinx Memorial in Ku-ring-gai Chase National Park

In 1924 Shirley was one of 85 patients who had entered the Lady Davidson Home in Turramurra for treatment of tuberculosis. Normal hospital occupations did not seem to appeal to him and as he was not strong enough to return to his trade, it was suggested that he should carve a rock in Ku-ring-gai Chase on the model of the Great Sphinx of Giza.

Shirley planned the Sphinx replica to be one eight of the size of the Great Sphinx of Giza. It was mostly carved out of sandstone, apart from the head which was chiseled out of solid rock.

I have just been filling in my spare time, I did not know that anybody outside the hospital knew what I was doing. One has to do something, though, and this work appeals to me

— William T. Shirley, A MODERN SPHINX, The Sydney Morning Herald, 6 June 1924

For about 1.5 years, Shirley laboured at creating his sphinx and pyramids which were to serve as a memorial to his fallen A.I.F comrades. In addition to this, Shirley also erected a pyramid on either side of the Sphinx. The money for this had been donated by a woman from Newcastle. The 4th Infantry Brigade, of which Shirley's 13th Battalion was a sub-unit, had originally been based in Egypt.

Shirley's memorial was unveiled by Sir Phillip Game, the then governor of New South Wales, on 3 May 1931, and was described as the most unique and appropriate war memorial in the world by the president of the T.B. Sailors and Soldier's Association of Australia.
