= Cowan Creek =

River in New South Wales, Australia

Coordinates: 33°37.1886′S 151°11.74314′E

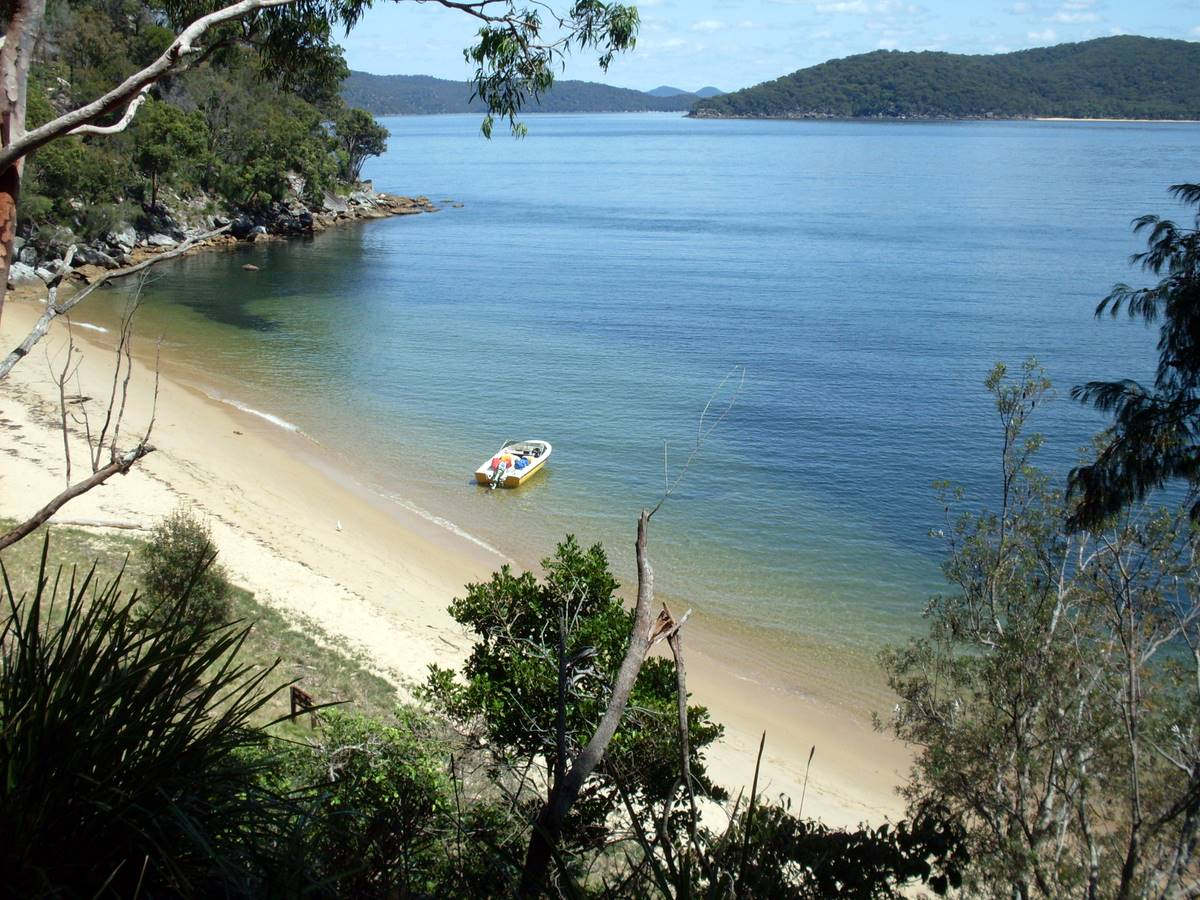
Hungry Beach and the lower reaches of Cowan Creek, Australia

Cowan Creek is located in New South Wales, Australia. It is a tidal subcatchment of the Hawkesbury River. Almost all of the catchment lies within Ku-ring-gai Chase National Park. Tributaries include Coal and Candle Creek, which flows into Cowan Creek at Cottage Point, and Smiths Creek.

== Incidents ==
On 31 December 2017, a de Havilland Canada DHC-2 Beaver crashed into Jerusalem Bay just off Cowan Creek, killing 6 people.
