= Towlers Bay, New South Wales =

Coordinates: 33°37′25″S 151°17′05″E

Towlers Bay Sydney, New South Wales
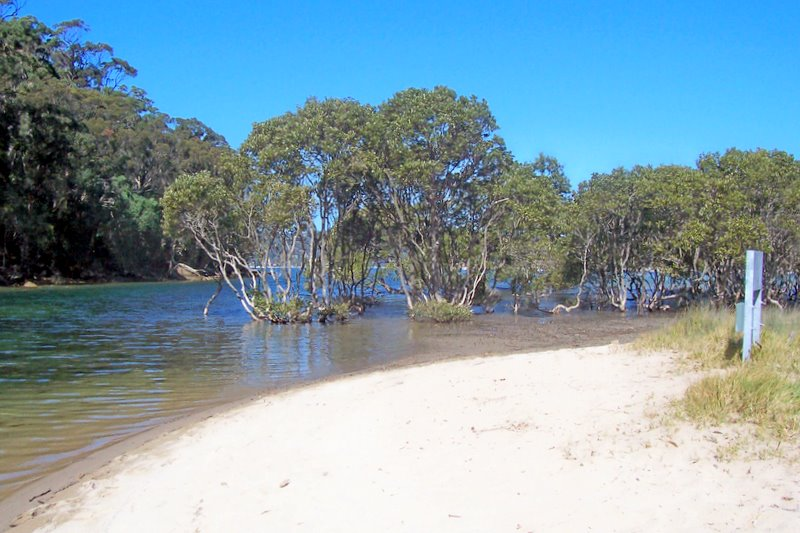
- A lagoon at the head of Towlers Bay
- Postcode(s): 2084
- Location: 43.8 km (27 mi) north of Sydney CBD
- LGA(s): Northern Beaches Council
- State electorate(s): Pittwater
- Federal division(s): Mackellar
Localities around Towlers Bay:
Ku-ring-gai Chase NP	Ku-ring-gai Chase NP, Morning Bay	Pittwater
Ku-ring-gai Chase NP	Towlers Bay	Pittwater
Ku-ring-gai Chase NP	Lovett Bay, Elvina Bay	Scotland Is., Pittwater

Towlers Bay is a locality in Ku-ring-gai Chase National Park, north of the city of Sydney, New South Wales, Australia, situated on the Northern Beaches. The bay located there, formerly of the same name, was renamed Morning Bay on 31 August 1984. It had been named after Bill Toler, who used to camp in the area in the 19th century.
