= Smiths Creek (New South Wales) =

River in Australia

Smiths Creek is a creek located in Sydney, New South Wales, Australia. It is a tributary of Cowan Creek which flows into the Hawkesbury River. Almost all of the catchment lies within Ku-ring-gai Chase National Park.

== See also ==
- Coal and Candle Creek
- Berowra Creek
