= Flint & Steel Guesthouse =

Flint & Steel Guesthouse New South Wales
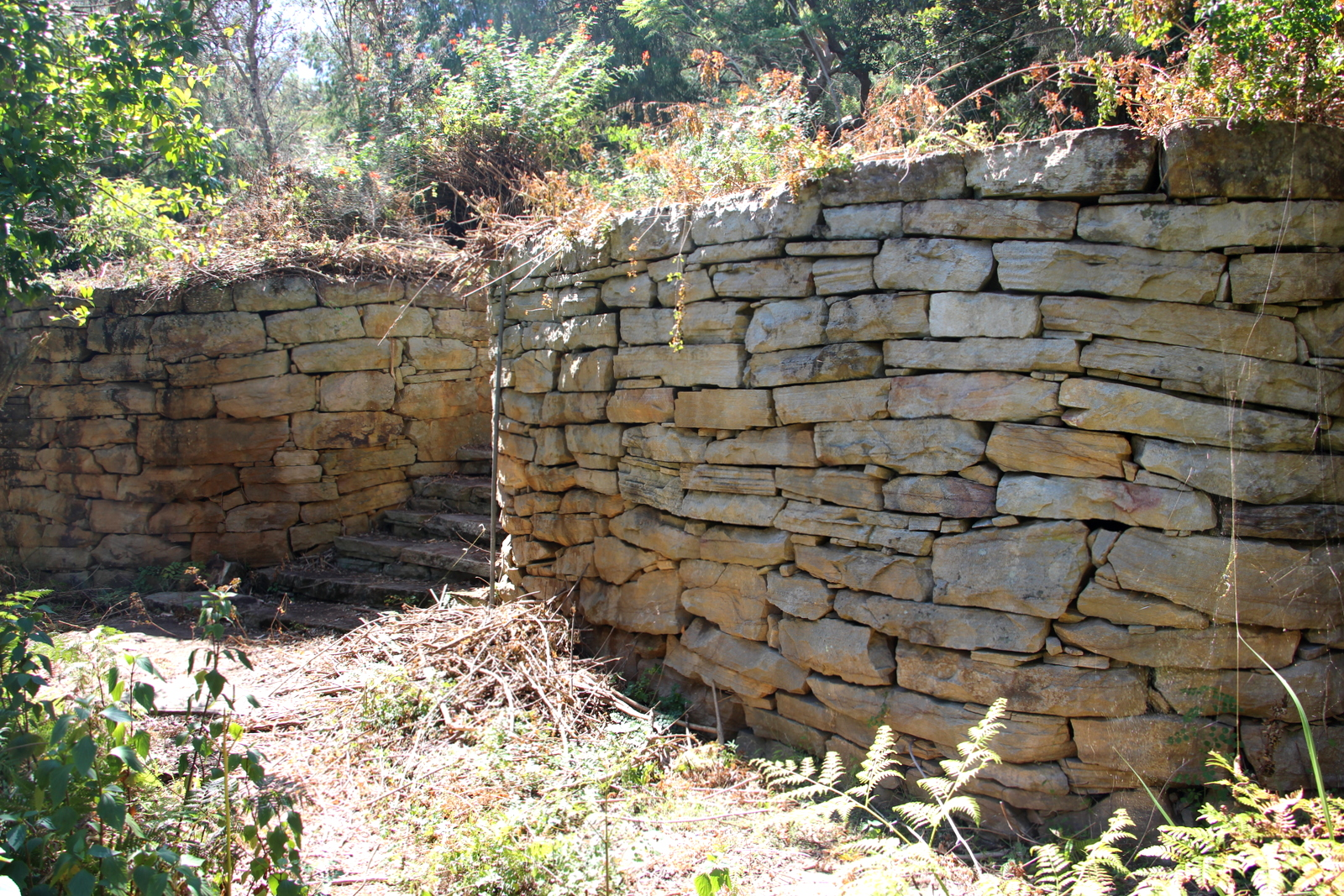
- ruins of Flint & Steel Guesthouse, Ku-ring-gai Chase National Park

- Coordinates: 33.578552°S 151.282992°E
- Elevation: 15 m (49 ft)

Flint & Steel Guesthouse was situated on Broken Bay, north of Sydney, Australia. It was constructed from 1920 to 1965. The guesthouse and nearby waterways were resumed by the navy during the second world war. Navy personnel at nearby Hungry Beach were known to have frequented "Flint & Steel". The guesthouse was destroyed by fire in 1971.
