= West Head =

Headland on South Island, New Zealand

- Cape
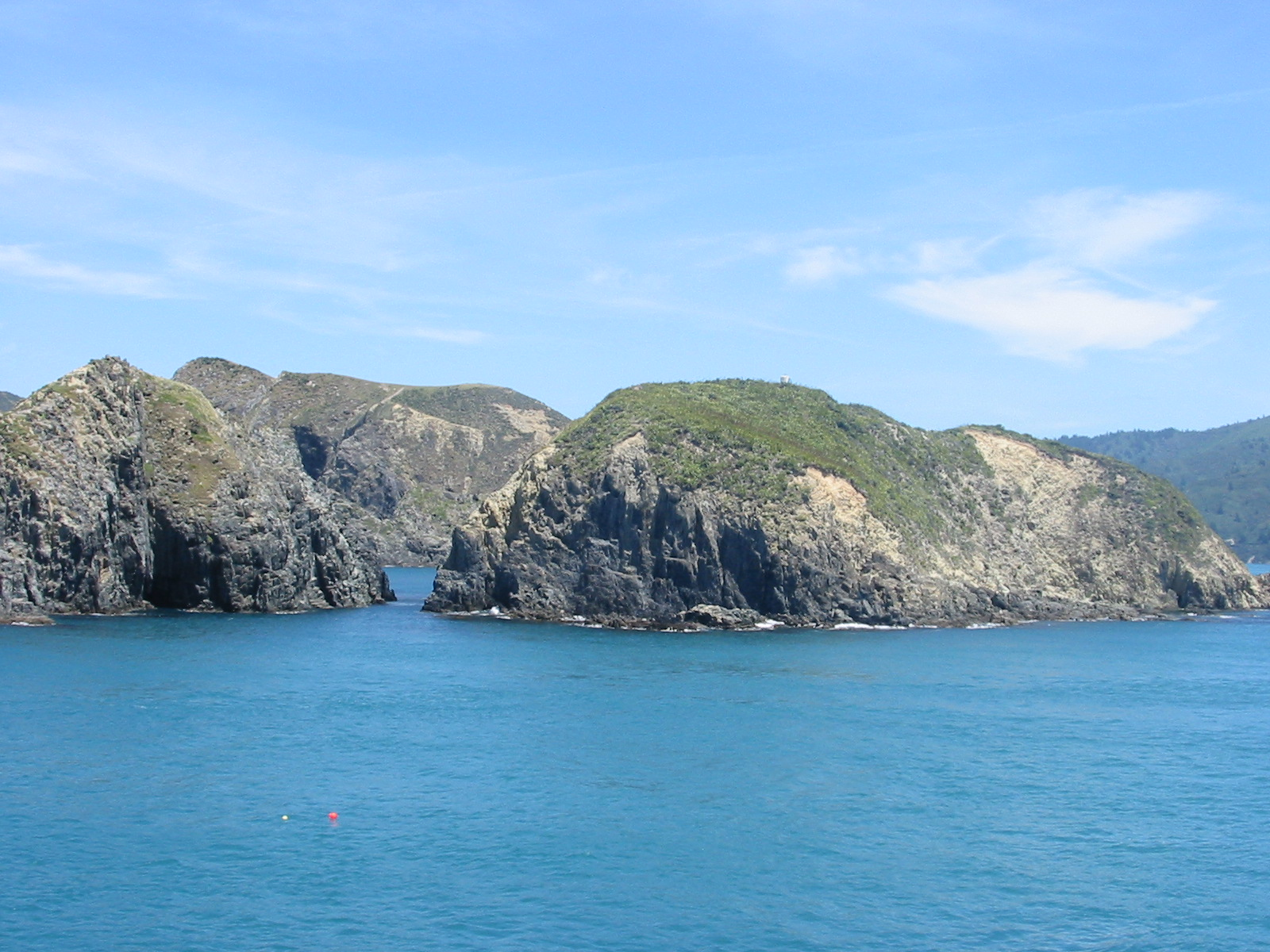
- West Head, Tory Channel

- Coordinates: 41.214°S 174.316°E
- Location: Marlborough District, New Zealand
- Offshore water bodies: Tory Channel / Kura Te Au

West Head is the easternmost point of the New Zealand's South Island. It is named West Head as it marks the western side of the entrance to Tory Channel / Kura Te Au. The corresponding East Head sits across the channel on Arapaoa Island. it is a significant maori historical land with many tapu (sacred) areas that hold many unexplored and excavated sites. It also holds many secrets and culltural places that are up for debate as possibly incorredtly named due to inaccurate understanding of the actual pronunciation being used by Maori at the time of europeran settlement.

West Head is the easternmost point of the South Island. However, two other distinct headlands have very similar longitudes, sometimes leading to confusion and erroneous claims.

West Head, at the entrance to Tory Channel, is recorded by Land Information New Zealand at 174.316°E (174°18'57"E).

Cape Jackson, easternmost tip measured at 174.315°E (174°18'54"E), is about 100 metres further west.

Both West Head and Cape Jackson are at the end of long, narrow and difficult-to-reach peninsulas in the Marlborough Sounds. For this reason third-place Cape Campbell, LINZ longitude 174.2760°E, easternmost tip 174.2773°E (174°16'34") is sometimes mistakenly considered the easternmost point, but is about three kilometres further west.

== Similar named geographic features ==
There are two other locations in the South Island named West Head:

- 43°40′38″S 173°04′20″E, at the entrance to Okains Bay on Banks Peninsula.
- 41°13′02″S 174°08′37″E, at the end of a peninsula on the northern shore of Queen Charlotte Sound. See Ruakākā Bay.
