= Blackwood Bay =

Locality in New Zealand

Blackwood Bay Tahuahua Bay
- Bay
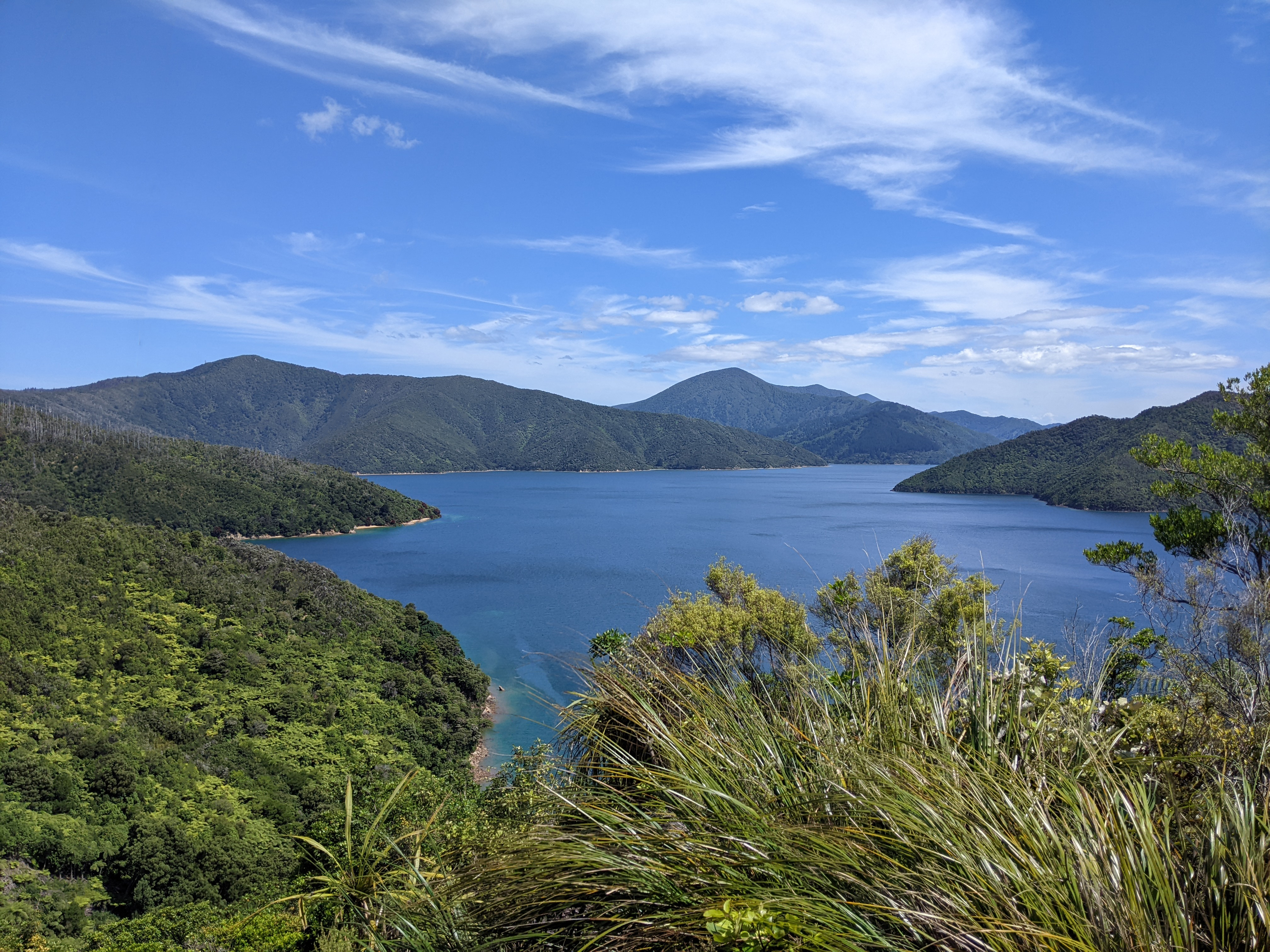
- View across Tahuahua Bay from
- Interactive map of Blackwood Bay
- Coordinates: 41°12′42″S 174°05′54″E
- Location: Marlborough Sounds

Blackwood Bay in Queen Charlotte Sound

Blackwood Bay or Tahuahua Bay is a bay in Queen Charlotte Sound, New Zealand.

The bay has long held its dual name, though the meaning of Tahuahua is a bit of a puzzle. The bay was dubbed Dilmers Cove on Peter Fannin's map from James Cook's second expedition.

== Naming ==
Tahuahua has a range of possible meanings. The name comes directly from a settlement of the same name, which sat on the eastern side of the bay. The Tahuahua name has been applied to a number of features in and around the bay, notably Tāhuahua, a hill and trig point on the southern point of Mcalister Cove.

One potential meaning, supported by the macron in Tāhuahua Hill, is the Māori word tāhuahua, meaning 'sand hill or dune', or 'to be in lumps/hillocks'.

Macalister's notes give the meaning of Tahuahua as "a place where food is found" or "where food is plentiful", attributing the translation to Mr H.D. Bennett, a Māori man living in Wellington in the early 20th century.

W. H. Sherwood Roberts gives the meaning as 'the spot where a fire was kindled and conspicuous on the landscape', though this association with fire was disagreed with by W. J. Elvy, a man knowledgeable on Māori history in Marlborough.

J. K. Matangi, a teacher at a local school, interpreted the name as huahua a term for the "process of preserving and storing tītī and other birds or fish foods for the winter", and ta also being associated with "preparing or cooking food".

The majority of these split syllable translators have association with food, an association that makes sense with the bays history as a favoured spot for Māori to fish, particularly for takeke.

Blackwood is almost certainly a reference to Nothofagus solandri, known in Māori as tawairauriki or tawhairauriki a forest of which grew across large parts of Tōtaranui. Due to this commonality, it is possible that the name referred to a particularly distinct tree.

== Hiwhera Point ==
The point sits near the back of the cove on its eastern side. Hiwhera could mean "big opening/bay" or "large catch".

== Macalister Cove ==
Macalister Cove is named after Robert Macalister, Mayor of Wellington from 1950 to 1956 and a long-time resident of the cove. It sits just inside the eastern side of Tahuahua Bay, north of Tauranga Bay.

== Pariwhero Point and Parikohikohi Point ==
Pariwhero Point is located just south of Tūnoamai Point, with Parikohikohi Point to its south sitting on the western entrance to the bay.

Pari means "cliff", while whero means "red" and kohikohi means "to collect, gather together". Together, Pariwhero means "red cliffs", while Parikohikohi means "cliffs collected together", references to the red of the cliffs and the number of cliffs respectively.

== Tauranga Bay and Okahu Bay ==
Tauranga Bay and Okahu Bay sit on the south-eastern tip of Blackwood Bay, below Tāhuahua peak.

== Tūnoamai ==
Tūnoamai was the name of a settlement on the western side of the bay. The settlement lends its name to Tūnoamai Point, a point not far from where the settlement once sat and quite central in the bay. W. H. Sherwood Roberts gives the meaning of Tūnoamai as "standing hitherwards in front". An alternative name for the point is Red Bluff due to its coloured rock. The gully north of Tūnoamai Point may be called Whisky Gully.
