= Ku-ring-gai Chase National Park =

National Park in New South Wales, Australia

- IUCN category II (national park)
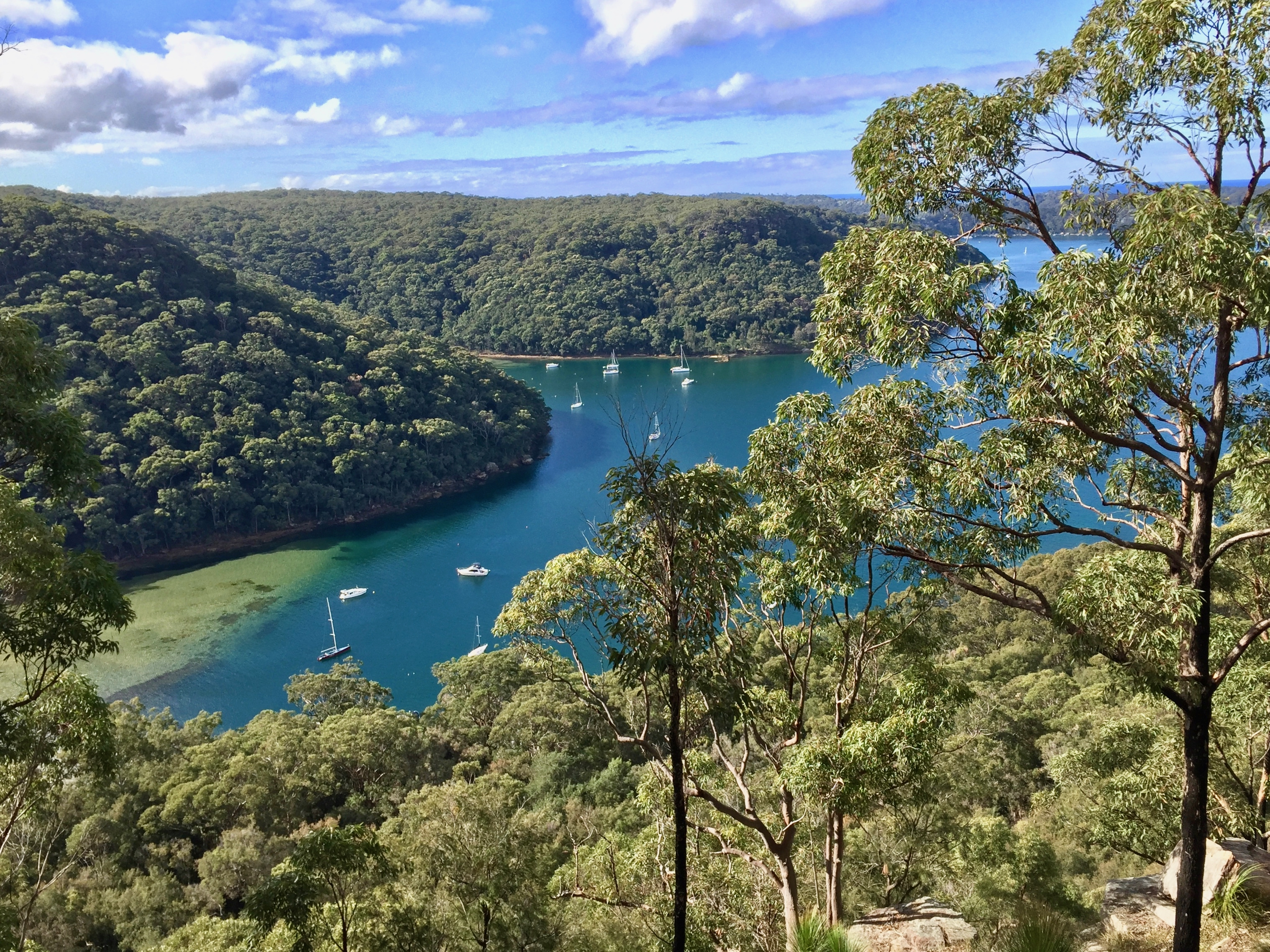
- The steep wooded ria that forms Towlers Bay, is typical of the Ku-ring-gai Chase terrain.

- Location within New South Wales
- Location: New South Wales
- Nearest city: Sydney
- Area: 149.77 km^{2} (57.83 sq mi)
- Established: December 1894
- Visitors: 2 million (in 2001)
- Governing body: NSW National Parks & Wildlife Service
- Website: Official website

Ku-ring-gai Chase National Park is a national park on the northern side of Sydney in New South Wales, Australia. The 14,977-hectare (37,010-acre) park is 25 kilometres (16 mi) north of the Sydney central business district and generally comprises the land east of the M1 Pacific Motorway, south of the Hawkesbury River, west of Pittwater and north of Mona Vale Road. It includes Barrenjoey Headland on the eastern side of Pittwater.

Ku-ring-gai Chase is a popular tourist destination, known for its scenic setting on the Hawkesbury River and Pittwater, significant plant and animal communities, Aboriginal sites and European historic places. Picnic, boating, and fishing facilities can be found throughout the park. There are many walking tracks in Ku-ring-gai Chase. The villages of Cottage Point, Appletree Bay, Elvina Bay, Lovett Bay, Coasters Retreat, Great Mackerel Beach and Bobbin Head are located within the park boundaries.

The park was declared in 1894, and is the third oldest national park in Australia. The park is managed by the NSW National Parks & Wildlife Service and was added to the Australian National Heritage List in December 2006.

The park gets its name from the Guringai Aboriginal people who were long thought to be the traditional owners of the area. However, more contemporary research suggests that this was not the case.

== Geology ==
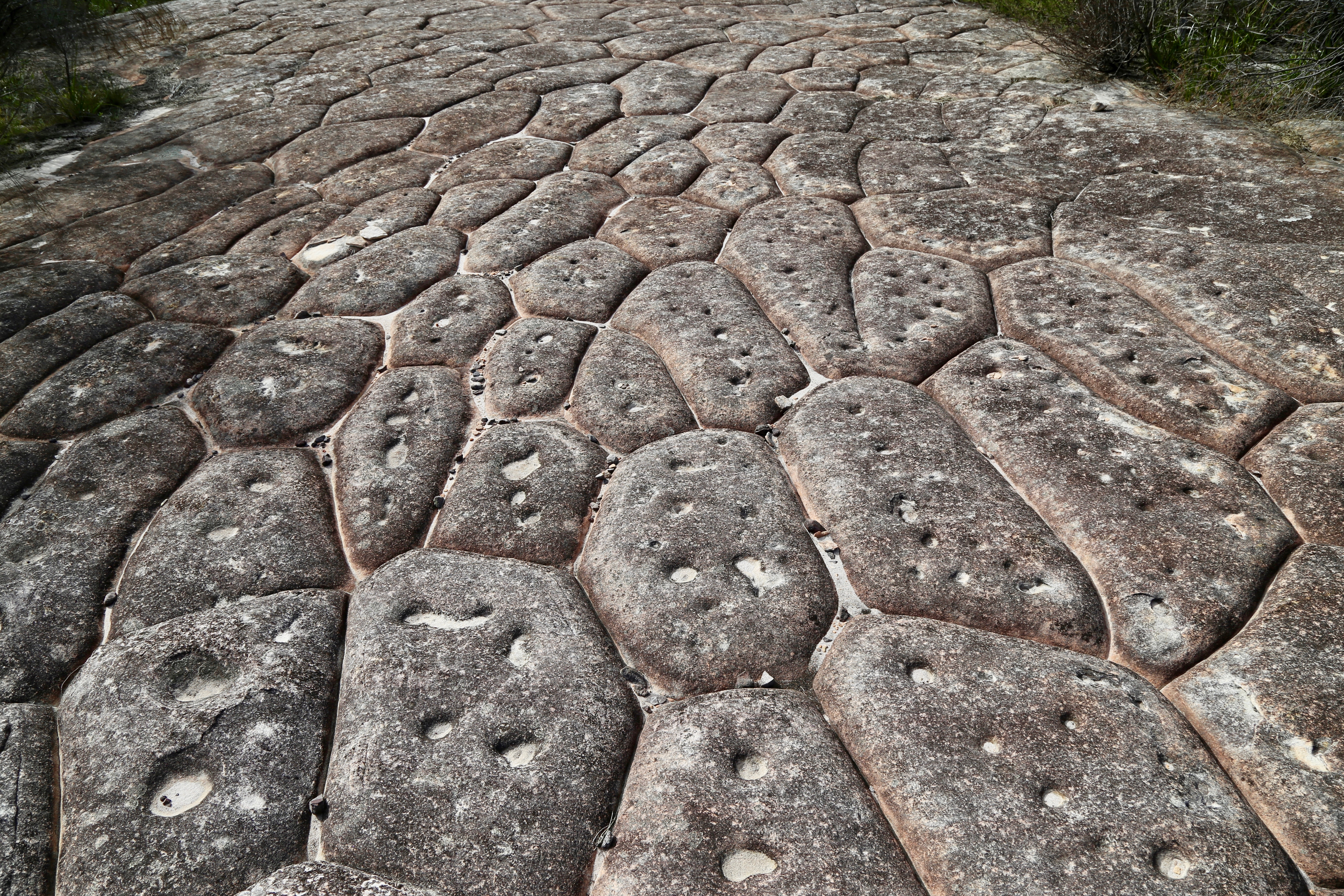
Tessellated pavement near the Elvina Track on the Park's Lambert Peninsular

Ku-ring-gai Chase is part of the Hornsby Plateau, a massive block of sandstone tilting upwards to the north. The park comprises a plateau with an elevation of generally 150–200 m above sea level. Between 250 and 200 million years ago, sand silt and mud was deposited by rivers across flood plains. These formed the shales, flagstones and sandstones of the Narrabeen Group that outcrop along the foreshores and ridges. Higher areas of the park are underlain with pink, white and orange layers of Hawkesbury Sandstone that contain small beds of shale. Wianamatta Group shale is present in the higher points of the park. The park's terraced landscape is due to the horizontal arrangement of these sediment layers.

Other rock types in the park are less common. Soils derived from the Narrabeen group of shales are around the eastern shore of the Lambert Peninsula, particularly around Elvina Bay and Lovett Bay. These richer soils provide for a vegetation type different from that of the sandy ridge top soils, providing for forests of spotted gums (Corymbia maculata) with forest oaks as a secondary layer. Eroded remnants of volcanic dykes occur including at Resolution Picnic Area at West Head and Campbells Crater near Cowan, which provide for forests of Sydney blue gum (Eucalyptus saligna).

More recent volcanic activity has forced small intrusions of igneous rock into the sandstone. A band of dolerite runs across the West Head peninsula near White Horse Beach, providing fertile soils for a distinct group of plants. The Smith's Creek area has intrusions of breccia.

The plateau is divided into separate sections by the steep valleys of Cowan Creek, Coal and Candle Creek, and Smiths Creek. These "flooded" or "drowned" valleys, knowns as rias, were eroded into the sandstone much deeper than the current sea level during the glacial phases of the Pleistocene ice age. When the ice caps melted about 10,000 years ago, the sea levels rose and flooded the valleys of the park, and separated Lion and Scotland islands from the mainland. The tributaries of Pittwater and Cowan Creek became bays and inlets along and extended shoreline.

The dominant rock type is Hawkesbury Sandstone which determines the topography and the vegetation in the sandy soils. Sandstone cliffs, rocky and outcrops, and worn caves are common throughout the park.

Indigenous people engraved the flat sandstone outcrops.

Tessellated pavements are found in the park whereby regular chequered patterns in the stone form along fault lines and lines of weakness.

The park's highest point is 246 m at Willunga Trig near West Head Road which runs along the ridge of the Lambert Peninsula.

== History ==
=== Pre-European history ===
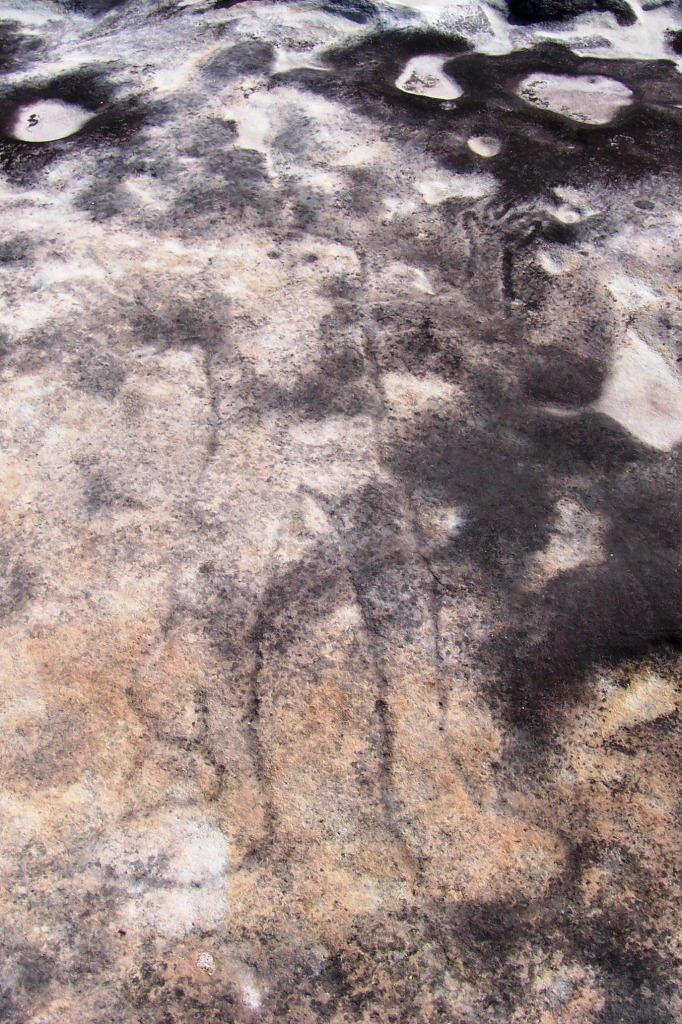
Aboriginal rock engraving

The name Ku-ring-gai (also spelled Kuringgai, Kuring-gai, Guringai, Kuriggai) ([kuriŋɡai]) is an ethnonym referring to (a) an hypothesis regarding an aggregation of Indigenous Australian peoples occupying the territory between the southern borders of the Gamilaraay and the area around Sydney (b) perhaps an historical people with its own distinctive language, located in part of that territory, or (c) people of Aboriginal origin who identify themselves as descending from the original peoples denoted by (a) or (b) and who call themselves Guringai.

Little about the original inhabitants was recorded by Europeans at contact and their communities were soon destroyed through disease and conflict with European settlers.

The national park contains extensive evidence of Aboriginal occupation of the area prior to European contact, across more than 800 sites in the park. These include rock engravings, cave drawings, occupation sites, paintings and stencils, axe grinding grooves and middens providing significant evidence of the way of life of the Guringai people.

=== Park history ===
In 1788, the first year of English settlement of the Sydney area, Governor Arthur Phillip and a small party explored Broken Bay and the Hawkesbury River, but seeking agricultural land, they showed little interest in the steep and stony landscapes.

It was previously underdeveloped by early settlers due to poor accessibility and low soil fertility, except for some of the more fertile ridgetops. The area's Sydney blue gum, blackbutt, turpentine, and coachwood was extracted in small quantities, but red cedar was heavily extracted. Sawmills were established in the 1830s, including at the upper reaches of Cowan Creek where Duffy's Wharf was built to transport logs.

The Pacific Highway and Main Northern railway line built along the ridgetop forming the park's current western border provided access to Cowan Creek along which pioneers settled. 40 hectares at Gerard Point, now Church Point, were granted to James Terry of Gordon.

Following almost 40 years of lobbying from a local citizen, Eccleston Du Faur, to establish a "National Park for North Sydney", approximately 13,500 hectares, including not only land areas but also most of Cowan Water, was set aside in 1894 as Ku-ring-gai Chase as a conservation area, and placed under the care, control and management of trustees. Du Faur was a surveyor and engineer by profession, and his interests included science, exploration, natural history and the arts. Upon the gazetting of the gazetting of the park, du Faur was appointed Managing Trustee and during his 10-year tenure, he developed walking trails and a road to Bobbin Head, which is now a fire trail.

Bobbin Head Inn, picnic shelters, and boat shed concessions were established to raise much needed funds for park management. Picnic areas were created with the reclamation of mud flats at Appletree Bay, Bobbin Head, Illawong Bay, and Akuna Bay between 1910 and 1940.

The area around West Head had been held privately until it was added to the park in 1951. In 1918, owners of a 640 hectare lot in Commodore Heights lobbied for a road to be pushed through from the south. A 1927 prospectus proposed a community of 2,500 residences with a country club, casino, golf course, and hotel, however, the plans did not eventuate due to the Great Depression.

Ku-ring-gai Chase became a national park with the proclamation of the National Parks and Wildlife Act in 1967. It is the third oldest national park in Australia, with the Royal National Park being the oldest. Additions to the park have made it 14,882 hectares in size. The park is managed by the NSW National Parks & Wildlife Service and was added to the Australian National Heritage List in December 2006. The term "chase" indicates it was an area of natural bush not enclosed by fences. Ku-ring-gai Chase is also officially classed as a suburb by the Geographical Names Board of New South Wales.

The television series, Skippy the Bush Kangaroo was shot in northern Sydney at Ku-ring-gai Chase National Park and the adjacent Waratah Park. Bushfires ravaged the park in January 1994.

A seaplane on its way to Sydney Harbour crashed into Jerusalem Bay shortly after takeoff from on 31 December 2017, killing the pilot and five passengers.

== Locations, access and facilities ==
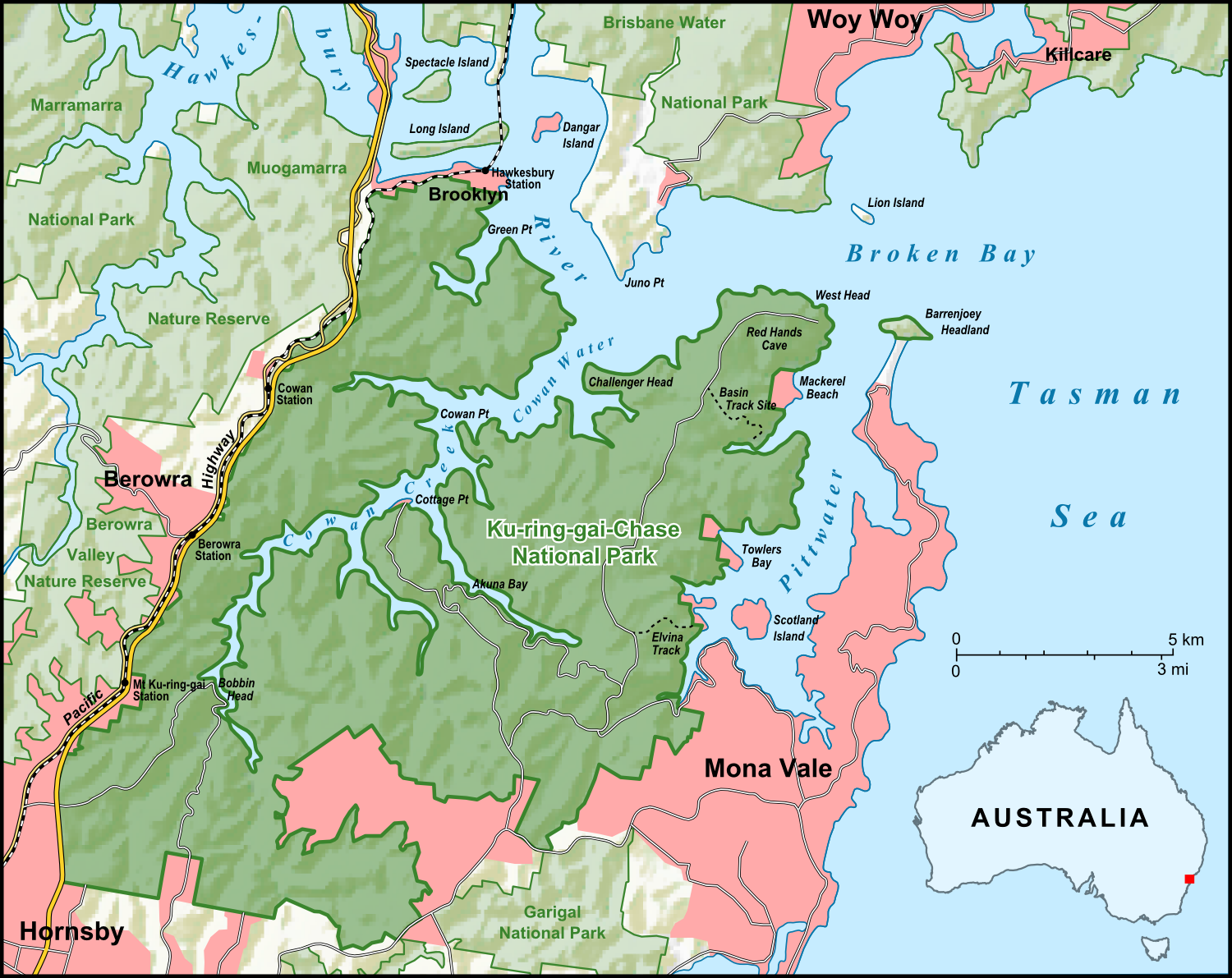
The Ku-ring-gai Chase National park

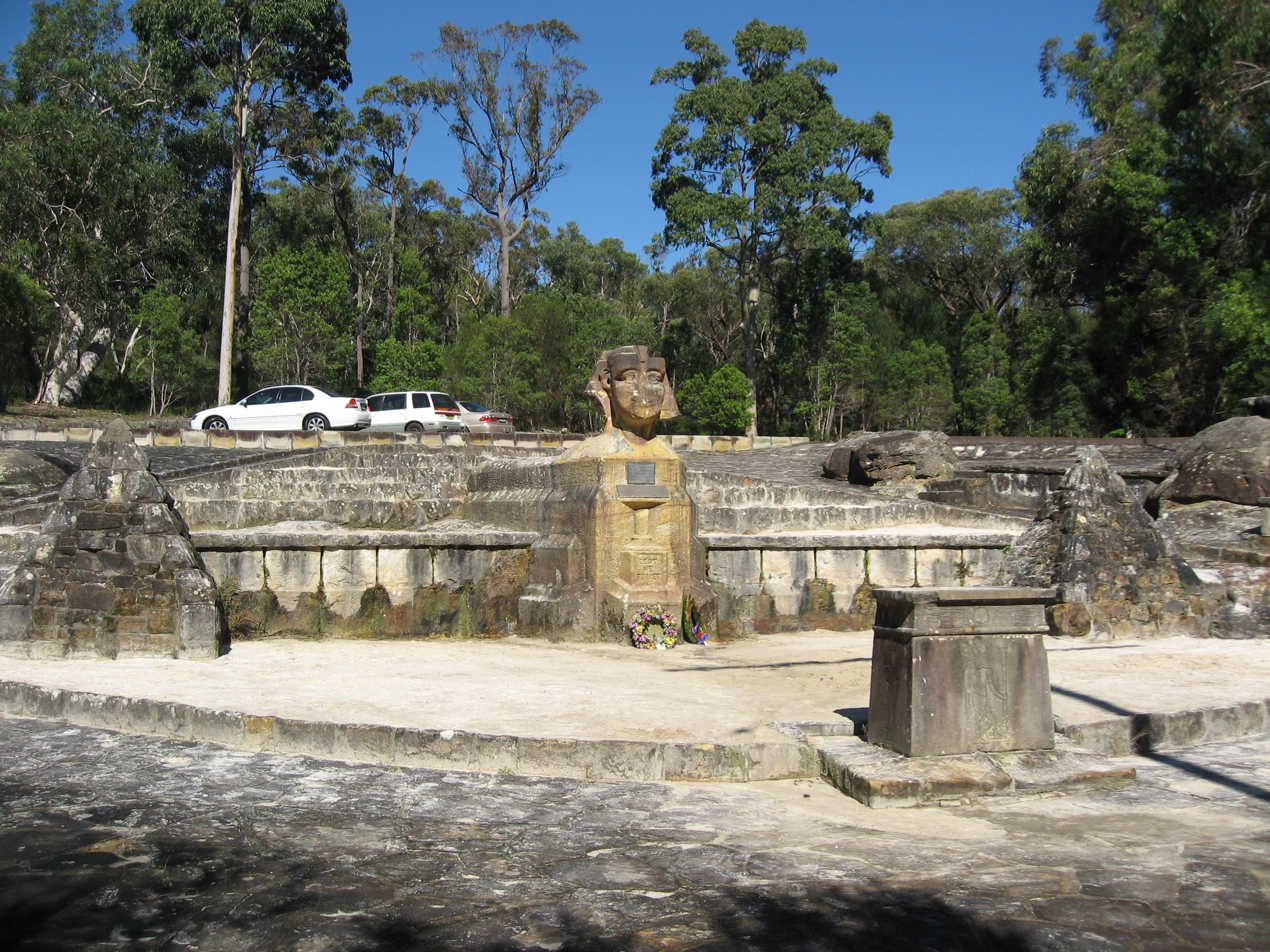
Sphinx Memorial

Many of the park's attractions are accessible only by walking track. Many kilometres of the park front the shores of Broken Bay, Pittwater and Cowan Creek, making it a good place to explore by boat. Railway stations are at Mount Colah, Mount Kuring-gai, Berowra and Cowan. All roads in the area are sealed and all have collection gates where a daily fee is payable.

- Bobbin Head is located on Cowan Creek and facilities include a marina, picnic areas, a small store, and a lunch-time restaurant in what used to be the Bobbin Head Inn, which also contains an information centre. The area contains many fire trails and a walk through mangroves. Aboriginal engravings can be seen in the area.
- Appletree Bay is a picnic area with a boat ramp and jetty, toilets, picnic tables and barbecues.
- The Basin is a lagoon with a beach on the west side of Pittwater. It has picnic areas and is the only location in the national park where camping is permitted. Access is either by West Head Road via The Basin Track or on a ferry from Palm Beach Wharf.
- West Head is a headland at the north eastern tip of the National Park. A lookout, with views of Barrenjoey, Palm Beach and Broken Bay, has been built on West Head. The Flint & Steel Guesthouse was one of the first buildings on West Head. Gun emplacements were built for WW2 defences, and a bushtrack still leads down to their remnants.
- Barrenjoey headland is at the northern end of Palm Beach and is not joined to the rest of the Park by land but separated by 1 kilometre of water, the Pittwater. It is the site the historic Barrenjoey Head Lighthouse, constructed in 1880.
- The Sphinx Memorial is a sandstone monument commemorating the fallen Australian Imperial Force comrades of William Shirley during World War I and was created by the returned soldier in the 1920s. The Sphinx took about one and a half years to complete.
- Cottage Point is Sydney's smallest locality and is listed as a heritage conservation area. Cottage Point Kiosk and Boat Hire, built around 1918, is situated at Cottage Point at the entrance to Coal and Candle Creek.
- Jerusalem Bay is accessible by a track which is part of the Great North Walk from Cowan railway station next to the Pacific Highway. The track passes through a creek gorge lined with temperate rainforest and large turpentines before opening to the bay. At the bay is an old abandoned habitation site. It opens out to Cowan Water and Broken Bay making it popular with boating and fishing enthusiasts. After the bay the track proceeds up a steep climb past Campbell's Crater and along the ridge to Brooklyn. Campbell's Crater is a volcanic diatreme containing subtropical rainforest species such as red cedars and Cabbage Palms with a floor of ferns.

== See also ==
- Church Point Ferry
- Protected areas of New South Wales
- Geography of Sydney
