= Coal and Candle Creek =

River in New South Wales, Australia

Coordinates: 33°37′S 151°13′E

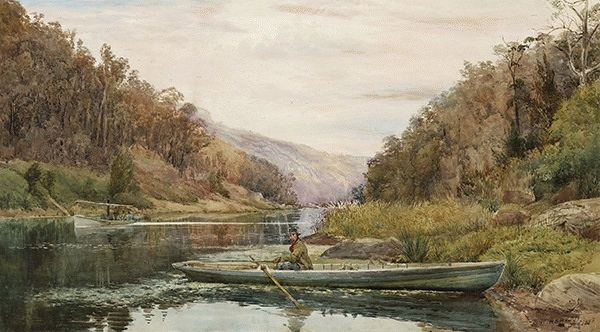
Cole and Candle Creek 1883

Coal and Candle Creek is a creek located in Kuringai Chase National Park, near Sydney, Australia. It is a tributary of Cowan Creek, which flows into the Hawkesbury River. It can be reached via the park's Centre Trail.

The origins and meaning of the creek's name are uncertain. A "Special Correspondent" for The Sydney Morning Herald in 1950 suggested that the name might be connected to a phrase used to refer to the free fuel and lighting which came with some forms of employment in England, leading to the jobs being described as "coal and candle" jobs. The correspondent had no further information as to how the phrase might have come to be associated with this particular creek.

== See also ==
- Cottage Point, New South Wales
