= COVID-19 pandemic in the Australian Capital Territory =

- Disease: COVID-19
- Pathogen: SARS-CoV-2
- Location: Australian Capital Territory, Australia
- First outbreak: Wuhan, Hubei, China
- Date: As of 12 February 2022
- Confirmed cases: 41,380 (PCR & RAT tests)
- Active cases: 2,530
- Hospitalised cases: 50
- Critical cases: 4
- Ventilator cases: 2
- Recovered: 41,380
- Deaths: 31 (as of 8 February 2022)
- Fatality rate: 0.08%
- Test positivity rate: 0.62% (last 7 days) (as of 5 September 2021)
- Vaccinations: First dose: 235,683, Second dose: 172,327

Government website
- www.covid19.act.gov.au

The COVID-19 pandemic in the Australian Capital Territory is part of the ongoing worldwide pandemic of the coronavirus disease 2019 (COVID-19) caused by severe acute respiratory syndrome coronavirus 2 (SARS-CoV-2). After one case of the delta variant in mid-August 2021, the Territory went into lockdown. By 26 September, the ACT had its first COVID-19 related death since mid-April 2020, nearly 18 months, followed by 3 more deaths in the first week of October 2021. 28 deaths during the outbreak since 12 August 2021 brought total deaths to 31, the most recent being on 8 February 2022.

== Timeline ==
=== 2020 ===
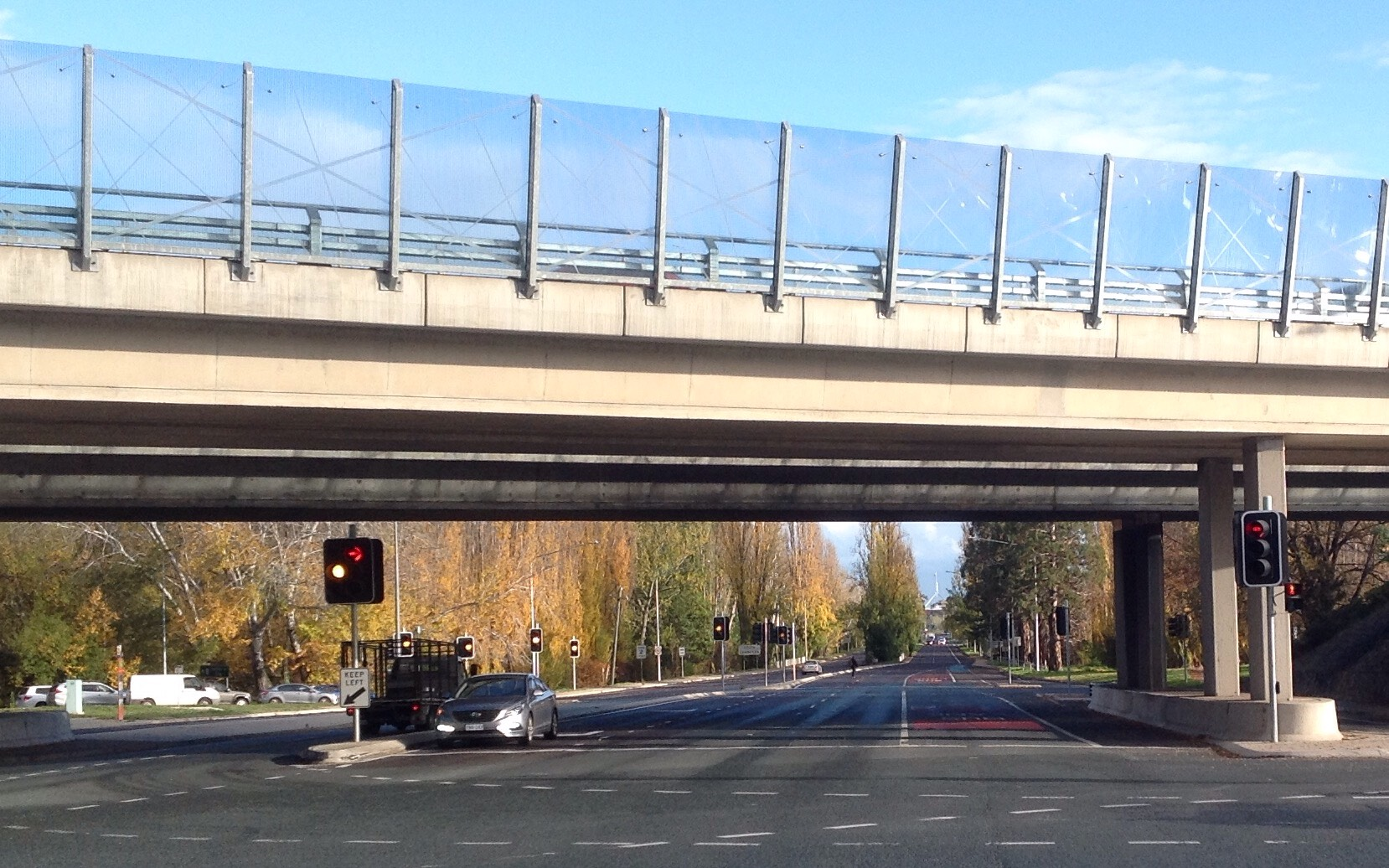
Canberra Avenue during what would usually be the morning peak hour in May 2020

On 16 March 2020, the ACT government declared a public health emergency. All visits to the Alexander Maconochie prison were cancelled from 23 March, but there was "increased access to telephones" for prisoners to keep in touch with their families.

The third recorded death in the ACT occurred on 15 April 2020, a passenger from the Ruby Princess.

In mid-June 2020, The ACT Government froze business registration, development applications and parking fees. Chief Minister Andrew Barr said " ... this is one of the many ways the government can help address the cost of doing business, and the cost of living, during this pandemic." Rate rebates were given for all commercial properties, for residential properties rebates were given and rate deferrals also offered, stamp duty and payroll tax concessions were also available.

In late June 2020, public transport fares in the ACT were frozen for at least 12 months to aid in economic recovery. Birth, death and marriage registrations, building, domestic animal, fire and emergency services levy, land title, public health, security industry fees, water and sewerage charges were also frozen. Public transport usage was then half pre-pandemic levels, but motor vehicle usage had returned to normal.

On 18 July 2020, it was announced a sitting of Federal Parliament, scheduled for the first two weeks of August, had been cancelled. Medical advice was that, due to increased transmission of COVID-19 in Victoria, and the upward trend in NSW as well, there was a "significant risk" if members were to return to Canberra from all over Australia. Prime Minister Morrison requested that the sitting be cancelled. Parliament returned in August with some Members and Senators participating via video links from remote locations.

On 9 September 2020 in Canberra, the "Check in CBR" sign-in/contact tracing app was introduced.

ChooseCBR vouchers

In late November the ACT government announced the "ChooseCBR" electronic voucher discount scheme to help stimulate local businesses suffering economically from the "coronavirus recession". Residents could receive several renewable vouchers worth up to A$40 per day. Owing to slow take up the scheme was extended a few days from 21 December to Christmas Eve. About 40,000 people had signed up, but less than A$150,000 of A$500,000 allocated had been claimed as of midday that day.

In May 2021 an expanded ChooseCBR scheme was announced. Bigger discounts were offered and more money, A$2 million, was allocated. The new scheme proved popular when launched on 9 June, but its website crashed and the scheme was suspended a week. In the two days it operated, over A$300,000 had been claimed, 10 times that claimed in the December 2020 trial.

=== 2021 ===
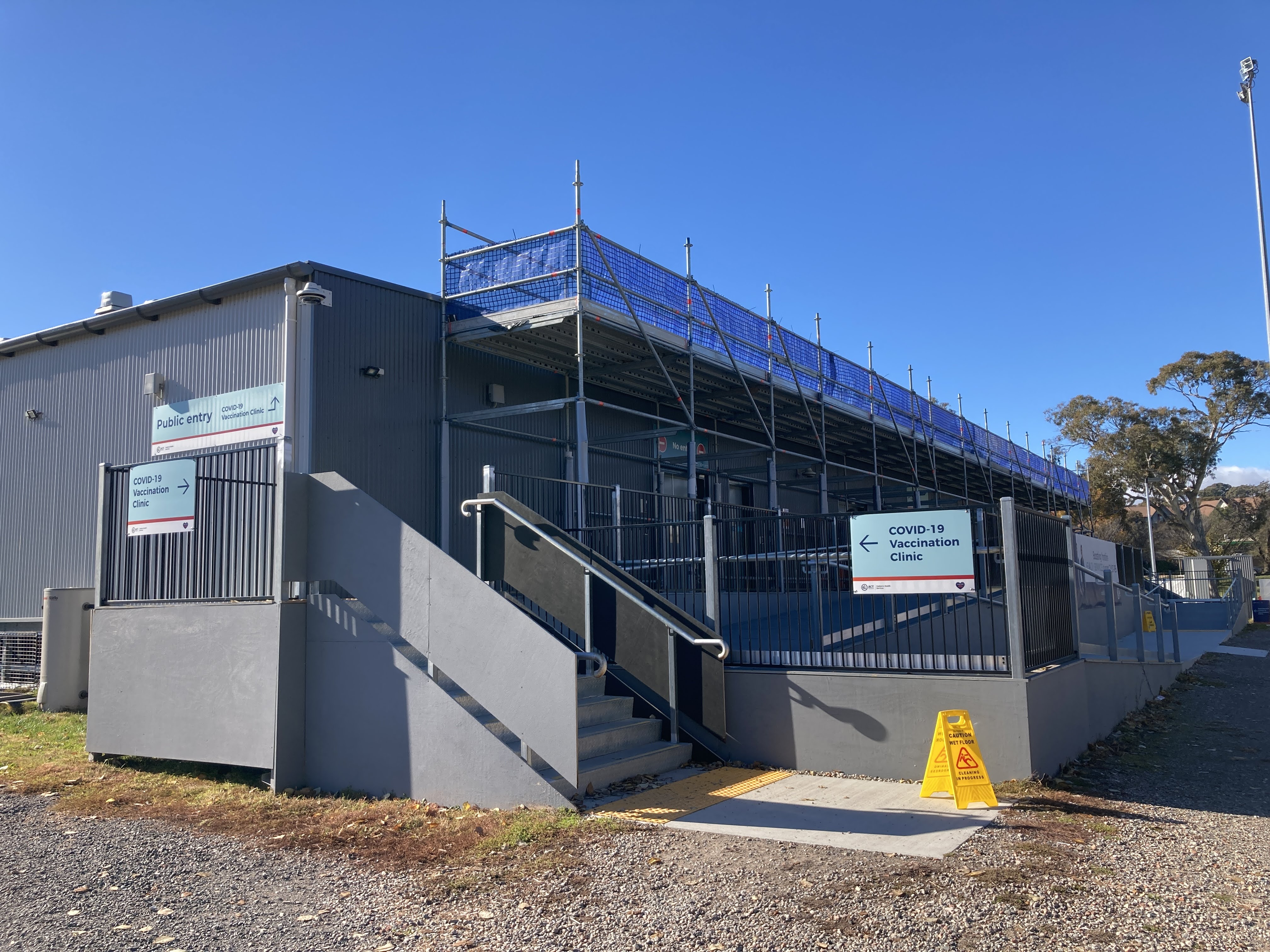
A COVID-19 vaccination clinic in Canberra during May 2021

On 31 January 2021, Federal politicians flying in from Western Australia had to quarantine for five days when a sudden lockdown was declared in Perth and two adjoining regions. Parliament was scheduled to resume on 2 February.

On 17 February 2021, the Australian Capital Territory's public health emergency declaration was extended 90 days to 18 May 2021. Every three months during the pandemic, the ACT government has lengthened the public health emergency.

On 22 February 2021, the first Canberran received a COVID-19 vaccination. She was a 22-year-old registered nurse, and a member of a COVID-19 testing team.

On 23 June, due to a growing cluster of COVID-19 around Bondi in Sydney, the ACT Health Minister, Rachel Stephen-Smith, advised against travel to the Greater Sydney area. From 4pm that day the ACT Government placed restrictions on recent travellers from:

- the City of Sydney,
- Bayside,
- Canada Bay,
- Inner West,
- Randwick,
- Waverley,
- Woollahra

Unless they have an approved exemption, non-ACT residents who have been in any of the listed LGAs in NSW will find the border in effect closed to them. Canberra residents who re-enter the ACT that have been in any of the seven areas in the preceding 14 days have to register with ACT Health.

Canberra residents who visited the Greater Sydney, Blue Mountains, Central Coast, Wollongong or Shellharbour regions in the preceding 14 days need to make an online declaration with ACT Health. If they left the designated LGAs after 4pm on 23 June, they must isolate at home, and only leave it for "essential purposes" until 11:59pm on 30 June.

ACT residents subject to the stay-at-home order can only leave home for:

- essential work, if they cannot work from home
- shopping for essential supplies
- receiving medical care, or caring for the vulnerable
- exercise, up to an hour a day
- animal feeding
- to get a COVID-19 test
- to get a COVID-19 vaccination

They also had to wear a mask while outdoors, unless vigorously exercising, or under 12 years-of-age.

On 23 June the Handmade Market Canberra was postponed for three weeks "due to COVID concerns". ACT Health advised that the markets "should not go ahead in the wake of the coronavirus cases in NSW". The markets were due to return for the first time in 18 months on the weekend of 24–26 June, but were rescheduled to 16–18 July. The postponement resulted in the early launch of a Handmade Australia website.

On 28 June, wearing of masks became compulsory in the ACT when in indoor public venues. ACT residents returning from the city of Darwin, Palmerston and Litchfield LGAs were subject to stay-at-home orders. The mask requirement was lifted on 10 July.

On 1 July the ACT government announced that from 15 July use of the Check in CBR app would be mandatory, in department stores, supermarkets, take away services, petrol stations, all ride-sharing services and on public transport.
As of 1 July, there were no new cases of COVID-19 In the ACT for 57 days, and no cases of transmission in the general ACT community for 356 days.

On 7 July, stay-at-home orders in the ACT were extended to 16 July after NSW extended its lockdown by 7 days.

From 11:59pm on July 11, Victoria closed its border to all Australian Capital Territory, and New South Wales, residents to try to prevent the delta variant entering the state. ACT Chief Minister Andrew Barr tweeted that it was "incredibly disappointing and frustrating" after more than a year with no local COVID-19 cases that the border was being closed to Canberrans. He continued "Canberra is not part of Greater Sydney."

On 14 July, a national women's safety summit, scheduled for 29–30 July at Parliament House, was postponed due to a COVID-19 outbreak in Sydney. It was rescheduled to 6–7 September.

On 26 July, it was announced that, from 2 August until 3 September, Parliament House would come under COVID-19 restrictions to "minimise non-essential activity" as politicians arrive for the next legislative sitting. All public galleries will close and the general public unable to enter the building. Politicians attending, and their staff, will be "substantially reduced" and remote participation technology used in the houses. Physical distancing, in chambers and meeting rooms, will return. Use of the Check-in CBR app extends to all food and beverage venues open under takeaway only restrictions.

==== 2021 lockdown ====
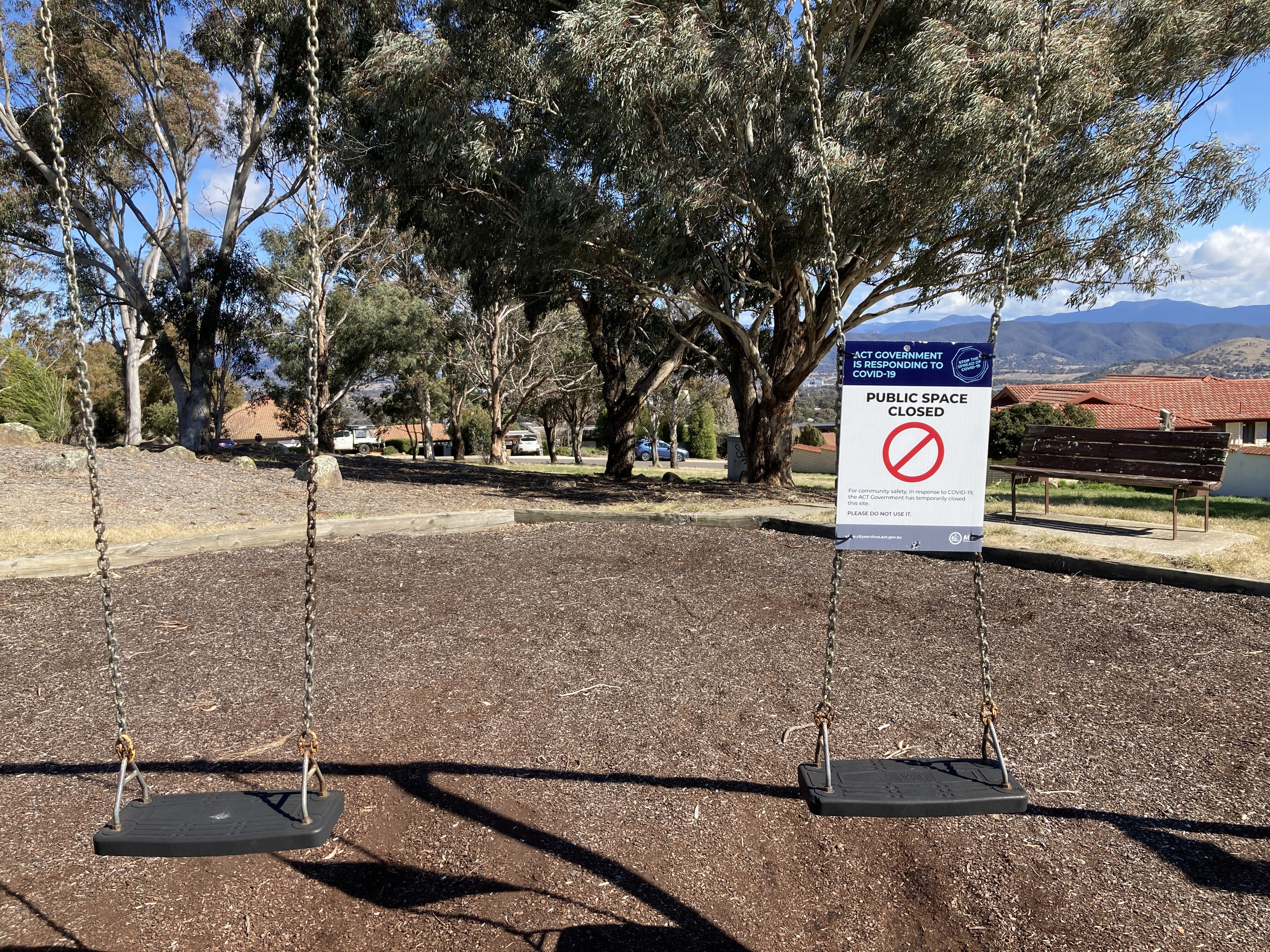
A closed playground in August 2021

On 12 August the ACT, including Canberra, went into lockdown at 5pm for an initial seven days. This followed the first locally acquired case of COVID-19 since 10 July 2020, over a year, who was assessed as potentially infectious in the community since Sunday, 8 August. As of 16 August 2021 the source of the Gungahlin persons' infection is unknown. The lockdown announcement triggered panic buying in the Territory. Three close contacts of the first detected case were later found to be infected, increasing the active cases to four. Genomic sequencing confirmed he had the Delta variant.

In response, NSW ordered that anyone who was in the ACT since 5 August must isolate under stay-at-home rules and may only leave their residence with a "reasonable excuse".

On 13 August, two more positive cases were detected in the ACT increasing the number of active cases there to six. Four of the cases are linked to the original case, an infected school student is not known to be linked. There have been 1,862 close contacts linked to the first case.

On 16 August, the first confirmed case of an aged care worker being infected was reported, and the lockdown was extended for a further two weeks until 2 September 2021.

By 18 August about 400 essential medical staff were in quarantine, stretching the ACTs' capacity in COVID testing and other areas. Some treating clinics had to close early when they reached full capacity.

On 23 August the ACT reported 30 new cases, for a total of 167 active cases.

On 31 August the ACT lockdown was extended again until 17 September.

===== September =====
On 4 September, the ACT recorded its highest total of 32 new confirmed cases, exceeding the territory's previous record of 30 on 23 August.

On 14 September the lockdown was extended for a further 4 weeks until 11:59pm on 15 October. This followed 22 new cases being reported. By the same day, there were 252 active cases in the ACT. There were 10 hospitalised, with 2 in intensive care, 1 requiring ventilation.

On 26 September the first COVID death in the ACT since mid-April 2020 occurred, nearly 18 months apart, increasing the total number ACT COVID deaths to 4. The man was fully vaccinated, but in his 90s, and undergoing end-of-life treatment at Calvary Haydon Aged Care.

The same day in the ACT there were:

- 19 new COVID-19 cases, at least 8 infectious while in the community.
- 17 linked to known cases or clusters, 2 were unlinked
- 8 people were hospitalised with the virus, 3 in ICU and on ventilation

===== October =====
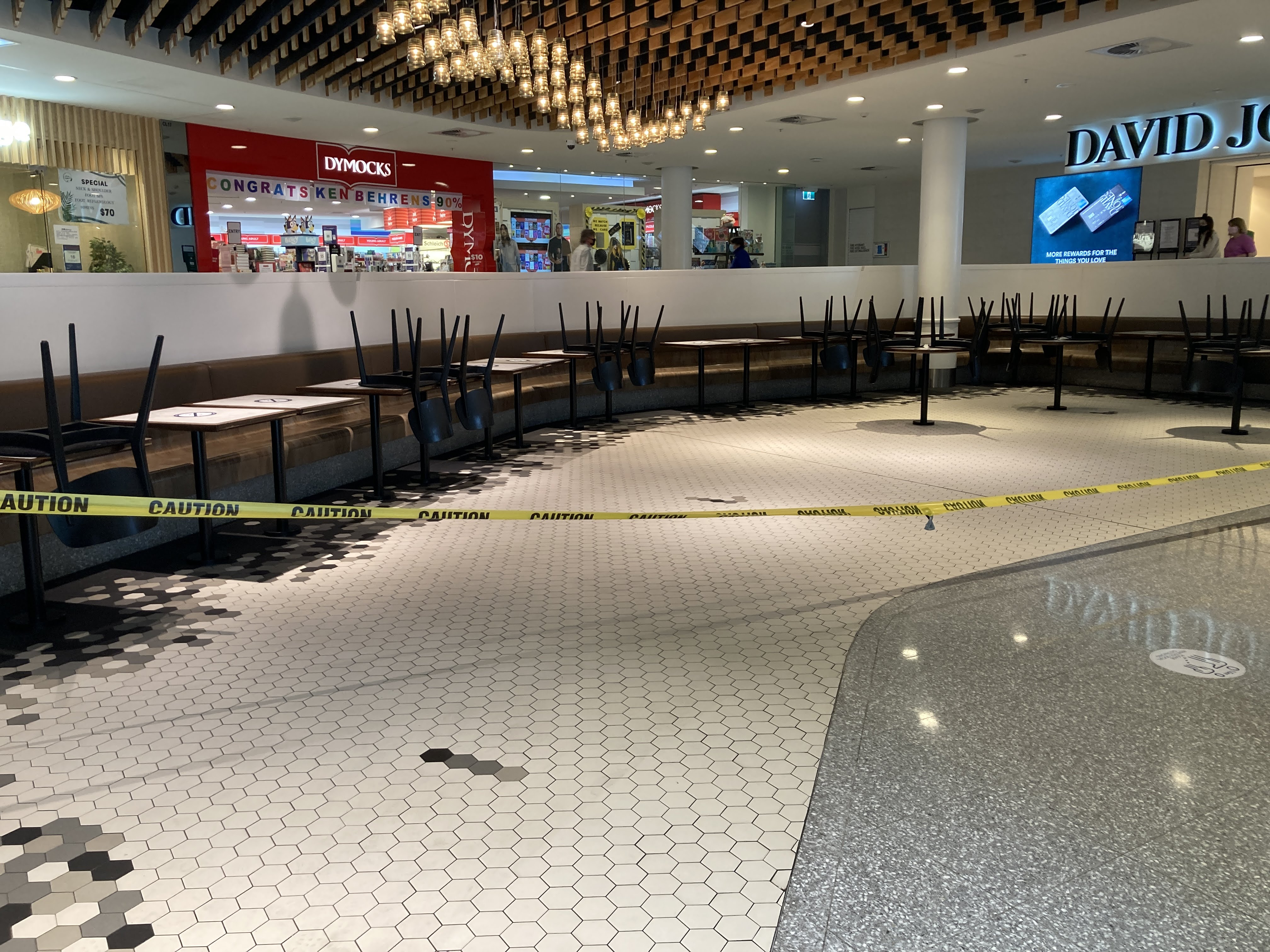
Roped off seating in the Canberra Centre in late October 2021

By 4 October 2 more deaths occurred, both women in their 80s, increasing the total number ACT COVID deaths to 6. One was fully vaccinated, and also undergoing end-of-life treatment at Calvary Haydon Aged Care. The other was admitted to The Canberra Hospital on 30 September, and had palliative care for COVID-19 and other health issues

The same day in the ACT there were:

- 28 new COVID-19 cases, at least 16 infectious while in the community
- 16 linked to known cases or clusters, 14 were unlinked
- 18 people were hospitalised with the virus, 5 in ICU, 1 on ventilation
  - youngest in hospital in their 20s, oldest their 80s
- 362 active cases

The ACT first dose vaccination rate was at 95%.

By 6 October, another death had occurred, a woman in her 70s, increasing the total number of ACT COVID deaths to 7. She was also undergoing end-of-life treatment at Calvary Haydon Aged Care.

The same day in the ACT there were:

- 28 new COVID-19 cases, at least 5 infectious while in the community, 11 in quarantine during their infectious period
- 19 linked to known cases or clusters, 9 were being investigated
- 16 people were hospitalised with the virus, 7 in ICU, 4 on ventilation

The ACT two dose vaccination rate was at 66%.

On 15 October, the lockdown in the ACT was lifted, though mask mandates indoors and outdoors remained in effect.

On 31 October, two people with COVID-19 died, a man in his 60s, a woman in her 70s, both had been under intensive care. This raised to 10 the total number of COVID deaths in the territory.

==== November ====
On 4 November, a man in his 40s with COVID died in an ICU unit. This brought deaths during the territory's Delta outbreak to 11.

On 12 November, most remaining restrictions were lifted in the ACT. Masks were no longer mandatory outdoors and in many indoor locations, except on public transport, in schools and universities, for front-of-house hospitality staff, and in high-risk facilities such as hospitals. Rules limiting crowd sizes were relaxed, and closed recreation and entertainment venues were permitted to reopen. Some restrictions, including requiring masks indoors, were reintroduced on 22 December.

==== December ====
On 3 December, a positive COVID-19 test conducted on 1 December was confirmed to be the Omicron variant, the first case of the variant in the territory. Almost 98 percent of Canberrans aged 12 and above were fully vaccinated.

On 8 December the twelfth COVID-19 death in the ACT, a man in his 80s with underlying health conditions, at Calvary Public Hospital was reported.

From 22 December, in order to slow the Omicron variants' spread, masks were again made mandatory indoors, after that requirement was mostly dropped on 12 November. Caps on aged care facility visitors also returned. In the previous seven days the ACT recorded 103 new COVID-19 cases, but only 37 in the seven days before that. 62 cases were confirmed as Omicron.

=== 2022 ===
==== January ====
On 1 January the ACT had 505 new cases, 4,795 total cases for the current outbreak. Active cases were at 1,827. There were 9 cases hospitalised, 1 in intensive care (ICU), 1 on a ventilator.

On 2 January the ACT had 514 new cases, 5,199 total cases for the current outbreak. Active cases were at 2,116. There were 11 cases hospitalised, 2 in intensive care (ICU), 1 on a ventilator.

On 3 January the ACT had 926 new cases, 6,120 total cases for the current outbreak. Active cases were at 2,789. There were 9 cases hospitalised, 1 in intensive care (ICU), 1 on a ventilator.

On 4 January the ACT had 810 new cases, 7,006 total cases for the current outbreak. Active cases were at 3,069. There were 16 cases hospitalised, 1 in intensive care (ICU), 1 on a ventilator. 98.5% of ACT residents aged 12 and over were fully vaccinated.

On 5 January the ACT had 992 new cases, 8,021 total cases for the current outbreak. Active cases were at 3,565. There were 20 cases hospitalised, 2 in intensive care (ICU), 2 on a ventilator. 18.9% of ACT residents 18 years and over had received a booster vaccine dose.

On 6 January the ACT had 1,246 new cases, 9,429 total cases for the current outbreak. Active cases were at 4,511. There were 24 cases hospitalised, 3 in intensive care (ICU), 3 on a ventilator.

On 7 January the ACT had 1,305 new cases, 10,777 total cases for the current outbreak. Active cases were at 4,941. There were 24 cases hospitalised, 5 in intensive care (ICU), 4 on a ventilator. 20.3% of ACT residents 18 years and over had received a booster vaccine dose.

On 8 January the ACT had 1,039 new cases, 12,176 total cases for the current outbreak. Active cases were at 5,766. There were 27 cases hospitalised, 4 in ICU, 4 on a ventilator.

On 9 January the ACT had 938 new cases, 13,248 total cases for the current outbreak. Active cases were at 5,681. There were 25 cases hospitalised, 4 in ICU, 3 on a ventilator. 22.5% of ACT residents 18 years and over had received a booster dose.

On 10 January the ACT had 1 death, a man in his 80s, raising total deaths to 16. There was also 1,508 new cases,13,248 total cases for the current outbreak. Active cases were at 6,302. There were 28 cases hospitalised, 4 in ICU, 3 on a ventilator. 24.3% of ACT residents 18 years and over had received a booster dose.

As of 14 January:
• 98.6% of ACT residents aged 12+ were fully vaccinated
• 28.1% aged 18 years+ had received a booster dose
• 15.3% aged 5–11 had one vaccine dose

On 15 January the ACT had 2 deaths, a man in his 50s and a man in his 90s, raising total deaths to 18. There were also 1,316 new cases, raising total cases to 22,396 (19,687 PCR and 2,709 RAT tests) for the current outbreak. Active cases were at 3,257. There were 41 cases hospitalised, 3 in ICU, 2 on a ventilator.

On 16 January the ACT had 1 death, a woman in her 50s, raising total deaths to 19. There were also 1,601 new cases, raising total cases to 23,761 (20,468 PCR, 3,293 RAT) for the current outbreak. Active cases were at 3,205. There were 52 cases hospitalised, 4 in ICU, 2 on a ventilator.

On 17 January the ACT had 1 more death, a woman in her 80s at a care facility, raising total deaths to 20. There were also 1,860 new cases (976 PCR, 884 RAT), raising total cases to 26,341 (22,333 PCR, 4,008 RAT) for the current outbreak. Active cases were at 3,585. There were 63 cases hospitalised, 6 in ICU, 2 on a ventilator.

On 20 January the ACT had 2 deaths, a man in his 60s and a man in his 90s, raising total deaths to 22. There were also 826 new cases (259 PCR, 567 RAT), raising total cases to 29,245 (23,296 PCR, 5,949 RAT). Active cases were at 5,647 (1,463 PCR, 4,184 RAT). There were 62 cases hospitalised, 2 in ICU, 1 on a ventilator.

On 23 January the ACT had 2 more deaths, a man in his 40s and a man in his 90s, raising total deaths to 24. There were also 756 new cases (472 PCR, 284 RAT), raising total cases to 31,208 (24,301 PCR, 6,907 RAT). Active cases were at 5,069 (1,712 PCR, 3,357 RAT). There were 68 cases hospitalised, 3 in ICU, 1 on a ventilator.

On 24 January the ACT had 1 death, a woman in her 80s, raising total deaths to 25. There were also 904 new cases (546 PCR, 358 RAT), raising total cases to 32,042 (24,811 PCR, 7,231 RAT). Active cases were at 4,829 (1,935 PCR, 2,894 RAT). There were 67 cases hospitalised, 3 in ICU, 1 on a ventilator.

On 27 January the ACT had 1 death, a man in his 80s, raising total deaths to 26. There were also 734 new cases (478 PCR, 256 RAT), raising total cases to 34,352 (26,461 PCR, 7,891 RAT). Active cases were down to 4,744 (2,952 PCR, 1,792 RAT). There were 66 cases hospitalised, 5 in ICU, 1 on a ventilator.

On 30 January, COVID control measures in the ACT, such as mask wearing, check-in and density rules in hospitality venues, were extended until 25 February 2022.

On 31 January the ACT had no deaths, but here were 522 new cases (326 PCR, 196 RAT), raising total cases to 36,403 (27,813 PCR, 8,590 RAT). Active cases were at 3,750 (2,442 PCR, 1,308 RAT). There were 64 cases hospitalised, 1 in ICU on a ventilator.

The same day protesters in the "Convoy to Canberra" began arriving in the city. The convoy participants included anti-mandatory vaccination protesters and sovereign citizen movement members. Some vehicles travelled from interstate for thousands of kilometres to join the convoy. Police intervened when "hundreds of people" who were protesting approached the public entrance to Parliament House.

==== February ====
By 2 February, the Convoy to Canberra protest convoy had illegally camped on the Patrick White lawns adjacent to the National Library of Australia. There were 3 arrests when a police officer was assaulted after police attempted to give protestors written notices about illegal parking and camping.

On 3 February the ACT had 1 death, a man in his 90s. raising total deaths to 27, There were 449 new cases (274 PCR, 175 RAT), raising total cases to 37,771 (28,650 PCR, 9,121 RAT). Active cases were down to 2,954 (1,772 PCR, 1,182 RAT). There were 65 cases hospitalised, 1 in ICU on a ventilator.
• 98.6% of ACT residents aged 12 and over were fully vaccinated
• 53.2% aged 18 years+ had received a booster dose
• 71.9% aged 5–11 had one vaccine dose

Contact tracing COVID-19 cases ended in early February. The requirement to continue checking in with the Check in CBR app remained in place, but Health Minister Rachel Stephen-Smith stated that it would no longer be enforced.

On 4 February the ACT had 1 death, a man in his 60s. raising total deaths to 28. There were 372 new cases (209 PCR, 163 RAT), raising total cases to 38,123 (28,848 PCR, 9,275 RAT). Active cases were down to 2,779 (1,618 PCR, 1,161 RAT). There were 63 cases hospitalised, 1 in ICU on a ventilator.

On 5 February, anti-vaccination mandate protestors, estimated to exceed 2,000, went to the Parliamentary Triangle. A march began at Glebe Park in the CBD, then onto Commonwealth Avenue, disrupting traffic. Members of Parliament, Craig Kelly and George Christensen attended the protests.

On 6 February the ACT had 1 death, a man in his 90s. raising total deaths to 29. There were 299 new cases (123 PCR, 176 RAT), raising total cases to 38,698 (29,116 PCR, 9,582 RAT). Active cases were down to 2,406 (1,334 PCR, 1,072 RAT). There were 57 cases hospitalised, including 2 in ICU and 1 on a ventilator.

On 7 February the ACT had 1 death, a man in his 70s. raising total deaths to 30. There were 495 new cases (264 PCR, 231 RAT), raising total cases to 39,165 (29,365 PCR, 9,800 RAT). Active cases were down to 2,369 (1,259 PCR, 1,110 RAT). There were 55 cases hospitalised, including 1 in ICU and 1 on a ventilator.

On 8 February the ACT had 1 death, a man in his 90s. raising total deaths to 31. There were 475 new cases (281 PCR, 194 RAT), raising total cases to 39,613 (29,634 PCR, 9,979 RAT). Active cases were down to 2,365 (1,242 PCR, 1,123 RAT). There were 54 cases hospitalised, including 4 in ICU and 1 on a ventilator.

On 10 February, the ACT Public Health Emergency Declaration was extended by 3 months.

From 12 February, COVID check-in requirements were eased and will only be needed at higher risk venues, such as:

- licensed bars and pubs
- nightclubs
- registered clubs
- strip clubs and brothels
- organised events that are:
  • not ticketed or pre-registered
  -- including conferences, markets, and music and cultural events
- schools, early childhood education and care

Other venues were no longer required to display QR codes, or to ask patrons to check in. They may continue to display their QR codes for voluntary use.

Also on 12 February, members of the convoy protest against vaccination mandates, who had been demonstrating in Canberra since late January, breached barricades at Parliament House. 3 people were arrested. The protesters had camped at Exhibition Park in Canberra (EPIC), after being moved on from the lawns next to the National Library, early in February. The overnight arrival of up to 15 thousand more protesters at EPIC caused the cancellation of the second day of the fundraising Lifeline Book Fair there on 12 February. The protesters were told they had to move out by the evening of 13 February.

==== May ====
The final requirements to check-in with the Check in CBR app were removed.

==== November ====
The Check in CBR app was decommissioned.

=== 2023 ===
The ACT Government ended the COVID-19 Management Declaration on 28 February 2023. At this time a requirement that people report positive rapid antigen test results was the only remaining COVID-19 health restriction; the ACT was the last jurisdiction in Australia to retain this requirement. The Garran Surge Centre was also closed at this time.

== Event cancellations ==
- The 2020 Australian Defence Force Academy open day was replaced by an on-line event. The 2021 open day was scheduled for 21 August, a virtual event was planned for late September.
- Floriade: the 2020 event, scheduled for 12 September to 11 October, at Commonwealth Park was cancelled in April 2020. The one million bulbs and annuals that would have been on display there were distributed over 130 different sites to create a Tulip Trail through Canberra as Floriade: Reimagined. Floriade was cancelled again in 2021 on 21 August 2021. Flowers that were to be displayed in Commonwealth Park were distributed around Canberra as they were in 2020.
- The 2020 National Folk Festival was cancelled. In 2021 a scaled-down 2-day version titled "Good Folk", was held over the border in Queanbeyan, NSW on the weekend of 3–4 April.
- Skyfire, a fireworks show normally held in March, was cancelled in 2020 due to the COVID-19 pandemic. In November 2020, the 2021 show was also cancelled due to the pandemic in Australia.
- Summernats 2021 was cancelled in October 2020. The reason for cancellation was that the venue, Exhibition Park in Canberra, was being used as a COVID-19 testing station. The smaller "Summernats Rev Rock 'n' Roll" event was then scheduled to be held on 5-7 March 2021, but on 13 January 2021 that too was cancelled.
- The Royal Canberra Show 2021 was cancelled in November 2020.
- In November 2020, the 2021 National Multicultural Festival, was postponed from its usual February dates to "... by late 2021". In early 2021 the Festival for that year was cancelled entirely. It was then planned for the next festival to be held on 18–20 February 2022, its 25th anniversary, but in November 2021 the 2022 festival was also cancelled due to the planning group being retasked for three months to pandemic response.
- Canberra's New Year's Eve fireworks celebrating the start of 2021 were cancelled. This was the second year in a row that the New Year's Fireworks for 2020 were cancelled after the Bushfire smoke.
- The return of Handmade Canberra market, for the first time in 18 months, was postponed on 23 June 2021. The markets was set for the weekend of 24–26 June, but were rescheduled to 16–18 July due to "COVID concerns."

== Statistics ==
COVID-19 cumulative cases in the Australian Capital Territory

View source data.

COVID-19 daily cases in the Australian Capital Territory

View source data.

== See also ==
- Timeline of the COVID-19 pandemic in Australia
- COVID-19 pandemic in Australia
- COVID-19 pandemic
