= 2020–21 Melbourne City FC (women) season =

6th season in existence of Melbourne City FC (women)

Melbourne City (women)
2020–21 season
- Chairman: Khaldoon Al Mubarak
- Head Coach: Rado Vidošić
- Stadium: CB Smith Reserve; AAMI Park; Frank Holahan Reserve; Kingston Heath Soccer Complex
- W-League: 7th
- W-League Finals: DNQ
- Top goalscorer: Alex Chidiac (3)
- Highest home attendance: 1,975 vs. Brisbane Roar (31 January 2021); W-League
- Lowest home attendance: 326 vs. Newcastle Jets (14 March 2021); W-League
- Average home league attendance: 748
- Biggest win: 1–0 (twice); 2–1 (once); 3–2 (once)
- Biggest defeat: 0–6 vs. Melbourne Victory (H) (10 January 2021); A-League Women
Home colours	Away colours	Third colours

The 2020–21 season was the sixth in the history of Melbourne City Football Club (women). Managed by Rado Vidošić, Melbourne City finished 7th in their W-League season.

== Review ==
=== Background ===
The 2019–20 season saw Melbourne City play through an undefeated season; 11 wins and 1 draw in the regular season to win their second W-League Premiership and a successful Finals series; winning the Grand Final 1–0 against Sydney FC to win their record fourth Championship. The Grand Final was impacted by the COVID-19 pandemic in Australia, forcing the match to be played behind closed doors.

=== Pre-season ===
On 22 June 2020, Kyah Simon departed Melbourne City through a mutual contract termination in pursuing overseas opportunities. On 2 July 2020, captain Steph Catley had departed the club for Women's Super League side Arsenal. It was only six days later, that former and teammate Lydia Williams had joined Arsenal on 8 July 2020 along with Steph Catley. Following the end of August, another departure for Rebekah Stott occurred 28 August 2020 also for pursuing overseas opportunities.

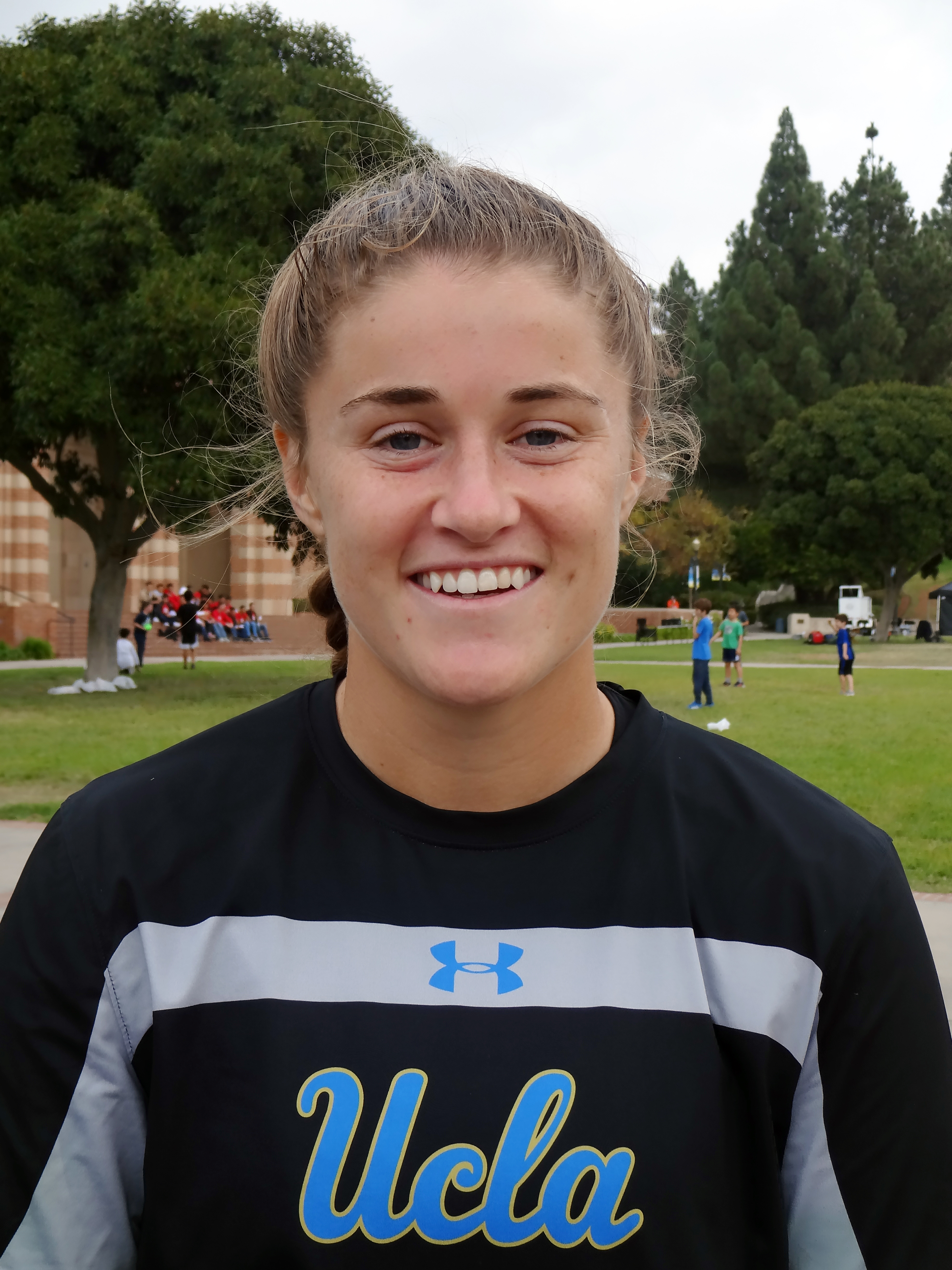
Teagan Micah with the UCLA Bruins

The A-League and W-League calendar for the 2020–21 season was officially announced on 15 October 2020. The first signing of the season occurred on 24 November 2020, with Teagan Micah joining from Norwegian club Arna-Bjørnar. Two further signings were made the day after, with Hollie Palmer and re-signed Rhali Dobson on 25 November 2020. Another double signing the day after had Leah Davidson and Julia Sardo sign with Melbourne City. The final two signings for the week had Samantha Johnson on the 27th and the return of Teigan Allen on the 28th. This full week included five new players joining the squad and one further re-signing. The full draw for the 2020–21 W-League was released on 30 November 2020; the first match to be kicked off exactly a month later on 30 December away to Sydney FC in a double-header at ANZ Stadium. A further signing on that day was Tori Tumeth; former Junior Matildas player and captain.

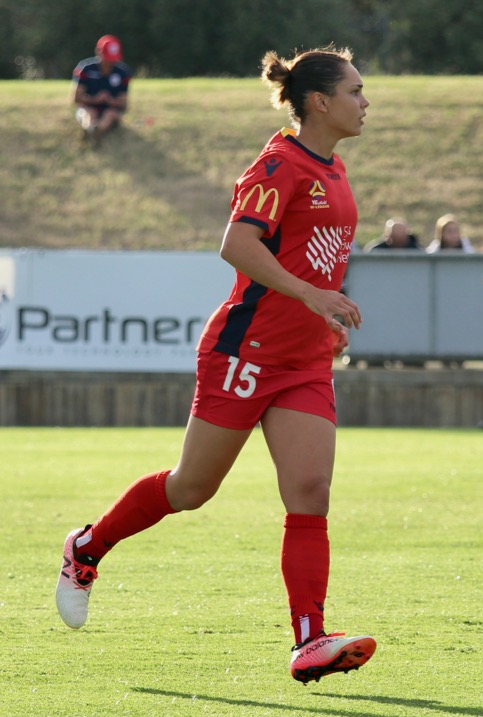
Emma Checker with Adelaide United in 2018.

On 1 December 2020, City re-signed Chelsea Blissett for the upcoming season. The launch week of the season concluded after numerous signings for the season; the squad so far including one goalkeeper, six defenders, two midfielders and an attacker. with further singings expected. Two days later, goalkeeper Melissa Barbieri returned to City as a playing assistant coach. Winger Tyla-Jay Vlajnic re-signed for City ahead of the season on 7 December 2020 and the signing of defender Jenna McCormick on 9 December 2020. Melbourne City announced a relocation of the club to the City of Casey and City of Greater Dandenong for a brand-new elite sporting facility of a new City Football Academy on 14 December 2020.

Blissett was confirmed with a knee injury ruling her out the entire season on 17 December 2020. A friendly against the Melbourne Victory was played on 19 December 2020 in preparations for the upcoming W-League campaign, resulting in a 3–3 draw via goals by Franny Iermano, Tori Tumeth and Rhali Dobson. On 20 December 2020, City signed Japanese international attacker Chinatsu Kira from Urawa Reds, and re-signed defender Emma Checker the next day. A fixture update was confirmed due to COVID-19 outbreaks on 22 December 2020, forcing the opening match against Sydney FC away to ANZ Stadium to be scrapped and replaced by Brisbane Roar away at Dolphin Stadium on 29 December. A further four rounds for City were confirmed two days later, their away match to Canberra United brought forward due to travel restrictions and border closures based on the COVID-19 pandemic in the Australian Capital Territory, back-to-back home fixtures at Frank Holohan Reserve against Melbourne Victory and Adelaide United in the space of four days, and an away match to Perth Glory. The final pre-season signing occurred on 27 December 2020 with Alex Chidiac becoming the third Matildas player returning from Europe to sign for City this season.

=== December/January ===
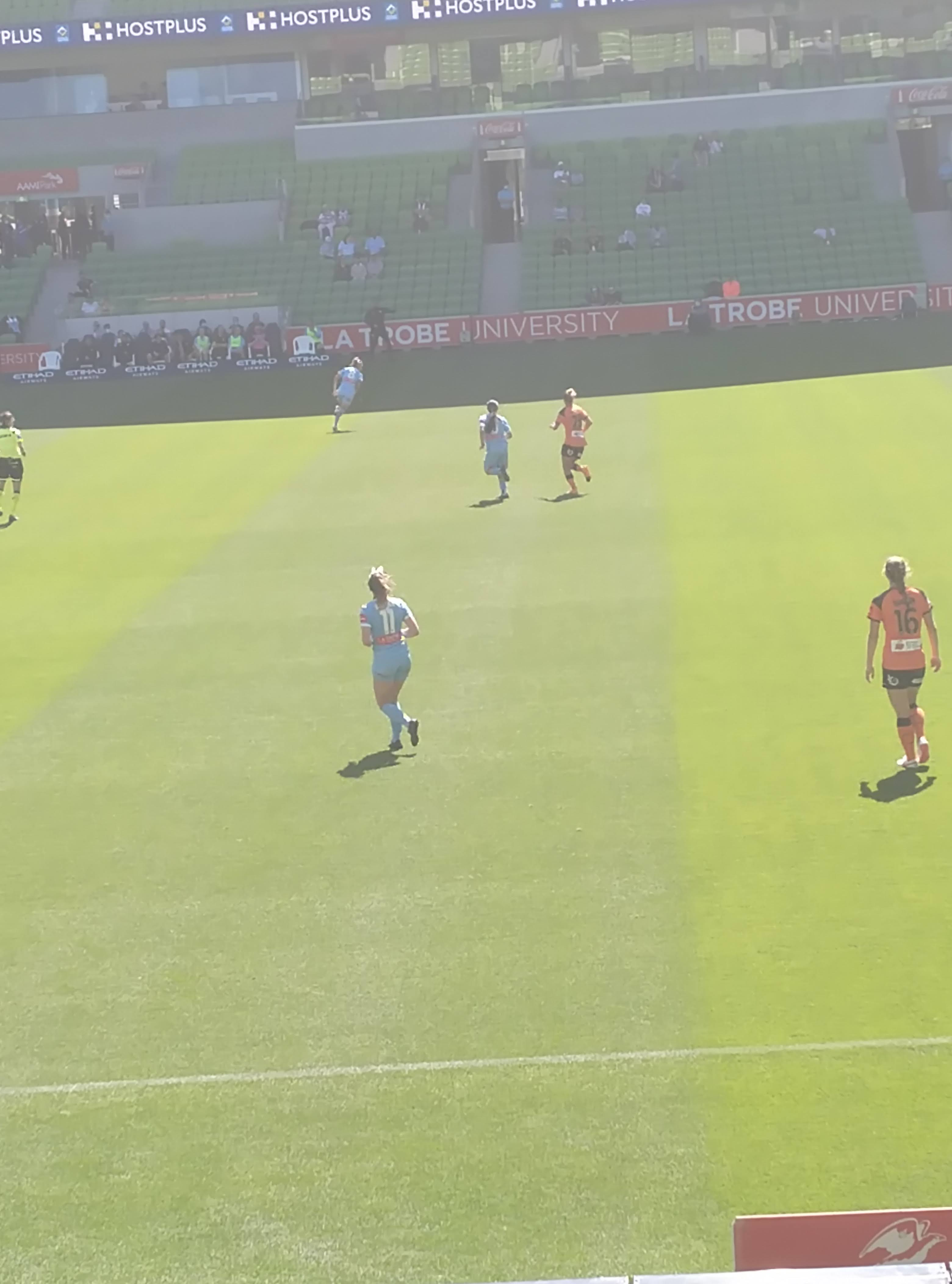
Melbourne City v Brisbane Roar at AAMI Park; 31 January 2021

City began their W-League campaign on 29 December against the Brisbane Roar away to Dolphin Stadium; nine of City's new signings in the starting line-up, resulting in a 0–0 draw to start off the campaign. Four players were unavailable for Round 2's clash against Canberra United; Chelsea Blissett and Sofia Sakalis with torn ACLs, Alex Chidiac quarantined and Emma Checker in stress fracture. City would then play their first loss of the season on 3 January, going down 2–1 to Canberra through a late winner, dropping from third to sixth place spot. Due to considerable damages at Frank Holohan Reserve; the venue that was to play City's home Melbourne Derby on 10 January was moved to play at CB Smith Reserve and the away derby brought forward to play a week later on 17 January at Epping Stadium. Chidiac had completed quarantine and Thomas-Chinnama promoted for City's squad against Victory on 10 January. Rhali Dobson was also set to play her 100th W-League match in this home derby. The home derby resulted in a 6–0 defeat, ultimately making it City's worst defeat in club history and dropping down to seventh place. The next day saw the signing of Norwegian midfielder Noor Eckhoff for the remainder of the season. With the chance for redemption against the Victory the next week after the heavy defeat, City won the away derby 3–2 to record their first win of the season and move them back up a spot to sixth place.

On 19 January, a double-header was announced with the women's side to play Brisbane Roar at AAMI Park on 31 January. Lia Muldeary and Julia Sardo were both promoted in City's squad to take on Adelaide United away on 21 January. City lost to Adelaide 2–1; with a consolation goal for Checker but still falling short and dropping again to seventh place. In ten days time until City's clash with Brisbane at AAMI Park, McCormick returned from injury and Eckhoff completed quarantine coming into the squad to face Brisbane, but Muldeary was unavailable due to hamstring injury. The match despite City coming back to draw from 2–0 down, had Brisbane win 3–2 for another loss for City. City finished their first two months of the campaign with just one win, one draw and four losses; four points total in the first six matches.

=== February ===
Another fixture change had City's home match against the Perth Glory, changed to play Sydney FC instead due to Perth's five-day COVID-19 lockdown. Margot Robbine was another new promotion and Samantha Johnson out due to injury for City's squad to face Sydney on 4 February. On the day before the match against Sydney, the match was to again not be played at Frank Holohan Reserve due to playing surface concerns and was moved to play at AAMI Park behind closed doors. City lost 2–0 to Sydney with the deadlock still at half-time, but Sydney more clinical in the second half. On 10 February, a venue change of City's home match against the Newcastle Jets was to move from Frank Holohan Reserve to CB Smith Reserve and to be played on 13 February.

Palmer and Cain both returned from injury as well as Johnson returning from suspension, but Vlajnic out due to suspension for City's squad to face Newcastle that would have been on 13 February. The match against Newcastle was postponed due to Victoria's five-day COVID-19 lockdown until 17 February. The remaining fixtures for the campaign were released on 17 February; none of which were to be postponed. After two byes since City's last match against Sydney and dropping down to eighth place, their squad to face Western Sydney Wanderers on 25 February had Muldeary return from injury and Sardo not selected. City's losing streak continued with a 1–0 loss to Western Sydney keeping City at eighth place spot.

=== March ===
With four matches remaining for City, after a bye in Round 11, proved City out of reach to the Finals series. After works from ground staff of Frank Holohan Reserve, the venue was confirmed to host two of City's home matches against the Western Sydney Wanderers on 11 March and Perth Glory on 25 March, and Kingston Heath Soccer Complex to host City's other home match on 14 March. Allen returned from injury and Vlajnic returned from suspension, and Withers out due to ankle injury for City's squad to face Western Sydney on 11 March. Micah prior to the match was out due to knee injury, meaning Barbieri was to start and play her first game for City since 2017. City lost again to Western Sydney; this time 0–4 at home in what would be their last loss of the season.

With just three days time until City's next match at home against Newcastle, the club signed Sophia Varley on 13 March following Micah's knee injury. and finally win to end their five match losing streak; 1–0 against Newcastle thanks to Kira. With just Palmer promoted to City's squad to face Perth away at Dorrien Gardens on 19 March, City won back-to-back matches; defeating Perth 1–0 via Dobson to move City back up to seventh place in what was also Checker's 100th W-League game. For City's final match of the season this time at home to Perth, Withers returned from injury and Allen unavailable due to foot injury. The day after the squad announcement, Dobson officially retired from her W-League career. City won 2–1 against Perth to finish the season with three consecutive wins after five consecutive losses, as well as it being Dobson's final match also involved her partner with an engagement proposal and said yes.

This season resulted in City's worst season finishing seventh out of nine, with four wins, one draw and seven losses and missing out on the Finals series for just the second time in club history.

== Players ==
=== First-team squad ===
Note: Flags indicate national team as defined under FIFA eligibility rules; some limited exceptions apply. Players may hold more than one non-FIFA nationality.

No.	Pos.	Nation	Player
1	GK	AUS	Teagan Micah
2	DF	AUS	Teigen Allen
5	DF	AUS	Tori Tumeth
6	MF	NOR	Noor Eckhoff
7	DF	AUS	Julia Sardo
8	MF	AUS	Hollie Palmer
9	MF	AUS	Alex Chidiac
10	FW	JPN	Chinatsu Kira
11	FW	AUS	Rhali Dobson
12	FW	AUS	Harriet Withers

No.	Pos.	Nation	Player
13	MF	AUS	Sarah Cain
14	MF	FRA	Margot Robinne
15	DF	AUS	Emma Checker
17	DF	USA	Samantha Johnson
18	MF	AUS	Leah Davidson
19	DF	SRB	Tyla-Jay Vlajnic
20	MF	AUS	Lia Muldeary
21	DF	AUS	Jenna McCormick
22	DF	AUS	Naomi Thomas-Chinnama
23	GK	AUS	Melissa Barbieri

== Transfers ==
=== Transfers in ===
No.	Position	Player	Transferred from	Type/fee	Contract length	Date	Ref.
1	GK	Teagan Micah	(Norway) Arna-Bjørnar	Free transfer	1 year	25 November 2020	
8	MF	Hollie Palmer	Brisbane Roar	Free transfer	1 year	25 November 2020	
18	MF	Leah Davidson	Brisbane Roar	Free transfer		26 November 2020	
7	DF	Julia Sardo	Perth Glory	Free transfer		27 November 2020	
17	DF	(United States) Samantha Johnson	Retirement	Undisclosed fee	1 year	28 November 2020	
2	DF	Teigen Allen	Melbourne Victory	Free transfer	1 year	29 November 2020	
5	DF	Tori Tumeth	(Australia) Sydney University	Free transfer		30 November 2020	
21	DF	Jenna McCormick	Unattached	Free transfer	1 year	10 December 2020	
10	FW	(Japan) Chinatsu Kira	(Japan) Urawa Red Diamonds	Free transfer		21 December 2020	
13	MF	Sarah Cain	Unattached	Free transfer		27 December 2020	
9	MF	Alex Chidiac	Unattached	Free transfer		27 December 2020	
22	DF	Naomi Thomas-Chinnama	Unattached	Free transfer		27 December 2020	
14	MF	(France) Margot Robinne	Unattached	Free transfer		27 December 2020	
20	MF	Lia Muldeary	Unattached	Free transfer		27 December 2020	
12	FW	Harriet Withers	Unattached	Free transfer		27 December 2020	
6	MF	(Norway) Noor Eckhoff	(Norway) Kolbotn	Free transfer	3 months	12 January 2021	
30	GK	Sophia Varley	(Australia) FFV NTC	Injury replacement loan	1 month	12 March 2021	

=== Transfers out ===
No.	Position	Player	Transferred from	Type/fee	Date	Ref.
2	MF	(Japan) Yukari Kinga	(Japan) Orca Kamogawa	Free transfer	1 February 2020	
3	MF	(United States) Lauren Barnes	(Japan) Orca Kamogawa	Loan return	13 February 2020	
22	FW	(United States) Ally Watt	(United States) North Carolina Courage	Loan return	23 March 2020	
10	MF	Emily van Egmond	(United States) Orlando Pride	Loan return	23 March 2020	
9	FW	(Scotland) Claire Emslie	(United States) Orlando Pride	Loan return	23 March 2020	
21	DF	Ellie Carpenter	(United States) Portland Thorns	Loan return	24 March 2020	
7	DF	Steph Catley	(England) Arsenal	Undisclosed fee	2 July 2020	
17	FW	Kyah Simon	(Netherlands) PSV	Free transfer	4 July 2020	
1	GK	Lydia Williams	(England) Arsenal	Free transfer	8 July 2020	
6	DF	Aivi Luik	(Spain) Sevilla	Free transfer	30 July 2020	
13	DF	(New Zealand) Rebekah Stott	(England) Brighton & Hove Albion	Undisclosed fee	28 August 2020	
18	FW	Katherine Goff	(Australia) Gold Coast United	Free transfer	4 September 2020	
20	MF	(Serbia) Milica Mijatović	(Cyprus) Apollon Limassol	Free transfer	29 September 2020	
8	MF	Nia Stamatopoulos	(Australia) Alamein	Free transfer	5 November 2020	
—	FW	Maja Markovski	Melbourne Victory	Free transfer	4 December 2020	
11	FW	Rhali Dobson	Retired		25 March 2021	

=== Contract extensions ===
No.	Position	Player	Duration	Date	Ref.
11	FW	Rhali Dobson	1 year	26 November 2020	
4	DF	Chelsea Blissett	1 year	1 December 2020	
23	GK	Melissa Barbieri	1 year	3 December 2020	
19	DF	Tyla-Jay Vlajnic	1 year	8 December 2020	
15	DF	Emma Checker	1 year	21 December 2020	

== Pre-season and friendlies ==
Win Draw Loss

19 December 2020	Melbourne City (Australia)	3–3	(Australia) Melbourne Victory	Melbourne
	Iermano 28'; Tumeth 72'; Dobson ?'	Report	(unknown) 2', 27', ?'	Stadium: City Football Academy

== Competitions ==
=== Overall record ===
Competition	First match	Last match	Starting round	Final position	Record							
Competition	First match	Last match	Starting round	Final position	Pld	W	D	L	GF	GA	GD	Win %
W-League	29 December 2020	25 March 2021	Matchday 1	7th	12	4	1	7	11	23	−12	33.33
Total					12	4	1	7	11	23	−12	33.33

Source: Soccerway

=== W-League ===
==== Results summary ====
Overall								Home						Away					
Pld	W	D	L	GF	GA	GD	Pts	W	D	L	GF	GA	GD	W	D	L	GF	GA	GD
12	4	1	7	11	23	−12	13	2	0	4	5	16	−11	2	1	3	6	7	−1

Source: KEEPUP

==== Results by round ====
Round	1	2	3	4	5	6	7	8	9	10	11	12	12	13	14
Ground	A	A	H	A	A	H	H	B	B	A	B	H	H	A	H
Result	D	L	L	W	L	L	L	X	X	L	X	L	W	W	W
Position	3	6	7	6	7	7	7	7	8	8	8	8	8	7	7
Points	1	1	1	4	4	4	4	4	4	4	4	4	7	10	13

Source: KEEPUP
A = Away; H = Home; B = Bye; W = Win; D = Draw; L = Loss; X = Bye

==== League table ====
Pos	Team	Pld	W	D	L	GF	GA	GD	Pts	Qualification
1	Sydney FC	12	9	1	2	26	11	+15	28	Qualification to Finals series
2	Brisbane Roar	12	7	4	1	29	12	+17	25	Qualification to Finals series
3	Melbourne Victory (C)	12	7	2	3	25	14	+11	23	Qualification to Finals series
4	Canberra United	12	6	4	2	21	16	+5	22	Qualification to Finals series
5	Adelaide United	12	7	1	4	22	18	+4	22	
6	Western Sydney Wanderers	12	4	1	7	13	21	−8	13	
7	Melbourne City	12	4	1	7	11	23	−12	13	
8	Newcastle Jets	12	2	1	9	14	21	−7	7	
9	Perth Glory	12	0	1	11	7	32	−25	1	

Source: A-Leagues
Rules for classification: 1) points; 2) goal difference; 3) number of goals scored.
(C) Champions

==== Matches ====
The league fixtures were announced on 30 November 2020.

Win Draw Loss

29 December 2020 1	Brisbane Roar	0–0	Melbourne City	Brisbane
15:35 AEST		Report		Stadium: Kayo Stadium; Attendance: 1,174; Referee: Rebecca Durcau
Note: Match originally set to play Sydney FC away at ANZ Stadium scheduled for 30 December, but scrapped due to COVID-19 outbreaks in New South Wales. It was replaced by Brisbane Roar away at Dolphin Stadium rescheduled to 29 December.

3 January 2021 2	Canberra United	2–1	Melbourne City	Canberra
16:05 AEDT	Heyman 73'; Flannery 90+3'	Report	McCormick 77'	Stadium: Viking Park; Attendance: 1,398; Referee: Casey Reibelt
Note: Match originally scheduled for 10 January, but rescheduled due to travel restrictions and border closures based on the COVID-19 pandemic in the Australian Capital Territory. It was rescheduled to 3 January.

10 January 2021 3	Melbourne City	0–6	Melbourne Victory	Melbourne
16:05 AEDT		Report	Longo 15'; Ayres 29'; De Vanna 72'; Jackson 80'; Zimmerman 90'; Cooney-Cross 90+2'	Stadium: CB Smith Reserve; Attendance: 729; Referee: Lachlan Keevers
Note: Match originally scheduled for 28 January, but rescheduled to 10 January at Frank Holohan Soccer Complex. Match was then changed to take place at CB Smith Reserve, due to considerable damages of the Frank Holohan Soccer Complex pitch.

17 January 2021 4	Melbourne Victory	2–3	Melbourne City	Melbourne
16:05 AEDT	Melinda Barbieri 47'; Zimmerman 51'	Report	Chidiac 22'; Bunge 25' (o.g.); Withers 86'	Stadium: Epping Stadium; Attendance: 1,034; Referee: Danielle Anderson
Note: Match originally scheduled for 27 February, but rescheduled to 17 January.

21 January 2021 5	Adelaide United	2–1	Melbourne City	Adelaide
16:35 ACDT	Holmes 31', 53'	Report	Checker 90+3'	Stadium: Marden Sports Complex; Attendance: 912; Referee: Isabella Blaess
Note: Match originally scheduled for 26 March, but rescheduled to 21 January.

31 January 2021 6	Melbourne City	2–3	Brisbane Roar	Melbourne
16:05 AEDT	Chidiac 46'; Johnson 73' (pen.)	Report	Polkinghorne 23'; Gielnik 31' (pen.); Hecher 75'	Stadium: AAMI Park; Attendance: 1,975; Referee: Casey Reibelt
Note: Match originally scheduled for 7 March, but rescheduled to 31 January at AAMI Park.

4 February 2021 7	Melbourne City	0–2	Sydney FC	Melbourne
19:05 AEDT		Report	Siemsen 51'; Tobin 75'	Stadium: AAMI Park; Attendance: 0 (behind closed doors); Referee: Isabella Blaess
Note: Match originally set to play Perth Glory home, but scrapped due to Perth's five-day COVID-19 lockdown. It was replaced by Sydney FC home. Match was then changed to take place at AAMI Park behind closed doors, due to considerable damages of the Frank Holohan Soccer Complex pitch and player welfare.

25 February 2021 10	Western Sydney Wanderers	1–0	Melbourne City	Sydney
19:05 AEDT	Khamis 72'	Report		Stadium: Blacktown Football Park 1 Attendance: 334; Referee: Isabella Blaess

11 March 2021 12	Melbourne City	0–4	Western Sydney Wanderers	Melbourne
19:05 AEDT		Report	Henry 12', 26'; Galea 82', 90+3'	Stadium: Frank Holohan Reserve; Attendance: 547; Referee: Casey Reibelt

14 March 2021 12	Melbourne City	1–0	Newcastle Jets	Melbourne
16:05 AEDT	Kira 42'	Report		Stadium: Kingston Heath Soccer Complex; Attendance: 326; Referee: Isabella Libri

19 March 2021 13	Perth Glory	0–1	Melbourne City	Perth
18:35 AWST		Report	Dobson 67'	Stadium: Dorrien Gardens; Attendance: 271; Referee: Kelly Jones

25 March 2021 14	Melbourne City	2–1	Perth Glory	Melbourne
19:05 AEDT	Dobson 63'; Chidiac 79'	Report	Charalambous 90+5'	Stadium: Frank Holohan Reserve; Attendance: 454; Referee: Kate Jacewicz

== Statistics ==
=== Appearances and goals ===
Includes all competitions. Players with no appearances not included in the list.

No.	Pos.	Nat.	Name	W-League		Total	
No.	Pos.	Nat.	Name	Apps	Goals	Apps	Goals
1	GK	(Australia)	Teagan Micah	8	0	8	0
2	DF	(Australia)	Teigen Allen	4+2	0	6	0
5	DF	(Australia)	Tori Tumeth	11+1	0	12	0
6	MF	(Norway)	Noor Eckhoff	7	0	7	0
7	DF	(Australia)	Julia Sardo	0+2	0	2	0
8	MF	(Australia)	Hollie Palmer	8	0	8	0
9	MF	(Australia)	Alex Chidiac	9+1	3	10	3
10	FW	(Japan)	Chinatsu Kira	10+1	1	11	1
11	FW	(Australia)	Rhali Dobson	8+4	2	12	2
12	FW	(Australia)	Harriet Withers	4+4	1	8	1
13	MF	(Australia)	Sarah Cain	3+3	0	6	0
14	MF	(France)	Margot Robinne	2+3	0	5	0
15	DF	(Australia)	Emma Checker	8+1	1	9	1
17	DF	(United States)	Samantha Johnson	8+3	1	11	1
18	MF	(Australia)	Leah Davidson	12	0	12	0
19	DF	(Serbia)	Tyla-Jay Vlajnic	11	0	11	0
20	MF	(Australia)	Lia Muldeary	0+4	0	4	0
21	DF	(Australia)	Jenna McCormick	10	1	10	1
22	DF	(Australia)	Naomi Thomas-Chinnama	5+1	0	6	0
23	GK	(Australia)	Melissa Barbieri	4	0	4	0

=== Disciplinary record ===
Includes all competitions. The list is sorted by squad number when total cards are equal. Players with no cards not included in the list.

Rank	No.	Pos.	Nat.	Name	W-League			Total		
Rank	No.	Pos.	Nat.	Name	Booked	(yellow card) (yellow-red card)	Sent off (straight red)	Booked	(yellow card) (yellow-red card)	Sent off (straight red)
1	19	DF	(Serbia)	Tyla-Jay Vlajnic	1	0	1	1	0	1
2	17	DF	(United States)	Samantha Johnson	5	0	0	5	0	0
3	5	DF	(Australia)	Tori Tumeth	2	0	0	2	0	0
3	21	DF	(Australia)	Jenna McCormick	2	0	0	2	0	0
5	1	GK	(Australia)	Teagan Micah	1	0	0	1	0	0
5	2	DF	(Australia)	Teigen Allen	1	0	0	1	0	0
5	6	MF	(Norway)	Noor Eckhoff	1	0	0	1	0	0
5	9	MF	(Australia)	Alex Chidiac	1	0	0	1	0	0
5	10	FW	(Japan)	Chinatsu Kira	1	0	0	1	0	0
5	11	FW	(Australia)	Rhali Dobson	1	0	0	1	0	0
5	12	FW	(Australia)	Harriet Withers	1	0	0	1	0	0
5	15	DF	(Australia)	Emma Checker	1	0	0	1	0	0
5	18	MF	(Australia)	Leah Davidson	1	0	0	1	0	0
5	20	MF	(Australia)	Lia Muldeary	1	0	0	1	0	0
5	22	DF	(Australia)	Naomi Thomas-Chinnama	1	0	0	1	0	0
Total					21	0	1	21	0	1

=== Clean sheets ===
Includes all competitions. The list is sorted by squad number when total clean sheets are equal. Numbers in parentheses represent games where both goalkeepers participated and both kept a clean sheet; the number in parentheses is awarded to the goalkeeper who was substituted on, whilst a full clean sheet is awarded to the goalkeeper who was on the field at the start of play. Goalkeepers with no clean sheets not included in the list.

Rank	No.	Nat.	Goalkeeper	W-League	Total
1	23	(Australia)	Melissa Barbieri	2	2
2	1	(Australia)	Teagan Micah	1	1
Total				3	3
