= Floriade =

Floriade is the name of several flower events:

- Floriade (Canberra), a flower festival held annually in Canberra, Australia.
- Floriade (Netherlands), a large flower and gardening exhibition held every 10 years in the Netherlands.
