= Robinne =

Robinne is a French surname. Notable people with the surname include:

- Gabrielle Robinne (1886–1980), French actress
- Margot Robinne (born 1991), French footballer
