= National Multicultural Festival =

Community festival in Canberra

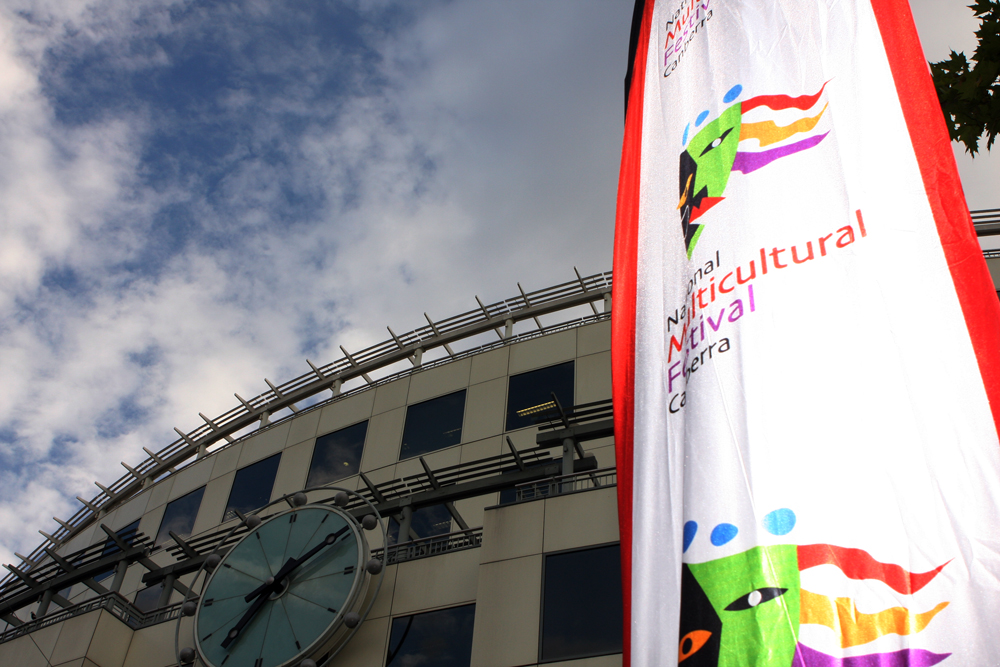
- Date: February
- Frequency: Annually
- Locations: Canberra, Australia
- Inaugurated: 1981
- Attendance: 260,000 (2013 estimated)
- Website: multiculturalfestival.com.au

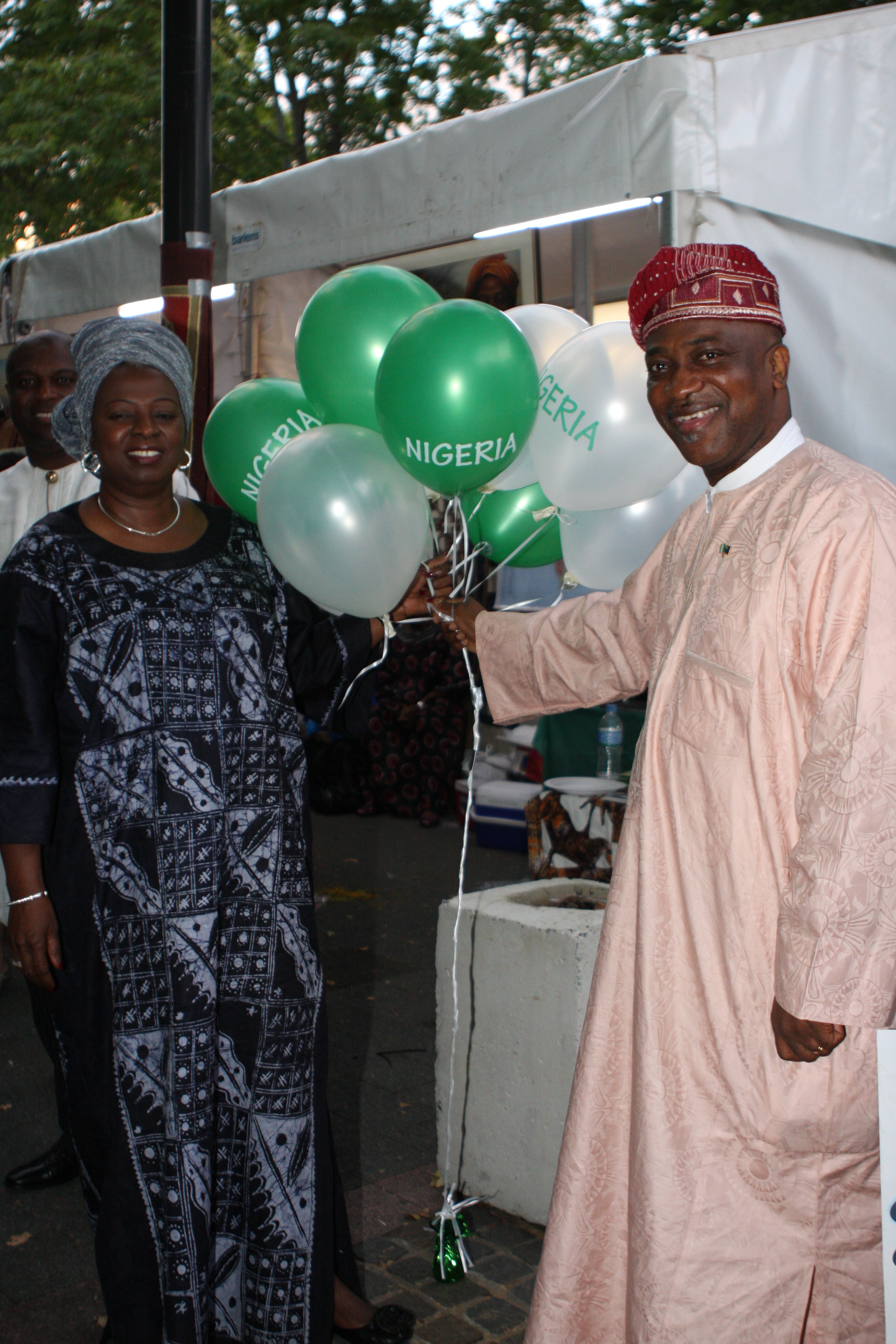
Nigerian attendants at the 2012 National Multicultural Festival in Canberra.

The National Multicultural Festival, also known as Multiculti or MultiCulti, is a free community festival held annually each February in Canberra, Australia.

The first festival celebrating cultural diversity was held in 1981 as a one-day event on Australia Day hosted by the ACT Ethnic Communities Council.

In 1996 the National Multicultural Festival in Canberra officially came into being. It began as a nod to the Capital's expanding cityscape, populated by young families with links across the globe, and blossomed throughout the 1990s and early 2000s to an event reflecting the more than 170 unique nationalities that comprise our population. The festival has become one of the most successful multicultural festivals in Australia. The festival is held over three days during February each year.

The Festival is supported by the ACT Government and is administered by the Community Participation Group, Multicultural Affairs, a division of the ACT Government Community Services Directorate.

== History ==
In 1981, the ACT Ethnic Communities Council held the first festival celebrating cultural diversity, a one-day event in Civic to celebrate Australia Day. By 1988, the festival had grown to host about 40 international food stalls, music and dancing. That year it was held in the Civic end of Ainslie Avenue, and along London Circuit in front of Civic Square, and also included a parade led by Chinese lion dancers.

In 1997, the newly established ACT Office of Multicultural Affairs staged the first week-long Festival as a means of celebrating Canberra and Australia's cultural diversity. In 2010, the Festival became a three-day event and remains that duration.

In 2012, the festival hosted a record 350 stalls. The 2012 festival was also the first to allow cultural kava use, as a trial. The ACT Government announced in 2013 that the kava trial had been a success and there would be a permanent lifting of the ban on the drink at the National Multicultural Festival.

The Out In Canberra People's Choice Awards in 2013 named the National Multicultural Festival Favourite Attraction and Event.

Weather at the festival is usually hot and dry, with organisers handing out 18,000 bottles of water to patrons at the 2014 festival.

The festival has grown over time to become one of the most successful multicultural festivals in Australia. The 2014 event reportedly injected $5 million into the ACT economy and contributed to an additional 10,000 overnight stays in Canberra by interstate and international visitors.

=== COVID-19 impact ===
In November 2020, the 2021 Festival was postponed from its usual February dates to "... by late 2021" due to the COVID-19 pandemic in Australia. In early 2021 the Festival for that year was cancelled entirely. It was then planned for the next event to be held on 18–20 February 2022, its 25th anniversary. However, the team planning the festival, which usually takes ten months to do so, was diverted for three months to the ACT's COVID-19 response, and consequently in November 2021 the 2022 festival was also cancelled, and deferred to February 2023.

== Fringe Festival ==
Between 2004 and 2009, the Fringe Festival was a free event forming part of the Multicultural Festival. In 2009, then Minister for Multicultural Affairs John Hargreaves announced that the Multicultural Festival would be reduced to a three-day event and the Fringe Festival moved to become a part of the National Folk Festival.

The 2013 National Multicultural Festival was the first to take place in conjunction with a fringe festival since 2009. The 2013 Fringe ran for just one night; its budget was allocated from ACT Government arts funding on a competitive basis.

In 2014 the Fringe Festival continued; that year, the Fringe Festival was directed by Jorian Gardner, who the ACT Arts and Multicultural Affairs Minister Joy Burch selected for the position without a competitive selection process. Jorian Gardner hosted, among other performances, a Hitler-themed burlesque strip-tease featuring a female dancer dressed as Hitler with gold wings performing to the song Gangnam Style. The performance attracted significant controversy, with ACT Opposition Leader Jeremy Hanson calling for Arts and Multicultural Minister Joy Burch to resign or be sacked for hiring the man who oversaw the performance, and opposition multicultural affairs spokesperson Giulia Jones labeling the performance offensive and racist.

== References and further reading ==
- Canberra Multicultural Community Forum Incorporated (July 2013), Community Consultation – Opportunities for future National Multicultural Festivals (PDF), Canberra Multicultural Community Forum Incorporated, archived from the original (PDF) on 5 March 2014
- Department of Disability, Housing and Community Services (2010), Evaluation of the 2010 National Multicultural Festival (PDF), ACT Government, archived from the original (PDF) on 2 March 2014
- "Thousands at multicultural festival". The Canberra Times. 30 January 1983. p. 3.
