= Handmade Canberra Market =

The Handmade Canberra Market is an Australian indoor market located at EPIC in Canberra. The market runs 4 events per year and is the only market in Canberra that is accredited with the Australian Made Campaign.

== History ==
The market was founded in 2008, being initially located at Albert Hall. It subsequently expanded and moved from there to the Yarralumla Woolshed, later to the Kamberra Wine Company and the National Convention Centre, before finally finding a permanent home at EPIC.

The market was also listed by Better Homes and Gardens as one of the best Art and Design Markets in Australia.

In 2010 the market started a bricks and mortar shop front called Shop Handmade, where stallholders from the market could lease shelf space in the shop to sell their products. The shop closed in 2016 due to redevelopment of the area.

In 2022, the market introduced a Low Sensory Shopping hour.

== Awards ==
Award	Sponsor	Notes
Start Up Award	Telstra Business Awards	Winner - Shop Handmade Canberra
Canberra Region Innovation & Resilience Award	Canberra Region Tourism Award	Winner - 2021 Canberra Region Innovation & Resilience Award
Canberra Region Innovation & Resilience Award	Canberra Region Tourism Award	Winner - 2022 Canberra Region Innovation & Resilience Award
