= Floriade (Canberra) =

Annual spring flower show in Canberra, Australia

Coordinates: 35.29°S 149.137°E

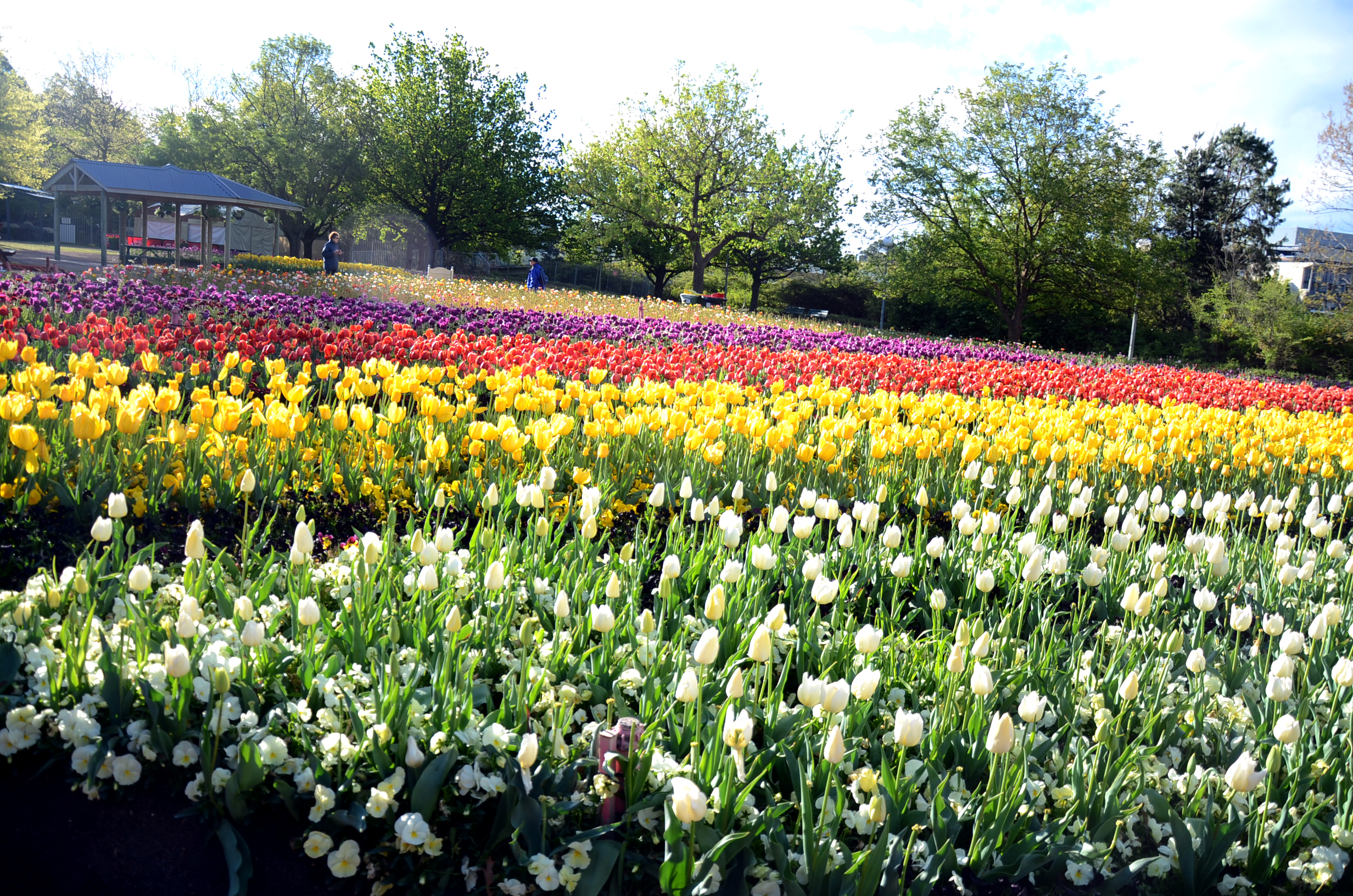
- Floriade in 2013
- Genre: Spring flower show and festival
- Date: September to October (Spring)
- Begins: 12 September 2026
- Ends: 11 October 2026
- Frequency: Annual
- Locations: Commonwealth Park, Canberra, Australia
- Inaugurated: 1988
- Most recent: 2026
- Website: https://floriadeaustralia.com/

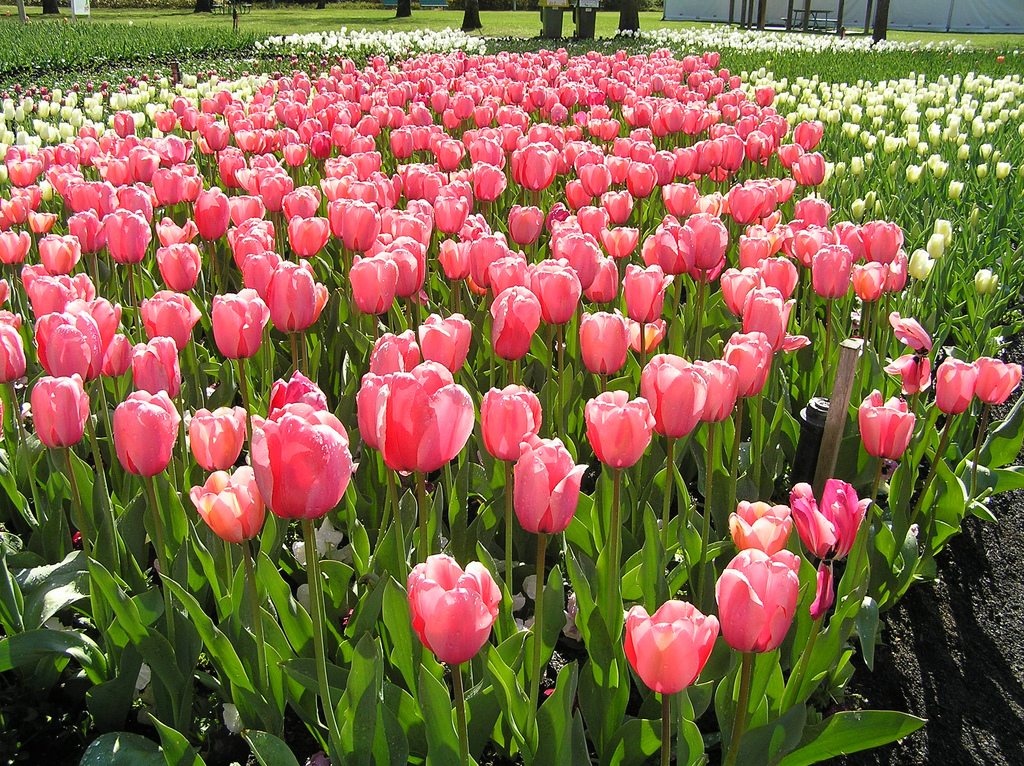
A glorious and extensive display of tulips is a highlight of Floriade

Floriade is a flower and entertainment festival held annually in Canberra's Commonwealth Park on the shores of Lake Burley Griffin. It features extensive displays of flowering bulbs with integrated sculptures and other artistic features. Floriade comes from the Latin word floriat, which means to design with flowers.

The festival attracts tourists from around Australia and overseas in spring from mid September to mid October each year, and is considered the most important regular event for tourism in the Australian Capital Territory. It is also called "Australia's Celebration of Spring". After some controversy regarding an entry charge, admission to Floriade has been free for a number of years. When the main event at Commonwealth Park was cancelled due to the COVID-19 pandemic in 2020, the plants were instead placed at over 100 separate sites across Canberra in an event dubbed Floriade: Reimagined. A similar flower distribution was planned for 2021 after the event was again cancelled.

== History ==
=== Origin ===
Floriade was the idea of Christiaan Slotemaker de Bruine, Landscape Architect with the Department of Capital Territory in Canberra. He commenced the design in 1986 and based it on the world famous 'Keukenhof' garden in The Netherlands. He orchestrated the construction with Peter Sutton, Holticulturist and Manager of Commonwealth Gardens. He arranged the marketing, sculptures, live music, the purchase of bulbs, entertainment, lifting of bulb quarantine quotas as well as the design. Together with Sutton, they built the design on the site of Commonwealth Park with the help of City Parks staff.

The design concept of the first event was 'multiculturalism of the Nation' and included Dutch and Aboriginal floral layouts. de Bruine obtained sponsorship from the Embassy of the Netherlands and the Bicentennial Authority. Sutton and de Bruine continued their successful partnership for the next two years, 1989 and 1990.

=== Chronology ===
Floriade started in 1988 as a one off celebration of Canberra's 75th birthday and Australia's Bicentenary of European settlement. Due to the success and popularity of the event it has run with a new theme every year, although in 2020 and 2021 the centralised event was cancelled due to the COVID-19 pandemic.

In 2020 due to the cancellation of the Commonwealth Park event, scheduled for 12 September to 11 October, the one million bulbs and annuals that would typically be on display were distributed over 130 different sites to create a Tulip Trail through Canberra's suburbs and city for Floriade: Reimagined. Around 300,000 of the plants were distributed to community groups and organisations, not-for-profits, sporting clubs, schools and early learning centres, as well as residents’ groups across Canberra.

In 2021 Floriade was again cancelled due to Covid restrictions on 21 August. Flowers that were to be displayed in Commonwealth Park were again distributed around Canberra as they were in 2020.

=== Floriade NightFest ===
From 1989 to the late 90s, "Floriade by Night" featured night time food, lighting displays, stalls and entertainment. It ran over several nights and was free. Night opening returned in 2008, now called NightFest, as a paid ticketed event. It includes live music, comedy and acrobatics performances, shopping, cocktails and movies.

== Name ==
When the first festival was announced in 1987, the word "floriade" was said to mean "to decorate with floral designs". According to a later version, "floriade" comes from a Latin verb form "floreat" which is derived from "floreo" meaning "to be decked or covered with flowers". Thus, "Floriade" is generally understood to mean "let it bloom".

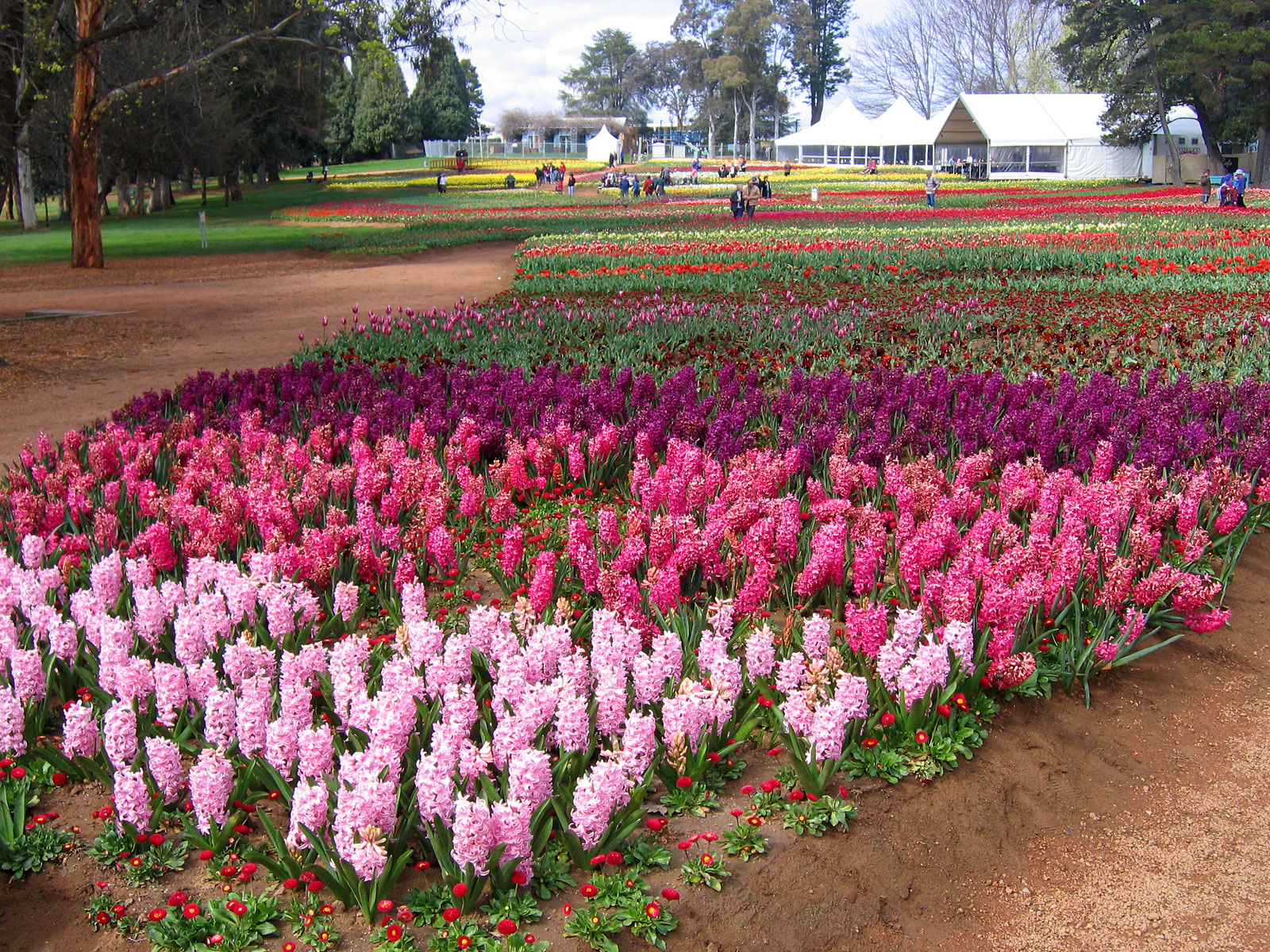
Floriade in 2005

In September 2005 ACT tourism authorities considered legal action over a trademark violation with Hunter Valley Gardens in New South Wales, who had renamed their annual floral festival to Floriade Hunter Valley Gardens. The term Floriade was replaced with Festival of Flowers in 2006.

== Public art and culture ==
Floriade gives expression to public art, each year commissioning works which are placed in the Floriade gardens. Some remain beyond the festival. Floriade also showcases musical displays with many live performances, cultural celebrations, artistic displays, entertainment and recreational activities.

Floriade has also held a gnome decorating competition and display for several years, with strong participation from schools, aged people's homes, and businesses.

For the first competition in 2000, 5'000 gnomes were mass produced and sold to raise funds for Koomari at a price of $5 each. The gnome known as Stanley Patches winning the first competition is stored at the Canberra Museum and Gallery.

Since 2005 the Floriade Gnome Gnoll has been managed by the Rotary Club of Canberra East, with proceeds going to local and overseas activities. The 2005 theme of Rock 'n Roll only accentuated the regular theme of decorating gnomes as the members of bands. Examples shown below are the Australian children's entertainers, The Wiggles, in this case renamed The Gniggles, and the crowd favourite, Kiss submitted by Weetangera Primary School.

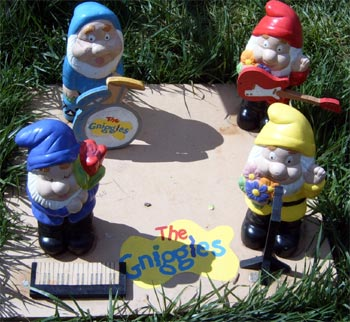
The Gniggles

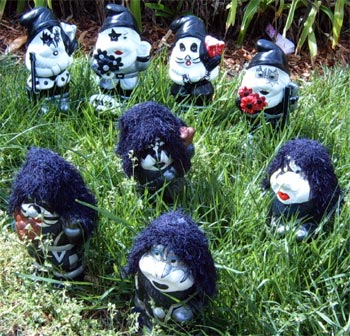
Kiss

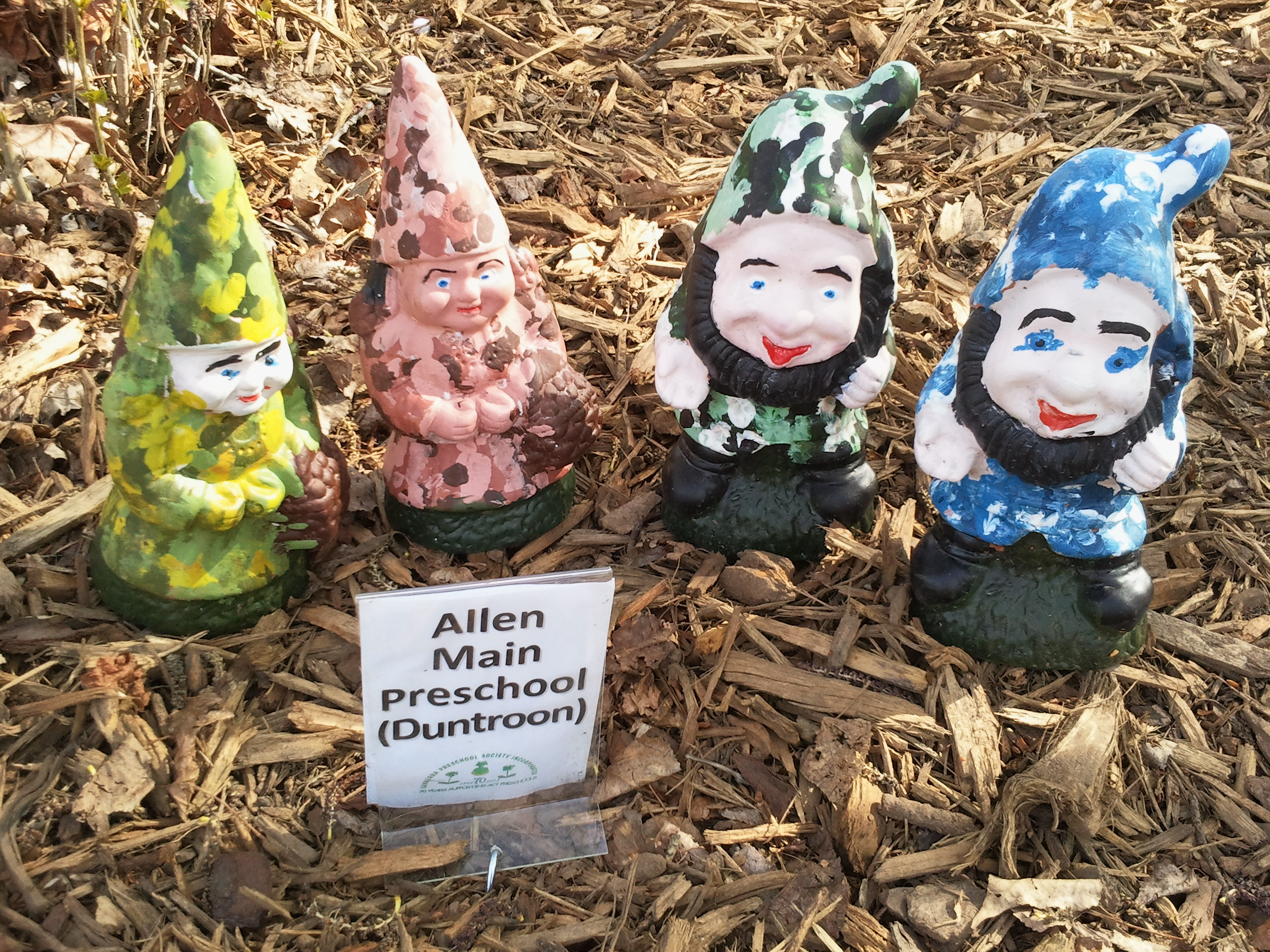
Camouflaged Gnomes painted by children of the Preschool at the Royal Military College, Duntroon, 2013

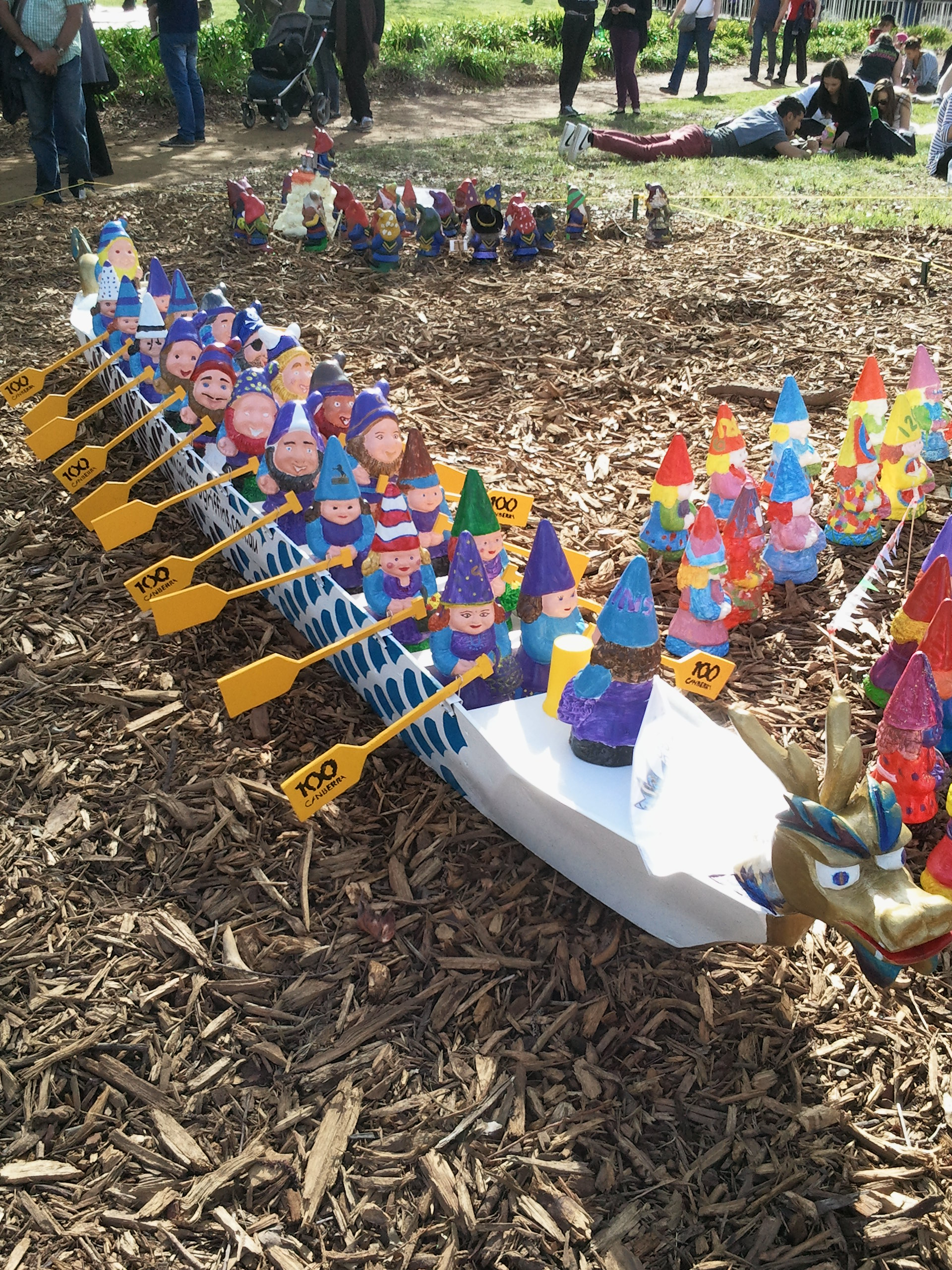
Dragon boat gnomes

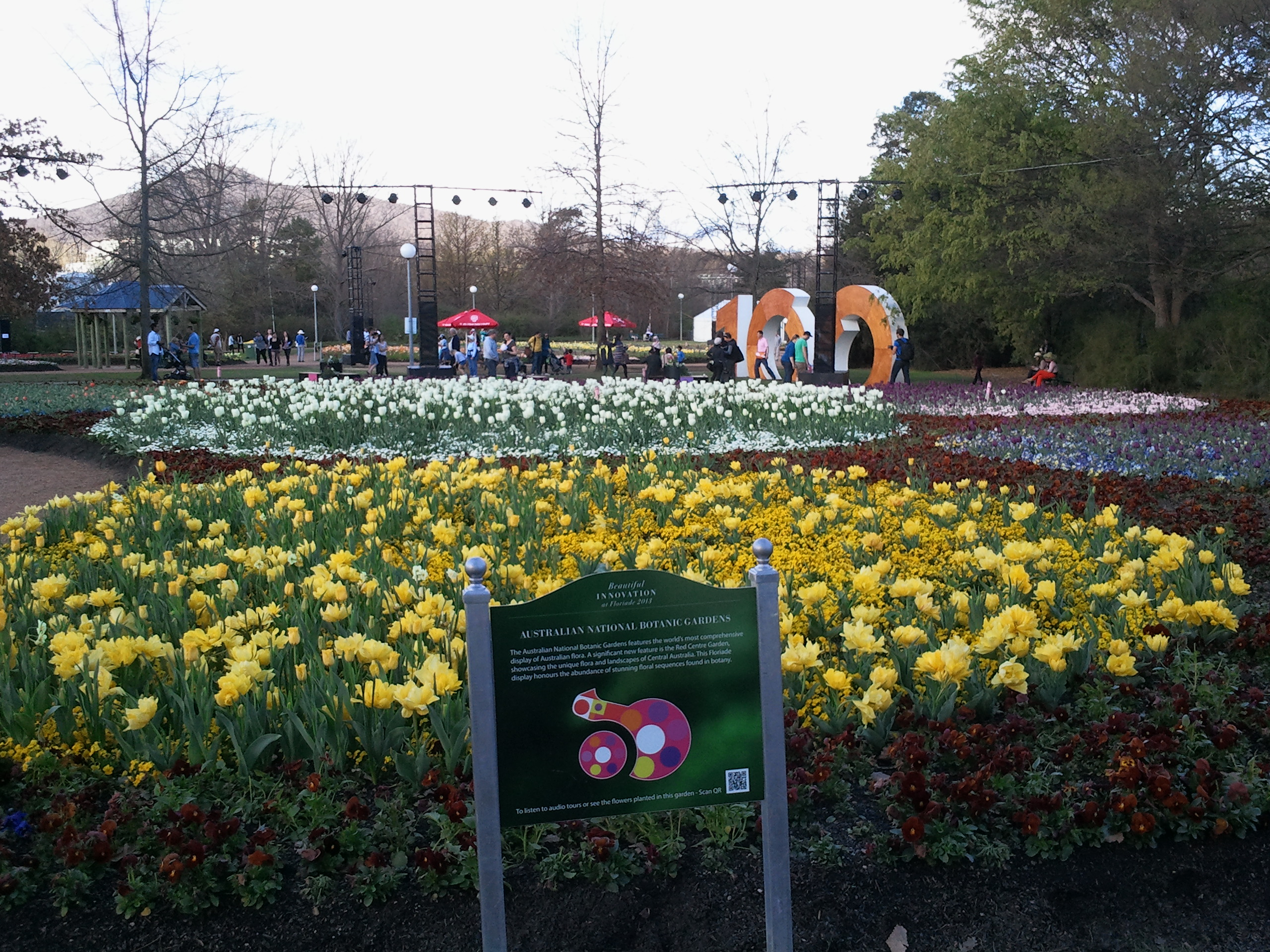
Canberra 100th Anniversary symbol, 2013

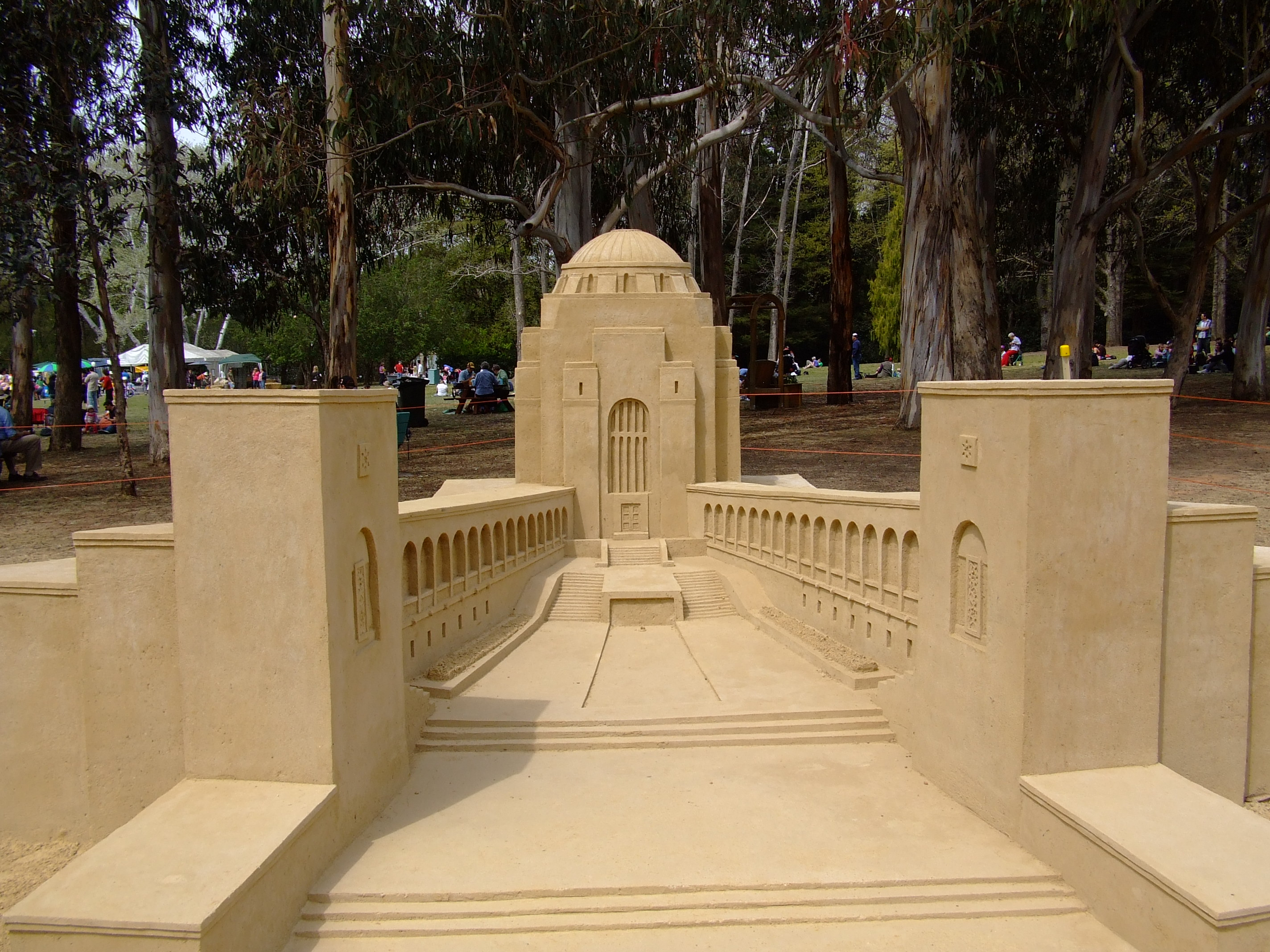
A picture of a sand Australian War Memorial at Floriade 2007, Canberra.

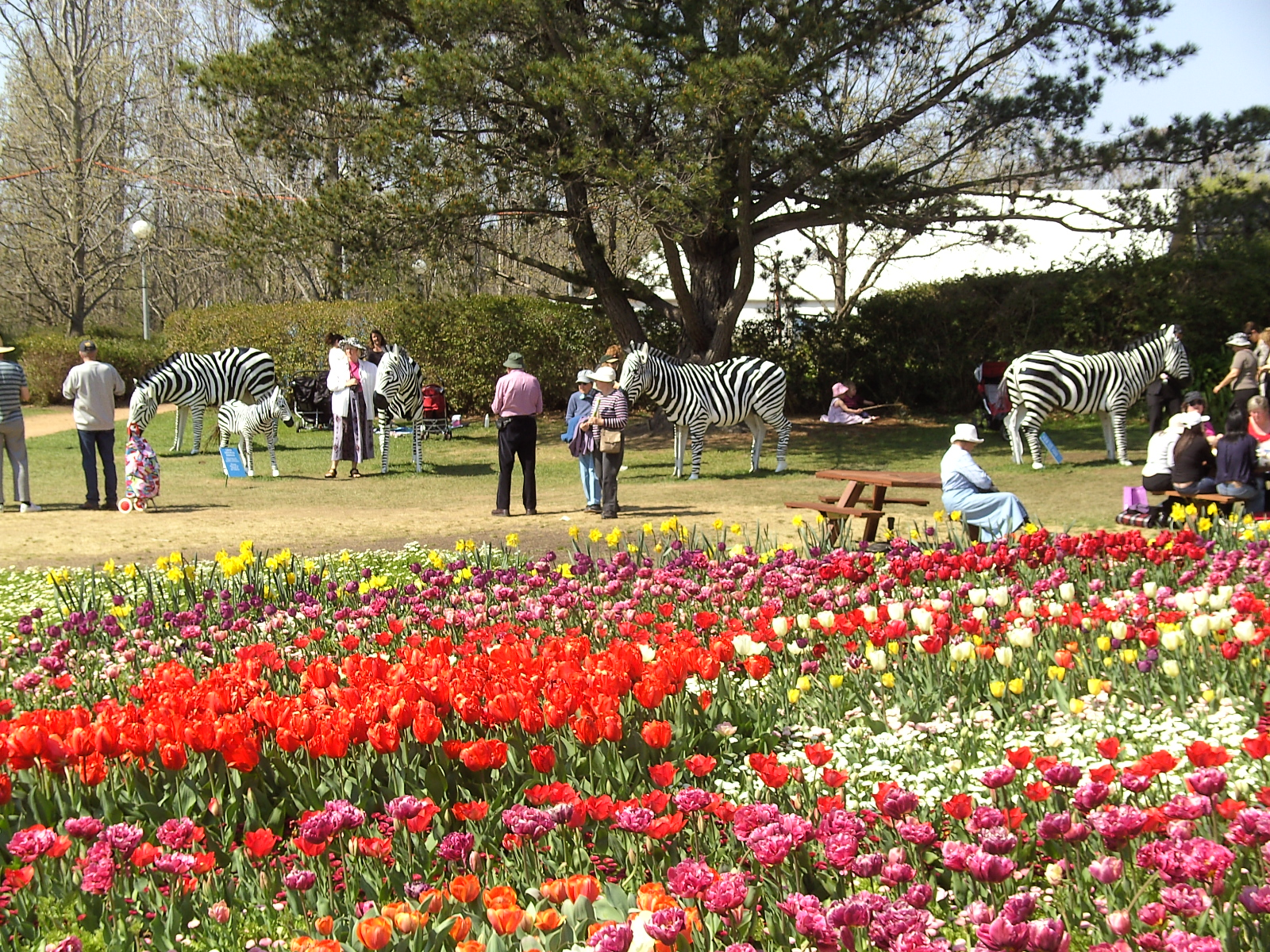
Zebras (2010): Stopper, Reviver, Survivor, Dasher, (named after the "Driver Reviver" stop at the Wheatley stop at Lake George where they were first installed) and the new baby, George.

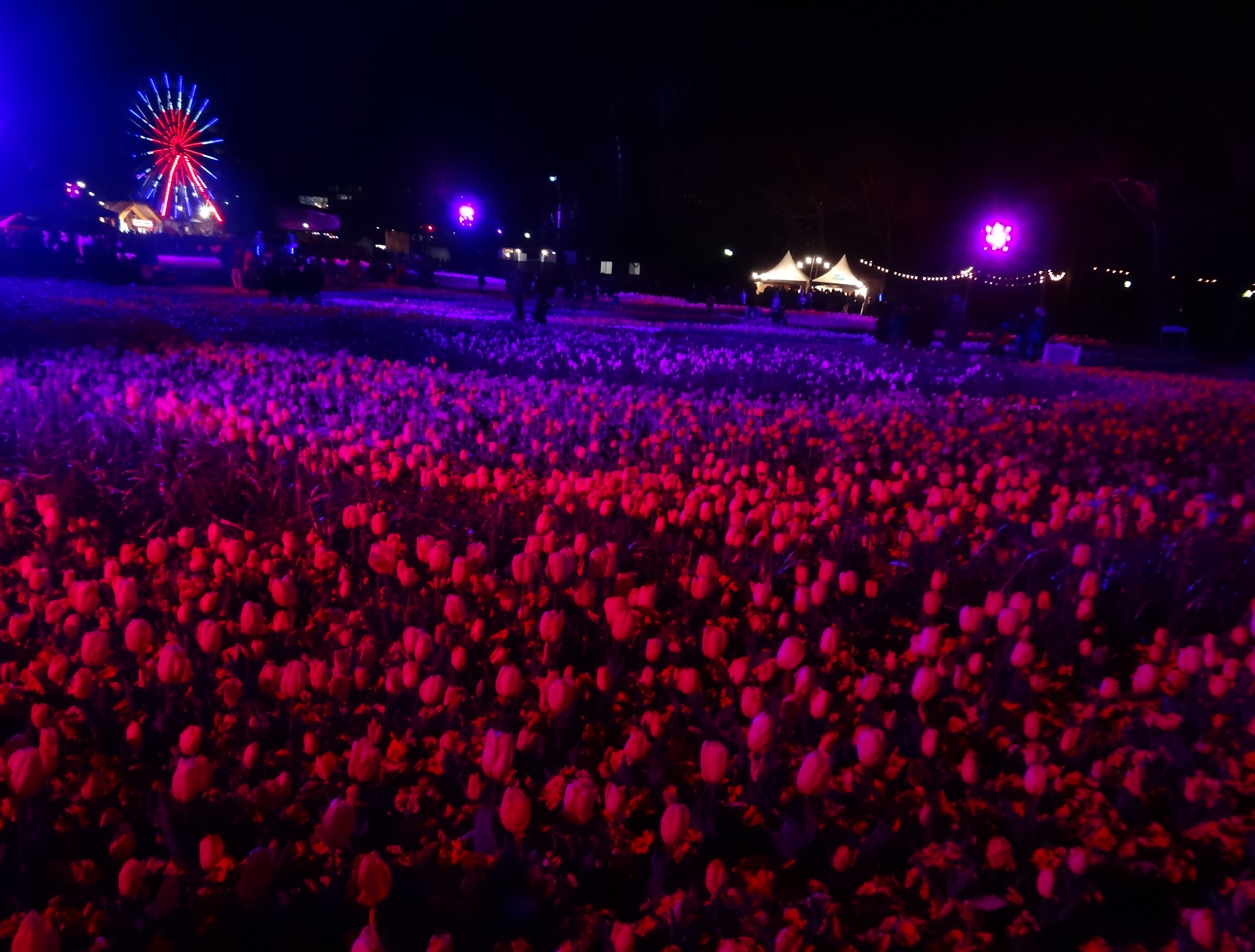
Massed tulips at Floriade at night

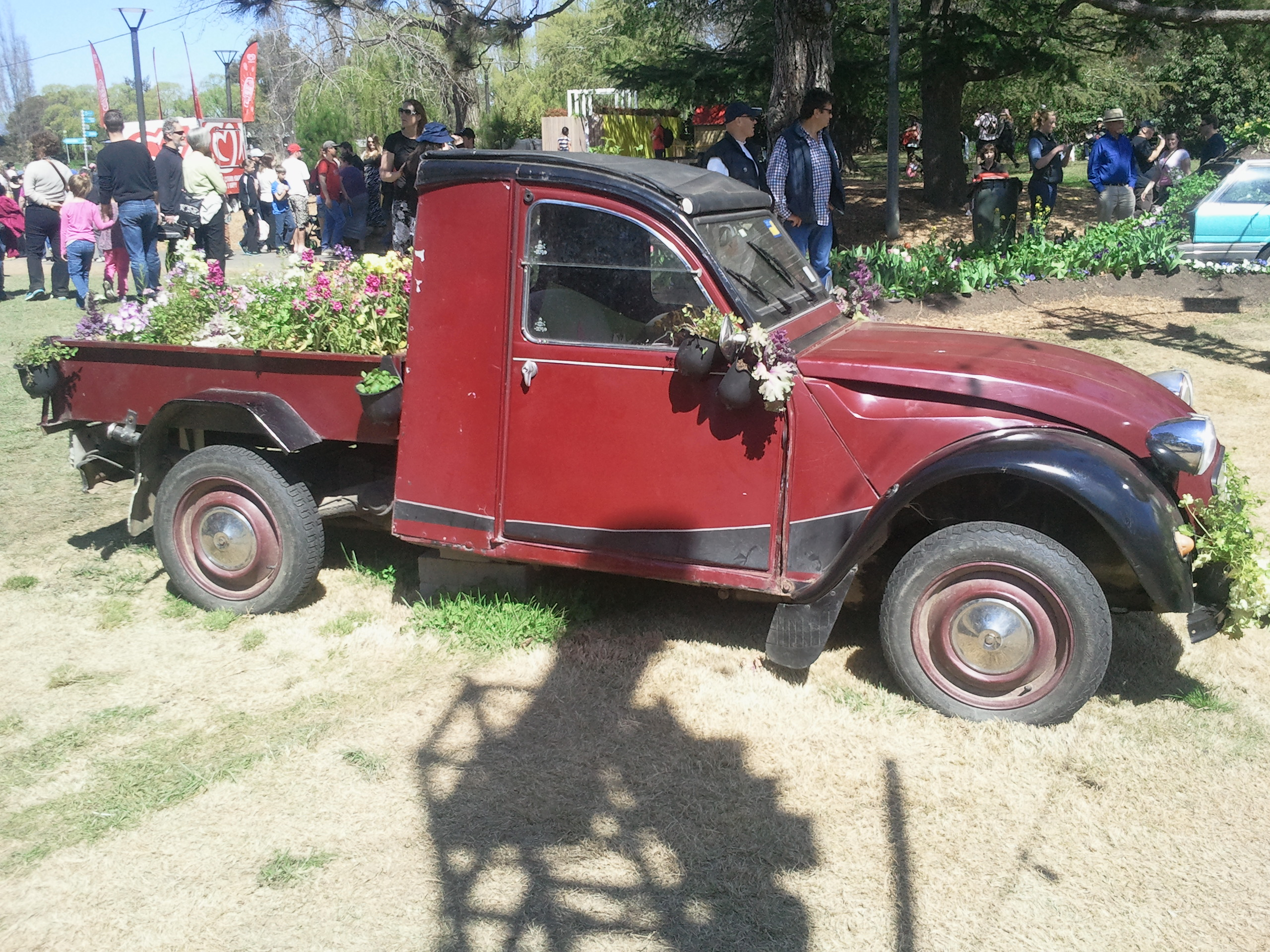
Citroën 2CV utility truck, being used as a garden, 2014

== Floriade themes ==
- 1988 Floriade (multiculturalism)
- 1989 Floriade (insects)
- 1990 Floral garlands, champagne bubbles and floral river
- 1991 Music
- 1992 The art of horticulture
- 1993 Kites, colour and movement
- 1994 Reflections
- 1995 Carnival of cultures
- 1996 Floriade celebrates the arts
- 1997 Colour by day and night
- 1998 Gardens and gourmets
- 1999 Magic of the gardens
- 2000 Games in the garden
- 2001 The Century in bloom (Celebrating Centenary of Federation)
- 2002 Poetry in flowers
- 2003 The heavens in bloom
- 2004 The wonder of water
- 2005 Rock 'n' roll in bloom
- 2006 Carnivale – The World on Show
- 2007 Aussie icons, myths and legends
- 2008 Films that shaped the nation
- 2009 Mind, Body and Soul
- 2010 Imagination
- 2011 A feast for the senses
- 2012 Style & Design
- 2013 Canberra Centenary
- 2014 Embrace Passion
- 2015 World War I remembrance
- 2016 Life in Bloom
- 2017 Carnival of Cultures
- 2018 Pop Culture
- 2019 World in Bloom
- 2020 Floriade Reimagined (Event not held in Commonwealth Park)
- 2021 Future of Flowers (Event not held in Commonwealth Park)
- 2022 The Sounds of Spring
- 2023 Floral Wonderland
- 2024 Art in Bloom
- 2025 Science and Nature
- 2026 Feast of Flowers

== Gallery ==
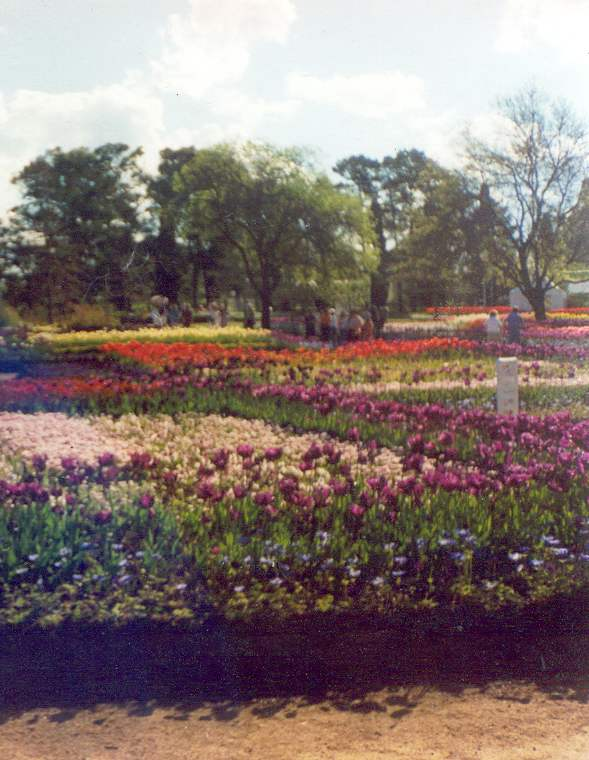
1997

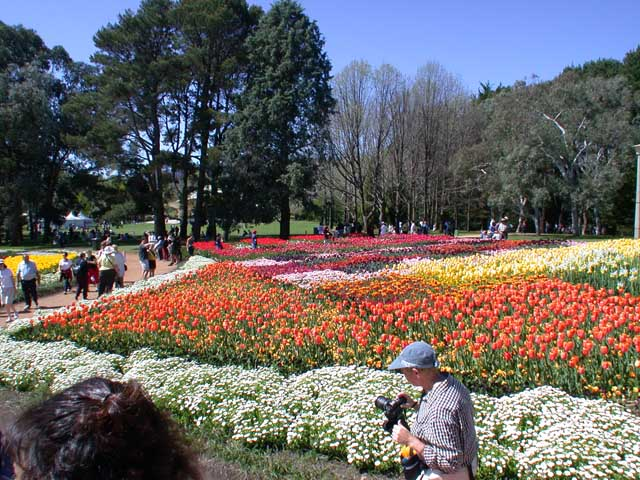
2001

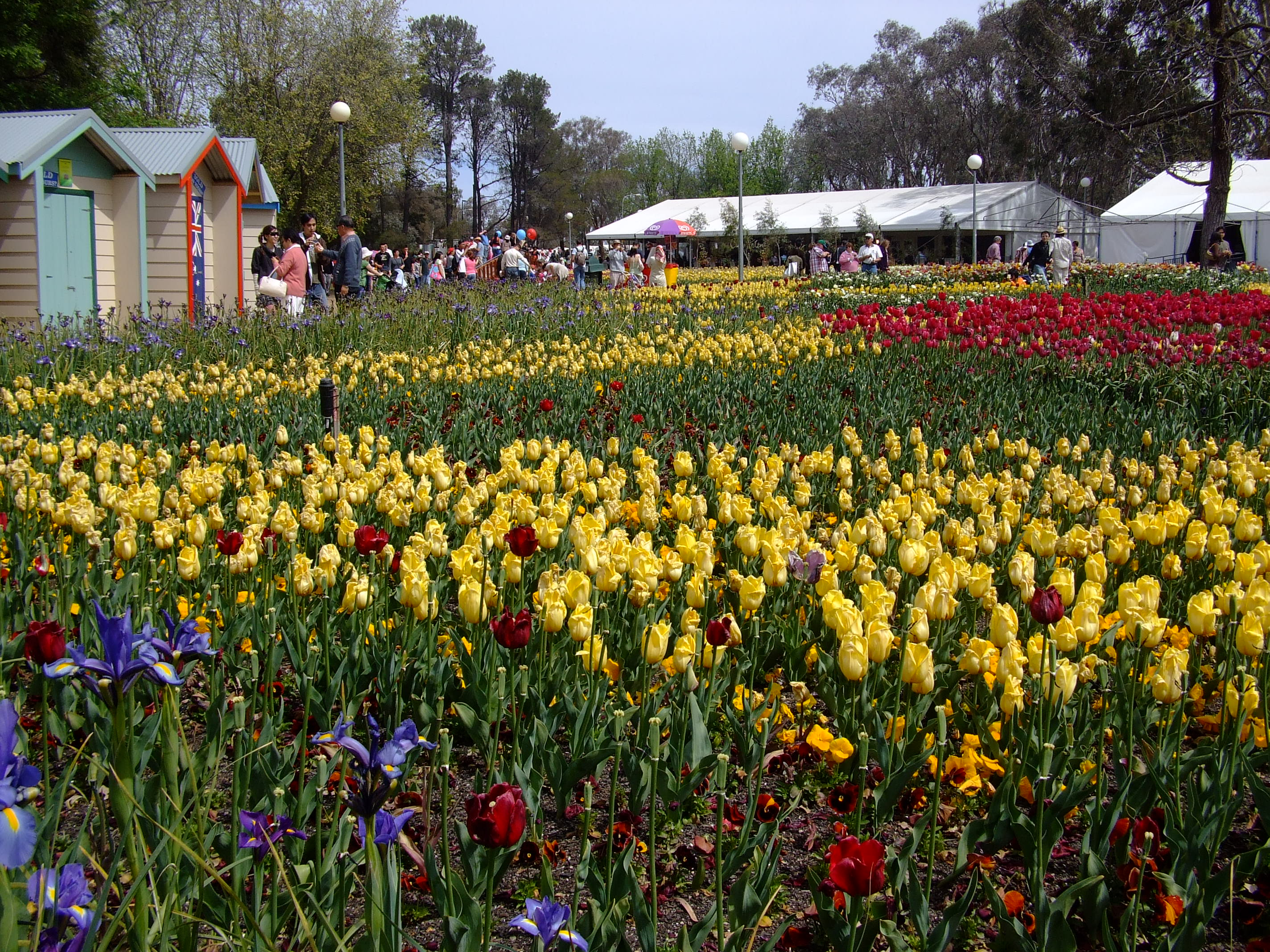
2007

2008

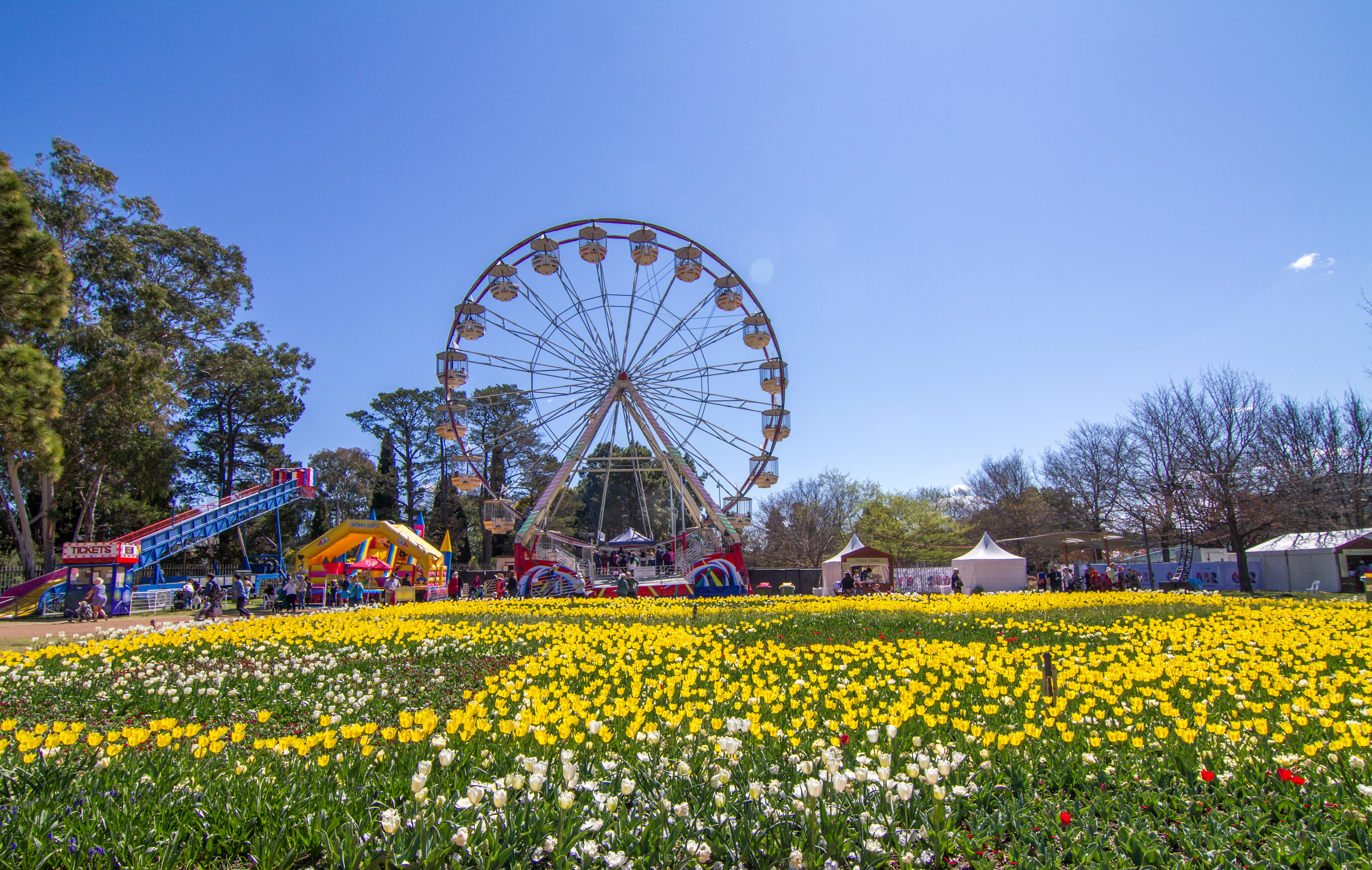
2015

== See also ==
Gardening in Australia

- Floriade in the Netherlands
- Keukenhof annual flower festival in the Netherlands
- Spring Festival
- List of festivals in Australia
