= Exhibition Park in Canberra =

- EPIC
- Logo of the park
- Interactive map of Exhibition Park in Canberra
- Location: 35.233071°S 149.145968°E
- Owner: ACT Government
- Operator: Exhibition Parks Corporation
- Type: Multi-Purpose Events Facility
- Acreage: 173
- Public transit: R1 EPIC and Racecourse

Construction
- Groundbreaking: 1976

Website
- http://www.exhibitionparkincanberra.com

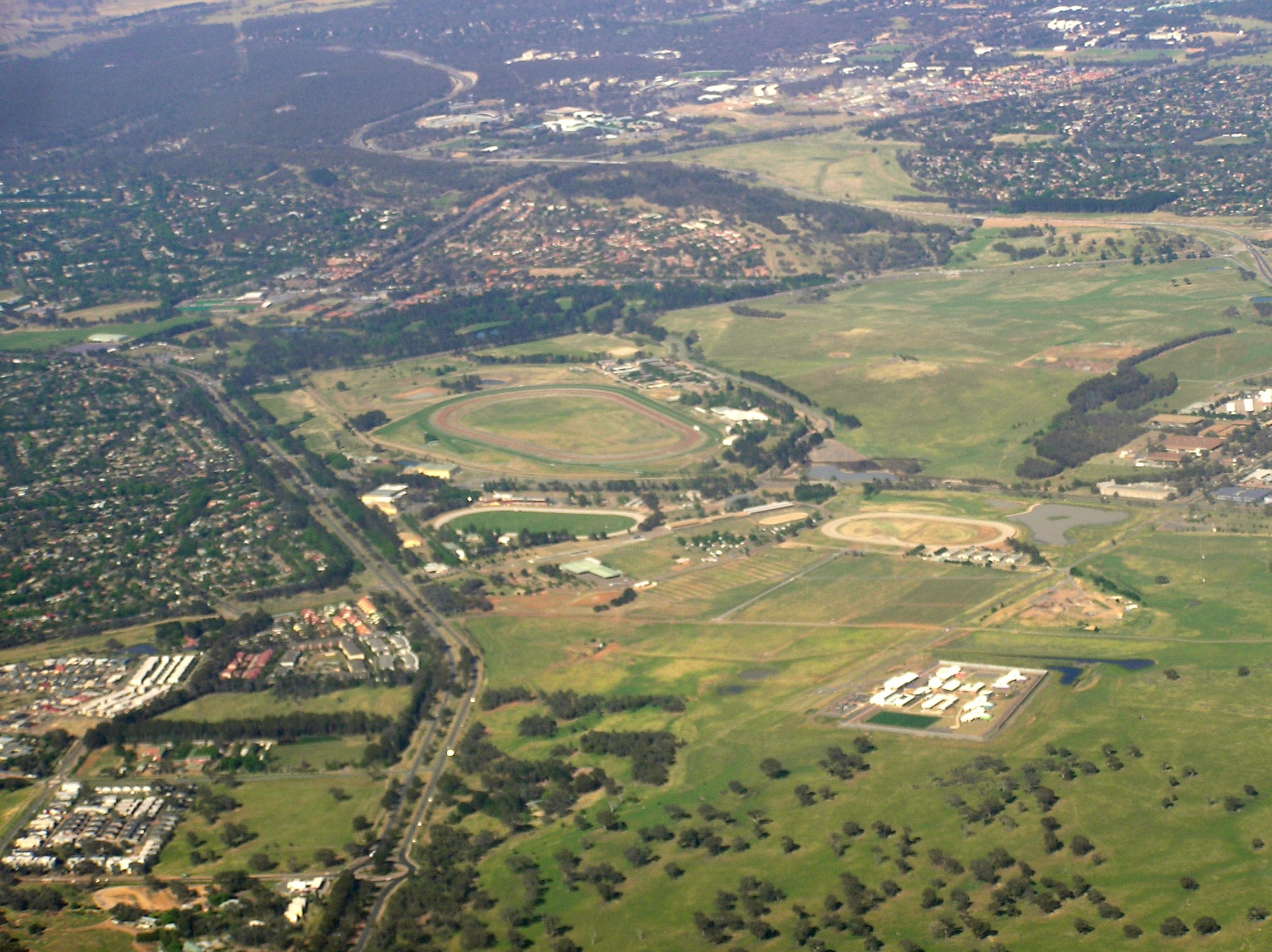
{{{caption}}}

Exhibition Park in Canberra (EPIC) is a 70 hectare showground and multi-building venue for exhibitions, conferences, and events located in the suburb of Lyneham (though commonly listed in the adjacent Mitchell) in Canberra, Australia.

== Regular events ==
There are a number of events held regularly at EPIC but in 2020, and into 2021 many were postponed, cancelled or changed in format as a result of crowd and travel restrictions imposed during the COVID-19 pandemic in Australia.

- Summernats, an annual four-day car festival, at the beginning of January.
- Cancon, an annual games convention, over the Australia Day long weekend.
- The Royal Canberra Show, in late February.
- The National Folk Festival (Australia), over the Easter long weekend.
- The Capital Region Farmers Market, weekly.
- The Lifeline Bookfair, a biannual fundraising book fair
- The Canberra leg of Groovin' the Moo, an annual music festival held in regional centres (since 2019)
- The Handmade Canberra Market, held four times per year.
