= National Folk Festival (Australia) =

Music festival in Canberra, Australia

Coordinates: 35.231°S 149.147°E

The National Folk Festival (NFF) is held every year at Easter in the Australian capital, Canberra.

First held in Melbourne in 1967, from 1969 the NFF was held in various states in city and regional venues. Since 1992 the festival has been staged at Exhibition Park in Canberra (EPIC) at Easter from Holy Thursday to Easter Monday. It was cancelled in 2020 due to the COVID-19 pandemic in Australia, and in 2021 was held as a two-day event dubbed "Good Folk" at venues spread across Queanbeyan in New South Wales. It returned to its normal location and timing in 2022.

== History ==
The festival was first held at the Melbourne Teachers' College on the weekend of 11–12 February 1967. It was then known as the "Port Phillip District Folk Music Festival". Initiated by the Victorian Folk Music Club, the Monash Traditional Music Society, the Burwood Teachers Folk Club and performers Martyn Wyndham-Read and Glen Tomasetti, it was inspired by the Newport Folk Festival in the United States. From 1969 until 1991 the festival travelled interstate each year. It was hosted at least once in Melbourne, Sydney, Adelaide, Canberra, Brisbane, Fremantle, Alice Springs, Adelaide, Kuranda and Maleny. From 1988 to 1992 organising groups had heavy financial losses, and the increasing size of the festival made it harder for the hosting states to organise the festival every year, so from 1992 to the present the festival has been held in Canberra at Exhibition Park in Canberra (EPIC).

The 2020 festival was not held due to restrictions caused by the COVID-19 pandemic in Australia. In 2021 a scaled-down 2 day version titled "Good Folk" was held over the border in Queanbeyan over 3-4 April. The event was profitable and praised by artists and patrons. The festival returned to its normal time and location in April 2022.

== Features ==
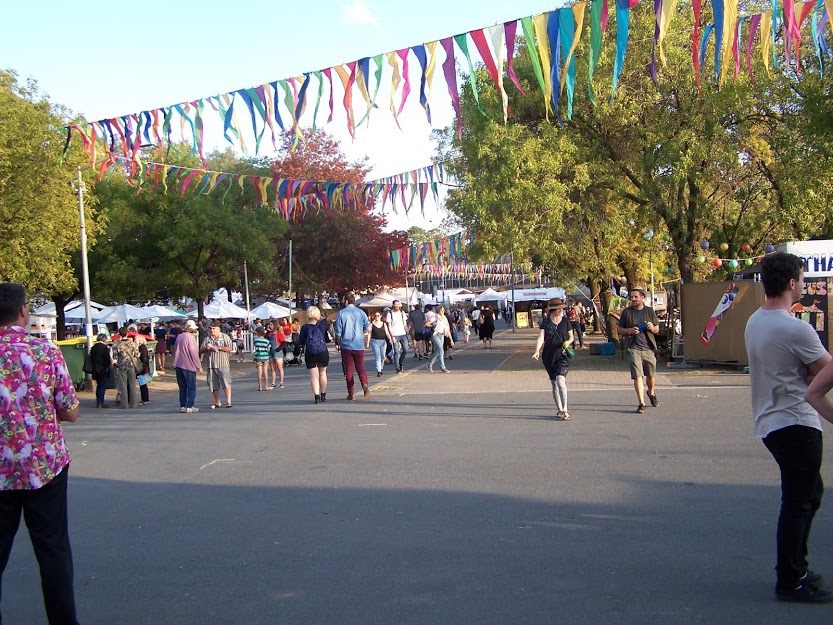
A section of the National Folk Festival in 2019

The festival usually takes place at Exhibition Park in Canberra, which for the duration resembles a small and colourful village with music and dance venues, cafes, themed bars and stalls, as well as a community arts area for demonstrating and workshopping a range of arts disciplines, as well as the tradition bearers demonstration area where visitors can view the making of a range of Australian craft and purchase gifts. There is a traditional bush camp that resembles a bush scenario with performances and bush-style damper and stew and billy tea. Camping is provided adjacent to the festival grounds for around 5,000 people. In 2011, the event was attended by approximately 50,000 people. Approximately 800 to 1100 volunteers make the festival possible.

The festival has over 140 concerts, a number of impromptu street performances, workshops on making, playing and repairing musical instruments, visual art, storytelling and poetry, and dance workshops. There are at least 60 craft stalls, over food vendors and 5 bars with dedicated restaurant areas.

For the five days of the festival, there is also an almost continuous pub session at the "Session Bar", known as the "London Underground" of folk music, that only stops briefly due to alcohol licence restrictions in the early morning and bigins again in mid-morning for another round the clock session of music and culture.

International and Australian performers are featured, with the organisers committed to representing the full spectrum of folk, ethnic and Indigenous music.

The festival has an opening and closing concert in the 3,000 seat Budawang Pavilion. Each night has a dance, starting with a Scottish ball on Friday night, an Irish ceili on Saturday night and an Australian Colonial ball on Sunday night. Other dance styles including Latin, tango, flamenco and contra dance are also included at the festival.

The National Folk Festival features several large permanent indoor venues.
