= Margot Robinne =

French footballer (born 1991)

Margot Robinne (French: [maʁɡo ʁɔbin]; born 26 April 1991) is a French footballer who plays as a midfielder, winger or striker for Boroondara-Carey Eagles.

== Early life ==
Robinne made her senior football debut at the age of fifteen.

== Education ==
Robinne attended the University of Rouen Normandy in France.

== Playing career ==
Robinne is the first French female player to play in the Australian top flight. In 2021, Robinne signed for Australian side Melbourne City, where she was described as "forged a reputation as a dangerous, impactful substitute".

== Style of play ==
Robinne operated as a defensive midfielder, attacking midfielder, and winger while playing for Canberra United. She has been described as "known as an intelligent striker with an excellent technical skillset".

== Managerial career ==
Robinne worked as a technical director of an Australian club and founded a youth academy in Australia with a friend.

== Personal life ==
Robinne has brothers. She obtained Australian permanent residency.
