= Henry Curran =

Henry Curran may refer to:

- Henry Curran (Australian politician) (1912–1975), member of the Legislative Assembly of Western Australia
- Henry M. Curran (1918–1993), American politician from New York
- Henry H. Curran (Republican), 10th director of Ellis Island, from 1923 to 1926
- Henry Joseph Curran (1843–1882), Australian journalist
- Henry 'Babe' Curran (1896–1964), Australian woolgrower
- Harry Curran (born 1966), Scottish footballer
