= COVID-19 protests in Australia =

Protests against COVID-19 restrictions in Australia

COVID-19 lockdown protests in Australia
- Part of protests over responses to the COVID-19 pandemic
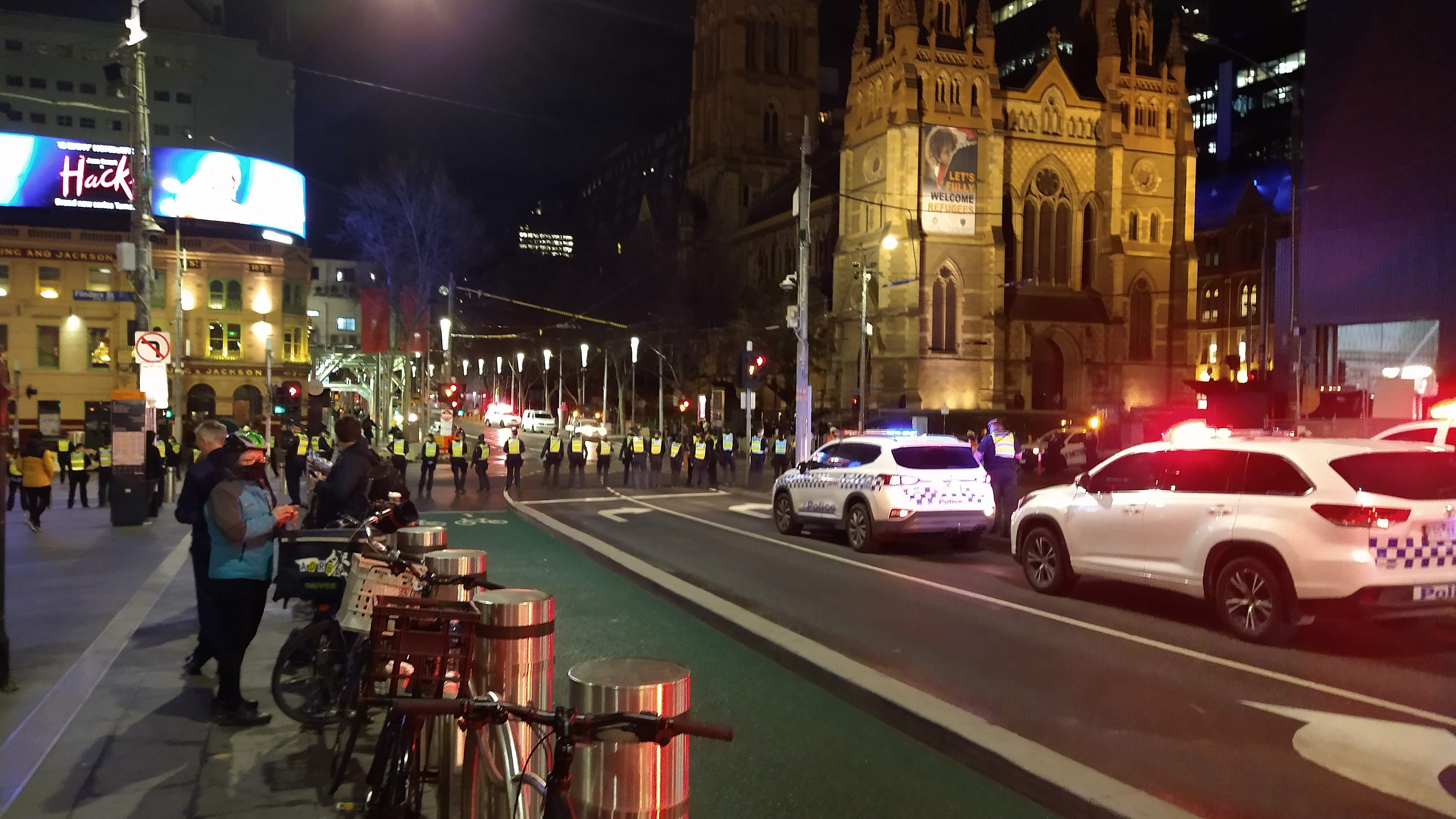
- Police presence in Melbourne following a protest, upon the announcement of the sixth lockdown of the city.
- Date: 25 April 2020 – 14 October 2022 (2 years, 5 months and 19 days)
- Location: Australia
- Caused by: COVID-19 lockdowns; COVID-19 restrictions
- Status: Ended protests: All mandatory quarantine rules lifted due to COVID-19, including all five states on 14 October 2022

Parties
Protesters; Supported by: Several right-wing and far-right politicians	Police; Pro-Vax Counterprotesters; Supported by: (Australia) Federal and state governments

Lead figures
List: (Australia) Clive Palmer; (Australia) Craig Kelly; (Australia) George Christensen; (Australia) Malcolm Roberts; (Australia) Pauline Hanson; (Australia) Ralph Babet	List: (Australia) Scott Morrison; (Australia) Anthony Albanese; (New South Wales) Gladys Berejiklian; (New South Wales) Dominic Perrottet; (Victoria (state)) Daniel Andrews; (Queensland) Annastacia Palaszczuk; (Western Australia) Mark McGowan; (South Australia) Steven Marshall; (South Australia) Peter Malinauskas; (Tasmania) Peter Gutwein; (Tasmania) Jeremy Rockliff; (Australian Capital Territory) Andrew Barr; (Northern Territory) Michael Gunner; (Northern Territory) Natasha Fyles

Protests over responses to the COVID-19 pandemic have occurred around the world. There have been several protests against lockdowns and other restrictions introduced by the Commonwealth and state governments in response to the COVID-19 pandemic in Australia since 2020. Some joining protests have also been against vaccinations, while others have also subscribed to various conspiracy theories or misinformation about COVID-19. Protests have been held in several state capitals, with most occurring in including Sydney and Melbourne. While some protests were peaceful, others ended in clashes between protesters and police. Australian police have issued fines against protesters for breaching lockdown restrictions.

== Protests ==
=== National ===
==== 2020 ====
On 2 September 2020, a 28-year-old woman was arrested and charged with allegedly organising an anti-lockdown protest on social media. Victoria Police Assistant Commissioner Luke Cornelius said he was outraged that there were people in the community who thought it was a good idea to leave home and mass protest during a time of a deadly pandemic. Charges against the woman were dropped by police in mid 2022, a statement by police stated it was 'not in the public interest' to continue the prosecution.

On 5 September 2020, anti-lockdown protesters held a "Freedom Day" protest in Melbourne and across Australia. Hundreds of protesters gathered at the Shrine of Remembrance in Melbourne and walked to Albert Park Lake. A police statement said that Victoria Police officers arrested 17 people, including one person who was arrested for assaulting a police officer, and 160 fines were issued for breach of directions.

On 12 and 13 September 2020, anti-lockdown protesters held further "Freedom Marches" on Saturday and Sunday at Queen Victoria Market in Melbourne. On Sunday, the protesters were met with a heavy police presence, including riot police and mounted police. Scuffles broke out as arrests were made and a police officer was filmed placing their knee near the neck of one demonstrator as other officers handcuffed him. On Saturday, Victoria Police arrested 14 people and issued 50 fines and on Sunday, 74 people were arrested and 176 fined. Videos and images show Victoria Police surrounding/encircling protesters near Queen Victoria Market and chasing protesters.

On 19 September 2020, approximately 100 anti-lockdown protesters held a protest at the State Library in Melbourne and then later moved to a park in Elwood. The protesters marched along the road and were dispersed by mounted police. 16 protesters were arrested for breaching directions.

==== 2021 ====
On 20 February 2021, anti-COVID-19 vaccine rallies were held in Adelaide, Brisbane, Melbourne, Perth and Sydney. There were a few hundred people at each. These protests coincided with the Australian Federal Government's COVID-19 vaccination program, which was scheduled to start on 22 February.

On 24 July 2021, there were further anti-lockdown protests in several Australian state capital cities. These included Melbourne; Sydney; where several people were arrested, including Brady Gunn, founder of A Stand in the Park freedom movement. Ninety infringement notices issued and 57 people charged; and Brisbane, where no arrests were made and no fines handed out for not wearing a mask. During the Sydney protest, a protester drew media attention after images appeared to show him punching a New South Wales Police horse named "Tobruk". However, a new video surfaced later showing he did not actually punch the horse, but was defending himself. All charges were dropped in 2023.

On 21 August 2021 there were more anti-lockdown protests in most state capitals. Up to 4,000 marched in Melbourne with over 200 arrested, and smaller protests were held in Adelaide, Brisbane, Darwin, Perth and Sydney. In Sydney the protest met a police response of over 1,500 officers and roadblocks on major roads into the central business district. About 250 people got into the city, with over 45 people being arrested. One of its main organisers, a 29-year-old Victorian man, was jailed in NSW for up to 8 months on 20 August for breaching public health orders by travelling to Sydney from Queensland. Victoria Police arrested 218 people and issued more than 200 fines, each amounting to more than A$5,400 (US$3,850). In New South Wales Police arrested 47 people and fined more than 260 in response to state-wide demonstrations. More than 2000 people staged a largely peaceful protest in Brisbane.

On 29 August 2021, truck drivers attempted to blockade major highways with their trucks across the country. Some protests were more successful than others.

=== Victoria ===
==== 2020 ====
On Anzac Day (25 April 2020), anti-lockdown protests occurred in the rural town of Trafalgar, Victoria.

On Mother's Day (9 May 2020) around 100 to 300 protesters picketed against the lockdown and vaccinations outside Victoria's Parliament House in Melbourne. Protesters, some of whom also subscribed to 5G conspiracy theories, protested against vaccinations, lockdown restrictions and the "coronavirus conspiracy", defying social-distancing restrictions, and violent scenes ensued.

On 28 August 2020 there was a protest at a reserve in Dandenong. One man, the organiser, was arrested and charged with breaching bail conditions. 19 others were fined.

On 5 September 2020, about 300 anti-lockdown protesters marched from Melbourne's Shrine of Remembrance to Albert Park and Lake. Several protesters were arrested.

On 3 November 2020 in Melbourne, more than 400 people were arrested and nearly 400 penalties issued at a protest.

==== 2021 ====
On 12 February 2021, there was another anti-lockdown protest in Melbourne, where two were arrested.

During the 2021 Australian Open in February at Melbourne Park, an official referred to the COVID-19 vaccine as a sign of optimism, which was followed by booing by the fans present at the event. The Australian Government criticised the reaction of the fans.

On 28 May 2021, there was another protest in Melbourne during their fourth lockdown.

On 5 August 2021, there was another anti-lockdown protest at about 7pm in Flinders Street, Melbourne in which up to 400 people took part. Victoria's sixth lockdown began at 8pm that day, making it largely illegal. At least 16 fines for breaches of health directions and 15 arrests were made.

On 18 August 2021, 21 police officers were injured in a violent anti-lockdown protest in Melbourne. Officers arrested more than 200 people and issued more than $1 million in fines to people who attended the demonstration. Chief Commissioner Shane Patton said he had received intelligence that right-wing extremists were involved in the protest, which involved around 4,000 people.

On 18 September 2021, between 8.00 am and 2.00 pm, by the request of Victoria Police, public transport services into and out of the Melbourne CBD were suspended and roads closed, in response to a planned anti-lockdown protest and concerns about violence.

On 20 September 2021, there was a protest by hundreds of people against mandatory vaccination for construction workers outside the Construction, Forestry, Maritime, Mining and Energy Union (CFMEU) headquarters in Melbourne. To be allowed to work, tradespeople were required to have had at least one dose of vaccine by 23 September. The protest became violent, the union building was damaged, and riot police employed pepper spray and rubber bullets. Combined with an increase in transmission of COVID-19 in the industry, from 11.59pm that night all building and construction industry worksites in Ballarat, Geelong, Metropolitan Melbourne, Mitchell Shire and the Surf Coast were shut down for two weeks.

On 21 September 2021 in Melbourne, there was another protest with thousands of people marching against a wide range of pandemic response related issues, including the previous days' construction industry shut down. The "Victorian Workers Rally For Freedom" started near to the CFMEU headquarters at 10am, went through the CBD, past state Parliament, Flinders Street railway station, then onto and blocking the busy West Gate Freeway causing "chaos" in peak hour traffic. At least one media reporter was assaulted, and objects, including bottles and flares, were thrown at police. Riot police again used tear gas and rubber bullets and at least 62 arrests were made. Union officials such as John Setka, CFMEU Victorian state secretary, and Sally McManus, Australian Council of Trade Unions (ACTU) national secretary, asserted that the protests had been hijacked, McManus saying it was by "... far right groups and anti-vax groups, ...". The construction shutdown has put about 300,000 out of work, and could cost the industry nearly AU$500 million per day.

On 22 September 2021, in Melbourne city, a protest occurred with up to 1,000 people converging on the Shrine of Remembrance. After a stand-off for a few hours with police surrounding them, protesters were dispersed at about 5pm. Two police officers were injured by thrown bottles and more than 200 people were arrested. An estimated 300 fines were issued for not complying with stay-at-home directives. One protester there was hospitalised by the next day with COVID-19.

On 23 September 2021, there was a strong police presence in Melbourne at State Parliament, CFMEU offices, and the Shrine. Protesters statements and related electronic messaging indicated more protests were possible. 92 arrests were made as police checked that people were lawfully in the CBD and in compliance with the state Chief Health Officers' current directives. Some arrests were for outstanding warrants. The protests resulted in the closure, for at least four days, of a vaccination centre at Melbourne Town Hall, and also a drop-in clinic for the homeless near Queen Victoria Market. Staff at the vaccination clinic were verbally and physically abused in public places on their way to work. Protests and strong police response to protests continued on the weekend of 24 and 25 September, with around 300 arrests made in Melbourne and St Kilda.

On 27 September 2021, an estimated 50 frontline health care workers rallied in Melbourne Park to protest against state premier Daniel Andrews' decision to make vaccination mandatory within the health care sector. The protesters were seen taking precautions to keep the possible spread of COVID-19 to a minimum, such as social distancing and wearing face shields or face masks. One or more were seen with an "X" marked with duct tape over their masks, to symbolise that they were being silenced. One of the nurses stated that they were not "anti-vax" but "pro-choice" and that they did not believe that mandatory vaccination was a morally correct way to boost vaccination numbers. Many nurses were seen with picket signs, usually with a message in relation to mandatory vaccination, such as: "No jab – No job?", "My body – My choice" and "coercion is not consent". Approximately 30 minutes after the protesters arrived, 200 Victoria Police officers arrived and instructed the workers to "move on" or they may have faced fines or been arrested for breaching public health orders. Many criticised the decision made by Victoria Police, one man who was at the park with his children stated; "It is a bit nerve-wracking being in the playground with your kids and seeing 200 cops". The group of protesters dispersed peacefully after being instructed by police to do so.

Protests resumed on 2 October, with mandatory vaccinations for authorised workers added to the list of grievances.

On 16 October, anti-lockdown and anti-vaccination protests occurred across Melbourne, but were broadly unsuccessful due to the efforts of Victorian Police in intercepting protester communications and stopping protests before they could gain momentum.

Various protests against Daniel Andrews' proposed COVID-19 pandemic legislation continued outside Parliament House and around Melbourne's CBD throughout November, with attendance on 20 November estimated to have ranged from tens of thousands to 100,000.

On 16 November, anti-lockdown and anti-vaccination protests occurred outside of the Victorian parliament, They had a makeshift Gallows of an effigy of Dan Andrews. This was condemned by many political leaders.

In 2023, Victoria Police ended their internal investigations into the actions of police against protesters, including the use of pepper spray and conducting illicit arrests. According to the Police, no disciplinary action will be taken against officers as the organization claimed that the officer was cleared of misconduct.

==== 2022 ====
On 2 January, a man in Richmond in Melbourne set himself ablaze to protest vaccine mandates. Police and paramedics attended to the man, who sustained life-threatening injuries.

On 14 October 2022, Australia lifted all mandatory isolation rules due to COVID-19 including all five states.

=== New South Wales ===
On 3 January 2021, an anti-mask protest was held inside Westfield Bondi Junction in New South Wales. This was the first day that new mask wearing requirements, including venues like shopping centres, came into effect.

On 23 January 2021 an anti-mask protest was stopped by New South Wales Police from entering the Westfield Parramatta shopping centre. Warning was given to the group to obey public health orders, and follow social distancing guidelines. One man was arrested. A protest group had been turned away from the Parramatta Westfield a week earlier.

On 17 July 2021, there was a protest in the afternoon at Paul Keating Park in Bankstown against the added stay-at-home lockdown rules mandated that day for Canterbury-Bankstown, Fairfield, and Liverpool local government areas in Sydney's south-west. Two people were arrested and charged. A second illegal anti-lockdown protest was held in Sydney on 24 July 2021, from which at least 57 people were charged with a criminal offence.

In August 2021, Anthony Khallouf, a key anti-lockdown protest organiser was arrested and found guilty for multiple breaches of public health orders as well as planning an unauthorised protest in Sydney, and had been sentenced a maximum of eight months in prison that included a non-parole period of three months.

On 22 August there was a protest against COVID restrictions by about 1,000 people on the NSW/Qld border at Tweed Heads. Eight people were arrested and over 50 infringement notices issued.

On 31 August 2021, police arrested 135 people and issued 436 citations in connection with coordinated anti-lockdown protests across New South Wales. Several police officers were injured. There were 79 protests across the state including outside the NSW Parliament building and the Byron Shire Council Chambers in Mullumbimby. Also in Ballina, Cessnock, Grafton, Lake Macquarie, Lismore, Mudgee, Nowra, Orange, Port Macquarie and Wagga Wagga. 24 of the protests were in the state's north.

=== Queensland ===
On 30 May 2020, after more than a month of protesting in Brisbane, Arjay Martin held an authorised public assembly in Brisbane, starting in King George Square and marching on the Queensland Parliament. There were various groups in attendance, totalling 1,800–2,500 attendees. There were other smaller protests in state capitals.

On 30 August 2021 in the morning there was a protest, against COVID-19 lockdowns and vaccination requirements, by truck drivers and supporters at Reedy Creek on the Gold Coast's M1 highway. During peak hour the protesters blocked the exit to Reedy Creek. Their supporters included Senator Pauline Hanson. They later moved to Chinderah in NSW to continue their protest.

On 23 January 2022, there was an unauthorised protest march in Mackay. Some protesters split from the main group and went through the Caneland Central shopping centre. Three men were arrested with charges including, serious assault of a police officer, obstructing police, public nuisance and failing to comply with a COVID-19 public health direction. The protest was about Queensland's vaccine mandates, and the introduction of voluntary COVID-19 vaccines for children.

=== Western Australia ===
Led by several failed political candidates, a protest against mandatory vaccinations proceeded from Forrest Place to Elizabeth Quay on 16 October 2021, with a second protest rally held in Forrest Place on 22 January 2022.

Across early 2022 a coordinated campaign was run by the “Pro Choice Team” led by Dianne Cudby to petition local councils to force Special Elector's Meetings. The majority of local governments rejected the calls outright, including City of Rockingham, City of Mandurah, and Town of Victoria Park. However several local governments had Councillors put motions calling on their local councils to oppose vaccination requirements and lobby the state government on the issue, including Councillor Vujcic from the City of Fremantle, who claimed vaccinations were no longer required for omicron strains, and Councillor Anne Ryan from the City of Busselton who moved a motion denying there was even any evidence of a pandemic. Shire of Bridgetown-Greenbushes President John Bookless was also strongly criticised for his anti-vaccination stance and subsequently resigned after less than six month in the role.

=== Australian Capital Territory ===
Between 31 January 2022 and 13 February 2022, thousands of protesters participated in the Convoy to Canberra protest, which was inspired by the Canadian Freedom Convoy protest. Protesters converged on the Australian capital Canberra, camping near the Australian Parliament, National Library and the National Press Club. As with the Canadian protest, the Canberra protest was organised through various social media and crowdfunding platforms including Facebook, Telegram, GoFundMe, and GiveSendGo. This protest attracted anti-vaccination activists, anti-vaccine mandate activists, the Sovereign citizen movement, ultra religious groups, members of the United Australia Party, and self-proclaimed indigenous rights activists. By 13 February, most of the Convoy protesters had dispersed after local authorities moved them in preparation for the Royal Canberra Show.

== Support ==
=== Groups ===
Individuals from various groups subscribing to extremist ideologies, such as the National Socialist Network (NSN), known for their neo-Nazi beliefs, and the Proud Boys have been attending the anti-lockdown protests to recruit new members. Other individuals and groups have also attempted to stir up anti-semitic sentiment at the protests, such as "Dominic D", an alias for a 24-year-old Melbourne man Harrison Mclean, who describes himself as a "Libertarian Populist", and who has links to far-right Proud Boys and attempts to introduce people at the rallies to conspiracy theories such as the New World Order.

The July protests in Sydney were publicised by both Australian and international groups on the Telegram messaging app. A German group called Worldwide Demonstration, operated out of the city of Kassel by individuals self-described as "Freie Bürger Kassel" (Free Citizens of Kassel). The group coordinated a series of 129 events around the world in March. Other groups involved in the protests in Australia include Australians vs The Agenda, Reignite, Australian Vaccination-risks Network, and Informed Medical Options. While some of the groups are associated with conspiracy theories and the far right, there are also a number of individuals drawn to the protests because of a general distrust of authority.

According to Victoria Police Chief Commissioner Shane Patton, several far-right extremists took part in the anti-lockdown protest in Melbourne on 21 August 2021, which ended with more than 218 arrests.

=== Support from political parties ===
Party	Stance	Notes and references
Liberal Democrats	Support	
Coalition	Mixed	Victorian Liberal Party were in support for some of the protests while the federal and other branches of the party either oppose the protest or have an ambiguous position. In addition, various State and Federal Coalition MP's endorse the position of the anti-vax movement and attended their rallies. However, the Coalition condemned the violence.
Palmer United	Support	
Greens	Oppose	
Labor	Oppose	
One Nation	Support	
Reason	Oppose	
Animal Justice	Oppose	
