= Ginninderra Blacksmith's Shop =

The Ginninderra blacksmith's shop is one of the most significant historical sites of the Australian Capital Territory. It was one of the first sites to be listed on the ACT Interim Heritage Places Register in 1993. The workshop is also of national importance as it is one of only a few known surviving stand-alone blacksmith shops in Australia; although, many farm-based smithies have survived. The building remains in stable condition, but there is no firm plan concerning its long-term management and it remains fenced-off and inaccessible to the public.

It has survived fire, vandalism and neglect for over 160 years. It is located on the Barton Highway, next to Deasland homestead, which is slated for demolition due to the ‘Mr Fluffy’ loose-fill asbestos disaster.

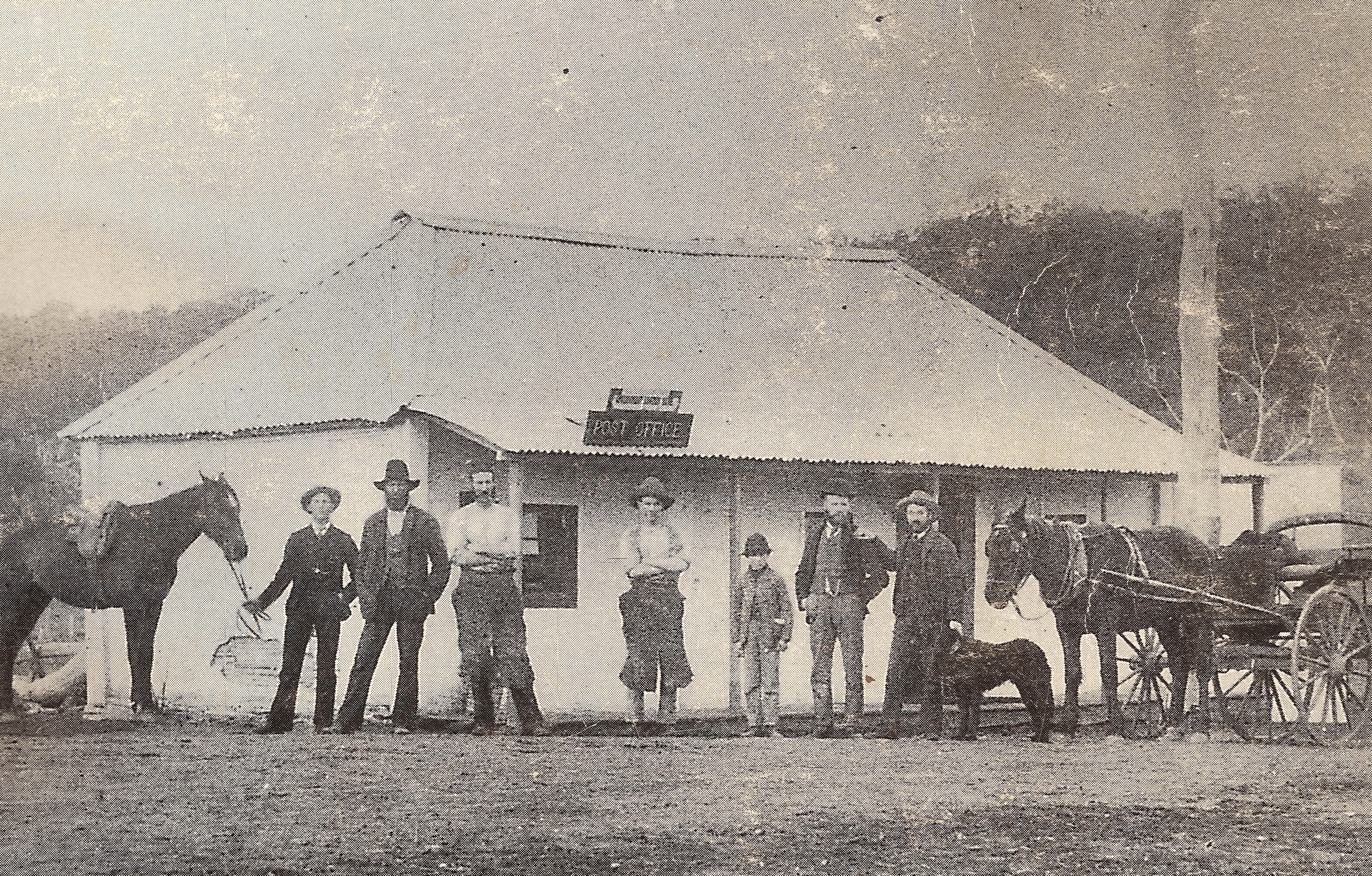
Locals gathered outside the Ginninderra Post Office, c. 1882, including the Ginninderra blacksmith, George Curran, and his nephew and apprentice, Harry Curran (third and fourth from the left)

The workshop has an earthen floor and is constructed of timber posts, slabs and corrugated iron. It contains the remnants of a forge with a small cast-iron door and a petrol engine next to restored leather bellows.

== The five blacksmiths of Ginninderra ==
The last full-time professional blacksmith of the ACT was Henry (‘Harry’) Curran. In 1949, after 67 years as the Ginninderra blacksmith, he retired. At that time, he was 82 and the oldest professional blacksmith in Australia. At least four smiths had run the Ginninderra blacksmith's shop before him from 1859 until 1891. All five Ginninderra blacksmiths were related to each other.

1. 1859–1865: James Hatch (married Mary Ann Daley); no known apprentices
2. 1865–1876: Flourence McAuliffe (married Mary Ann Flanagan); five apprentices: John Wilson, Bobby Hamilton, John and Charles Fowler, George Curran
3. 1876–1889: George Curran (married Mary Ann Hatch); two apprentices: Harry Curran and Michael Hickey
4. 1889–1891: Alexander Warwick (married Esther Wall); junior partner: Augustus Helmund
5. 1891–1949: Henry (‘Harry’) Curran (married Agnes Gribble); junior partner: George Gribble

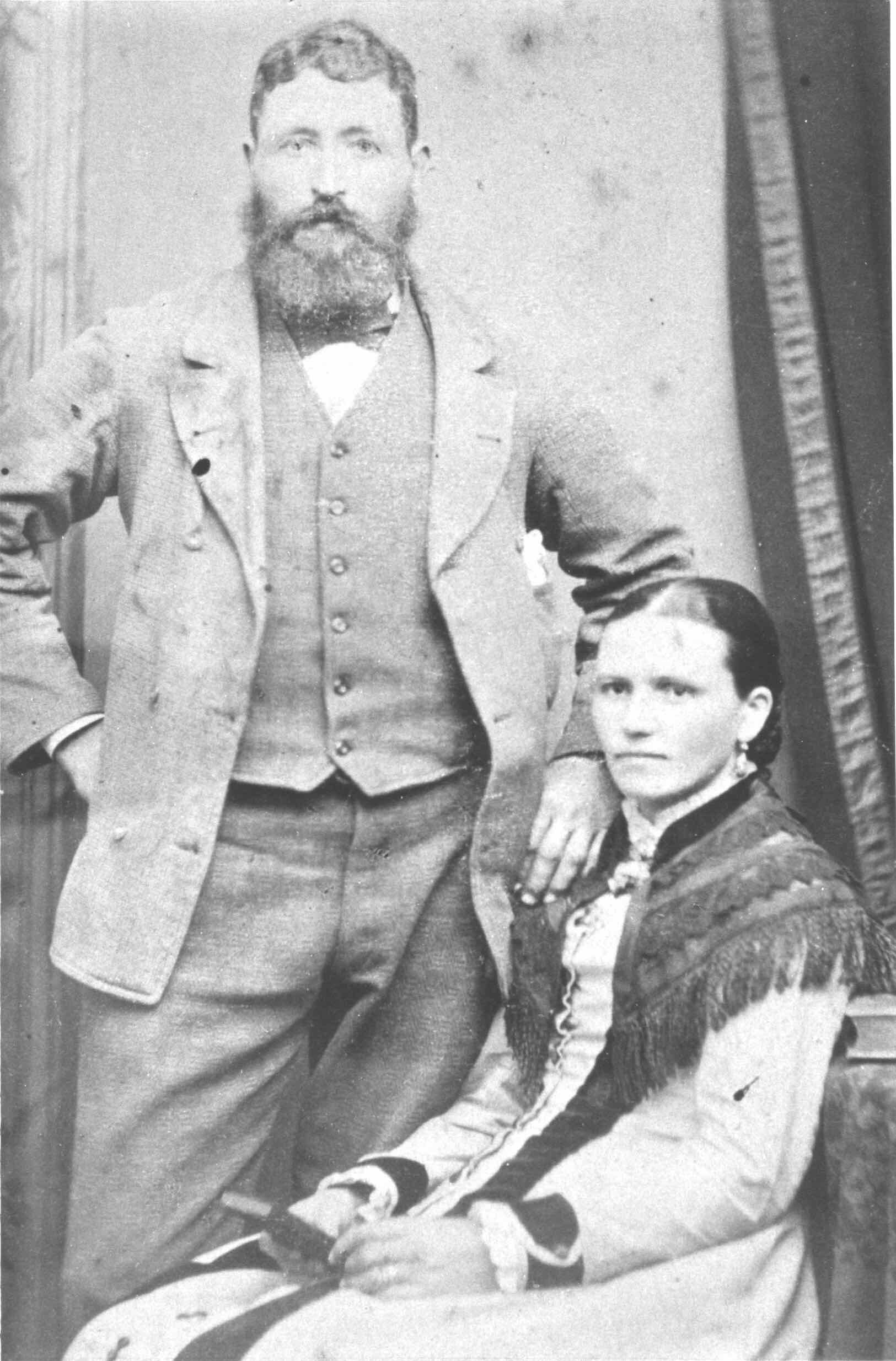
First blacksmith of Ginninderra, James Hatch and his wife, Mary Ann Daley, c. 1865

James Hatch built the original blacksmith's shop, possibly as early as 1859, but more likely in 1860 as he seems to have been away at the Kiandra goldfield in 1859. Upon his return to Ginninderra, he spent his time between farming and blacksmithing. Hatch's elder brother, William, also moved to the district, taking up a selection called Rosewood in 1862. But James Hatch soon left Ginninderra for Urana in southern NSW by 1867.

Flourence McAuliffe took over from Hatch in c. 1865. In 1867, fire destroyed his residence nearby. Fortunately, the blacksmith's shop was saved with the help of Aboriginal man, Bobby Hamilton, and other Ginninderra neighbours. McAuliffe was one of the key advocates for a district school and supported the free selectors in Ginninderra. He led the formation of the Ginninderra Protection Union. McAuliffe's workshop failed. In 1877 he was declared bankrupt.

The third Ginninderra smith was George Curran. Curran married Mary Ann Hatch, the niece of the original smith. George's younger brother, John Curran, became the blacksmith at Murrumbateman, which meant that the brothers dominated the blacksmithing trade between Murrumbateman and Ginninderra in the 1876-89 period. The Queanbeyan Age said ‘You can hear the notes, loud and clear, with all their variations, from the anvil of Mr George Curran’s blacksmith’s forge’. Curran hired two formal apprentices. One was his nephew, Harry Curran, whose father was Henry Joseph Curran, a prominent journalist with the Catholic papers in Goulburn, Boorowa and Sydney. In 1882 when fourteen-year-old Harry was orphaned, his uncles, Patrick Curran and Thomas Lodge, adopted his siblings, but Harry was sent to Ginninderra as an apprentice under George.

When the Currans left Ginninderra to set up shop in Bungendore in 1889, another short-term smith arrived at Ginninderra. This was Alexander Warwick. Through his wife, he was related to the Hatch and Curran families. Helping him in the blacksmithing business was Augustus Helmund, the son of a German sign writer from Queanbeyan. Warwick had come from Braidwood, where his father had combined blacksmithing and work as a teamster before buying the Canberra blacksmith's shop, (near St John's, Reid) which doubled up as the local post office. It seemed like a good business move for the son to take over at Ginninderra and, between them, the Warwicks hoped to dominate the district's business north of the Molonglo River. But Warwick's span as the Ginninderra smith ended in March 1891. Like McAuliffe, he was also declared bankrupt. No handover had been arranged, which meant that the smithy was vacant. Harry Curran seized the opportunity, left his uncle George at Bungendore, and took over the workshop at Ginninderra a few months later in his own right.

Curran married local, Agnes Gribble. He ran the workshop in partnership with her brother, the talented sportsman, George Gribble. But Curran's return as blacksmith in 1891 was not without incident. Ginninderra was in decline and a rival smithy opened up in nearby Hall village in the 1890s. In 1893, Curran found himself indirectly involved in a criminal case brought against his brother-in-law, who was charged with stealing seed corn from John Southwell, and hiding it in the blacksmith's shop. Gribble was acquitted. Matters improved and, by the late 1890s, the Currans had built a weatherboard home about 100m east of the workshop.

== The last years of its operation ==
In 1905, the smithy and other buildings in Ginninderra village were threatened by a major bushfire, which swept across from Wallaroo. The newspapers, at the time, reported that it had been a close thing. The blacksmith's shop remained the focus for what was left of Ginninderra village in the twentieth century. The Ginninderra smithy was even used as a polling booth in the 1907 election.

In 1923, artist, Eirene Mort, when compiling a collection of works on the Canberra district, visited the workshop and made a pencil sketch of Curran at work at his anvil. Her drawing is now part of the collection of the National Library of Australia and is on loan to the Canberra Museum and Gallery’s permanent display, which also features Curran’s smaller anvil and swage block. In February 1954, when Elizabeth II visited Canberra, Curran was one of seven elderly ‘pioneers’ invited to meet the royal party. Lionel Wigmore recorded that, when he was introduced to Philip, Duke of Edinburgh, who remarked, ‘you must have worked very hard’, Harry Curran's dry reply was, ‘Too right I did!’. Just two years later, Curran, the last professional blacksmith of the ACT, died. His blacksmith journal is part of the collection of the Hall School Museum and Heritage Centre. The blacksmith's shop is fenced off on the Barton Highway. Access is managed through the ACT Government.
