= Convoy to Canberra =

Anti-vaccine mandate protest

- Part of COVID-19 protests in Australia
- Date: 31 January 2022 – 13 February 2022
- Location: Canberra, Australian Capital Territory
- Caused by: COVID-19 pandemic in Australia, opposition to federal and state COVID-19 mitigation and vaccination policies
- Methods: Convoy
- Status: Ended

Parties
Convoy to Canberra; Sovereign citizen movement; Ultra-religious groups; United Australia Party; One Nation; Rebel News; Coalition (factions)	Government of Australia: (Australian Capital Territory) National Capital Authority; ACT Police; Australian Federal Police; Supported by: Australian Greens; Australian Labor Party; Coalition (majority); State premiers

Lead figures
Clive Palmer; Craig Kelly; George Christensen; Gerard Rennick; Pauline Hanson	Andrew Barr; Scott Morrison

Number
c.10,000	

Arrests and charges
- Arrested: 4
- Charged: 1

The convoy to Canberra was an anti-vaccine mandate protest in Australia between late January and mid-February 2022 that was inspired by the Canadian Freedom Convoy protest in Ottawa. Thousands of protesters converged on the Australian capital city of Canberra, camping near the Australian Parliament, National Library and the National Press Club. As with the Canadian protest, the Canberra protest was organised through various social media platforms including Facebook, Telegram, GoFundMe, and GiveSendGo. By 13 February, most of the convoy protesters had dispersed after local authorities moved them in preparation for the Royal Canberra Show.

== Background ==
The Canadian anti-lockdown and anti-vaccine mandate Freedom Convoy which began in Ottawa in late January 2022 inspired similar Facebook and Telegram groups in 34 countries including Australia. The Convoy to Canberra attracted various elements including anti-vaccination activists, anti-vaccine mandate activists, the Sovereign citizen movement, extreme religious groups, members of the United Australia Party, and others who purported to advocate for indigenous rights. The Aboriginal Tent Embassy disavowed the protestors who purported to speak on behalf of indigenous people as part of the Convoy to Canberra, and criticised Sovereign citizen activists for hijacking Indigenous Australian activism.

== Timeline ==
From 31 January 2022, a "Convoy to Canberra" consisting of thousands of protesters in trailers, trucks, cars and campervans gathered in Canberra, picketing the National Library of Australia, the Australian Parliament House and the National Press Club. Convoy participants vowed to remain to protest COVID-19 restrictions until the Australian Parliament sat on 8 February 2022. Protest organisers also planned an "Occupy Canberra" protest at Old Parliament House and the Australian Parliament House to coincide with the resumption of Parliament in the week of 7 February.

Protesters waved flags or wore merchandise supporting Donald Trump, the United Australia Party, One Nation, the QAnon conspiracy theory, and anti-lockdown groups. In addition protesters criticised several prominent federal and state figures including Prime Minister Scott Morrison, Victorian Premier Daniel Andrews, New South Wales Premier Dominic Perrottet, and Australian Labor Party leader Anthony Albanese. The far right Canadian media outlet Rebel News's correspondent Avi Yemini also covered the protests; with the outlet's videos being circulated on several social media platforms including Facebook, YouTube, Twitter, Telegram and Instagram.

The presence of protesters created traffic chaos in Canberra. On 2 February, police used pepper spray and arrested at least four participants while attempting to clear protesters camped outside the National Library. On 4 February, "Sovereign citizen" groups gathered outside police stations where supporters attempted to "serve papers" on public officials.

On 5 February, about 2,000 anti-vaccination mandate protestors marched to the Parliamentary Triangle. The march began at Glebe Park in the CBD, then onto Commonwealth Avenue, disrupting traffic. United Australia Party leader Craig Kelly, Liberal National Party of Queensland Member of Parliament George Christensen and Senator Gerard Rennick attended the protests. That same day, the National Capital Authority objected to illegal camping and parking outside the National Library and requested that Police remove them.

On 12 February, around 10,000 protesters converged on Parliament House and Old Parliament House. These protesters had camped at Exhibition Park in Canberra (EPIC), after being moved on from the lawns next to the National Library. Police arrested three people including one man for breaching a fence while two others were arrested for disturbing the peace. Participants called for the elimination of mandates and the sacking of government ministers. In response, Police called on protesters to vacate by 13 February. In response to protest activity, Lifeline Canberra and the Capital Regional Farmers Market suspended their events due to safety concerns for customers.

By 13 February, many of the Convoy to Canberra protesters had dispersed after being moved on from the EPIC camp ground ahead of preparations for the Royal Canberra Show. Some of them relocated to a private patch of farmland 45 minutes south of the Canberra CBD.

The presence of the protesters had created friction with Canberra locals over the past two weeks. The previous night, anti-mandate protesters attempted to enter a BentSpoke brewery in Canberra but were stopped by staff since they did not comply with health directions. One of the protesters even threw a glass at the bar. The protesters' actions were criticised by BentSpoke founder Richard Watkins, who defended the conduct of his staff.

== Responses ==
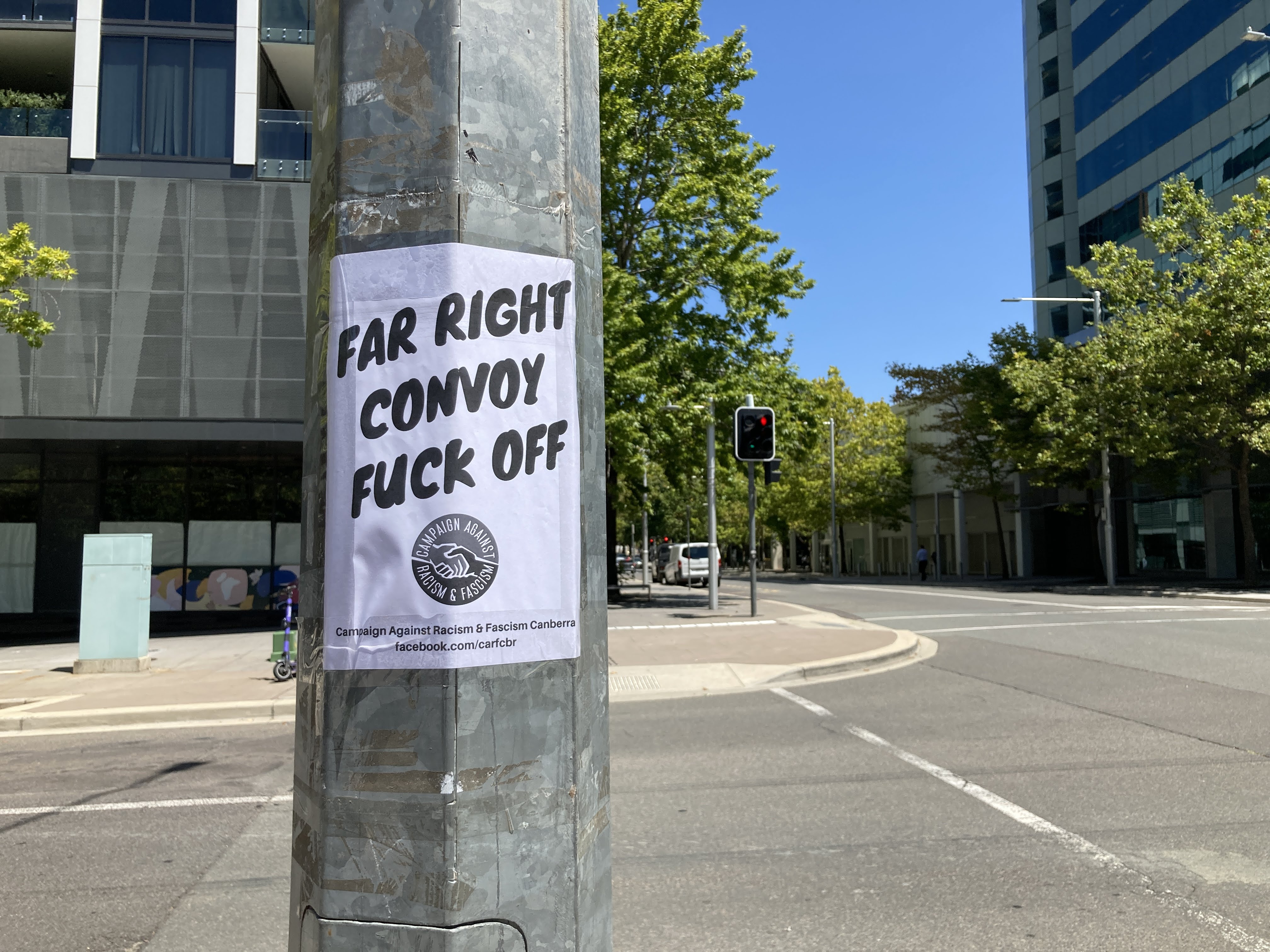
A poster in Canberra protesting against the Convoy to Canberra

=== Politicians ===
On 12 February 2022, Australian Prime Minister Scott Morrison defended his government's COVID-19 mitigation policies and urged protesters to demonstrate in a "peaceful and respectful way." Australian Labor Party leader Anthony Albanese called on them to return home and stated that their behaviour did little to advance their cause. By contrast, One Nation leader Pauline Hanson expressed support for the Canberra Convoy.

=== Social media ===
In late January 2022, the crowd fundraising website GoFundMe froze more than A$160,000 in funds raised by supporters of the "Convoy to Canberra" amidst concerns over how the money would be spent. On 8 February, the platform subsequently cancelled the pro-Convoy fundraising campaign on the grounds that it had violated its terms of service; returning more than A$179,000 to donors.

On 10 February, Crikey reported that several fake Facebook accounts based in India, Bangladesh and Canada were being used to organise the Convoy to Canberra protest and to solicit donations. One notable account purportedly belonged to a Canadian named James Rhodes was found to have an artificially generated image while the administrator of another group was revealed to be a Bangladeshi man named Shamim Khan. While Facebook and Telegram were being used to advertise the protest and coordinate attendees, crowdfunding platforms such as GoFundMe and GiveSendGo were being used to raise funds for the protests. Meta Platforms subsequently deleted a Convoy to Canberra Facebook group, which claimed 177,000 members. On 17 February, a follow-up Crikey report found that at least two Convoy to Canberra Facebook groups were linked to Bangladeshi Facebook users, who had been paid by organisers of the Australian and Canadian convoy protests to promote these Facebook groups and their content. Crikey also reported that 588 Australian-based donors had donated US$33,734 to the Canadian Freedom convoy via GiveSendGo.
