= Rochester racial slur video incident =

2025 video from Minnesota, United States

- Soldiers Field Memorial Park in Rochester, Minnesota
- Date: April–May 2025
- Location: Soldiers Field Memorial Park, Rochester, Minnesota, U.S.; 44.016650°N 92.465872°W
- Convicted: Shiloh Hendrix
- Charges: Disorderly conduct (2 counts) (Note: A third count was dismissed before trial.)
- Verdict: Not guilty on count 1 Guilty on count 2
- Sentence: 90 days in jail (suspended), $1,000 fine, and 200 hours of community service

In early May 2025, a confrontation between a white woman named Shiloh Hendrix and a black man named Sharmake Omar propagated online after she allegedly called an eight-year-old black child a racial slur at a public playground in Rochester, Minnesota after the child allegedly stole from her own child's diaper bag. Over the course of the recorded confrontation, the woman repeated the slur several times at the behest of the man recording.

Hendrix set up a fundraiser after she received threats and her address was doxxed. The fundraiser generated controversy as monetizing hate speech. Many of the donations were accompanied by comments expressing alt-right and racist sympathies, including references to Holocaust denial and white nationalism. A spokesperson for the Rochester Police Department stated that they had received calls related to the video and were "gathering information and actively looking into the matter".

On August 26, 2025, Hendrix was criminally charged with three misdemeanor counts of disorderly conduct in connection with the incident. One count was dropped in March 2026. In July 2026, Hendrix was found guilty on one count of disorderly conduct (and not guilty on the other) after a four-day trial. The count she was found guilty of was not the one related to the child, but rather the one related to the cameraman. She received a 90-day suspended jail sentence, a $1,000 fine, and 200 hours of community service. An appeal is pending as of July 2026.

== Incident ==
=== Video ===
During the week of April 28, 2025, a video was recorded at Soldiers Field Memorial Park in Rochester, Minnesota, by a 30-year-old man named Sharmake Omar. The video showed a white woman being confronted by Omar after allegedly calling an eight-year-old boy of Somali descent a "nigger". Omar did not know the boy but had met his parents. When Omar, who is also of Somali heritage, asked the woman if she had called the child the slur, she responded "Yeah," adding that the child had taken items belonging to her child from a diaper bag. Omar then confronted Hendrix, asking if he had heard her correctly. Hendrix answered yes, then directed the epithet at him several times, at which point Omar began filming her.

The video, which runs for 49 seconds, shows Hendrix walking away from Omar while carrying her son, with Omar following behind asking her to explain her actions. Hendrix responded, "mind your fucking own business" and accused the boy of stealing items from her son's diaper bag. When Omar asked if that would justify her use of the slur, Hendrix responded, "If that's what he's going to act like." The video then shows Hendrix giving Omar the middle finger, and sticking her tongue out at him. At one point, Omar asked Hendrix, "Why don't you have the balls to say it right now again so that the world can see?" Hendrix responded by repeating the slur three times in rapid succession, which Omar told her was "hate speech". "I don't give a shit," replied Hendrix, after which Omar said, "We'll see about that, what the Internet has to say about you."

In his interview with NBC, Omar said that Hendrix described the boy as a drain on the welfare system, and that the boy had been "visibly upset by the incident." In a different interview with KIMT-TV, Omar said he did not believe the woman's accusations of the child stealing from the diaper bag. According to the Rochester local newspaper, Post-Bulletin, Omar said the boy had taken a packet of applesauce off a park bench, which can be seen being held by Hendrix in the video.

=== Aftermath ===
Soon after the video went viral, Hendrix publicly declared herself to be the woman in the video and defended her actions by writing, "I called the kid out for what he was."

She set up a fundraiser on the crowdfunding website GiveSendGo in order to raise money to help her protect her family. She wrote that her family's address and her Social Security number and phone number had been leaked in the aftermath of the video, and that she had received online threats and fears she may need to relocate her family for safety reasons.

By May 6, the fundraiser had raised over US$700,000. Many of the donations were accompanied by comments expressing alt-right and racist sympathies, including references to Holocaust denial and white nationalism. Many donors wrote that they were defending free speech. In response, GiveSendGo muted comments on the fundraiser. Some conservatives said they saw the campaign for Hendrix as a "form of backlash" to the funds raised for Karmelo Anthony in the murder of Austin Metcalf, in which a black student had been charged with murdering a white student in Frisco, Texas, the month prior; the accused's fundraiser, also on GiveSendGo, raised more than half a million dollars. Some supporters of Make America Great Again also viewed it as a protest against anti-white racism and cancel culture.

The parents of the boy requested privacy, and said that they wanted Hendrix to be prosecuted if possible.

== Reactions ==
Omar stated in an interview with a local news outlet that he received death threats from social media users after Hendrix "called attention to" Omar's police record on her campaign page. The Minnesota branch of the Council on American-Islamic Relations called for the Federal Bureau of Investigation and local law enforcement to protect Omar and the family of the eight-year-old.

The Rochester chapter of the National Association for the Advancement of Colored People (NAACP) held a town hall meeting on May 7, condemning the actions of the woman in the video, and launched a GoFundMe fundraiser for the child in the video; they ended the campaign at the request of the family after the fundraiser surpassed its goal, raising US$341,504. Minnesota Attorney General Keith Ellison called the hate speech unacceptable while family members and civic leaders demanded that Hendrix be charged with a hate crime. The City of Rochester called the footage "deeply disturbing" in a social media post. The state legislature representatives for Rochester (Liz Boldon, Kim Hicks, Tina Liebling, and Andy Smith) released a joint statement commending Omar for "standing up and protecting one of our youngest community members" and condemning the actions of the woman in the video.

Media critic Parker Molloy called the fundraiser for Hendrix an example of "vice signaling", a form of virtue signaling for negative behaviors. Conservative political commentator Matt Walsh supported Hendrix's campaign and commented that, "The latest race-baiting story followed the cancel culture script right up until the twist ending" and that this was about "destroying the 'cancel culture' mob once and for all." Red Scare podcaster Anna Khachiyan said, "I will support [Hendrix] on principle because of the importance of not letting the left dictate speech codes and torment everyone with gay race communism."

== Legal proceedings ==
On May 2, a spokesperson for the Rochester Police Department said that they had received calls related to the video and were "gathering information and actively looking into the matter". On August 26, Hendrix was charged by summons with three misdemeanor counts of disorderly conduct, with each count carrying a maximum penalty of 90 days in jail and a $1,000 fine. On November 20, it was announced that a trial was set to begin on August 31, 2026, with a pretrial scheduled for August 21. On March 25, 2026, during her first in-person court appearance, one of the three misdemeanor counts of disorderly conduct was dropped.

On July 23, after a four day long trial, a jury found Hendrix guilty of the second count of disorderly conduct after 9 hours of deliberations. She was found not guilty on the first count. The count she was found guilty of was not the one related to the child, but rather the one related to the camera man. Judge Christa M. Daily fined Hendrix $1,000, sentenced her to a 90 day suspended jail sentence, and ordered her to perform 200 hours of community service. Court documents show that Hendrix's defense counsel, Brian Karalus, has filed an appeal in the Minnesota Court of Appeals.
