= Thomas Lodge (disambiguation) =

Thomas Lodge (c. 1558–1625) was an English dramatist.

Thomas Lodge may also refer to:

- Thomas Lodge (publican) (1830–1906), Australian publican
- Thomas Lodge (Lord Mayor of London) (died 1584)
- Thomas Lodge (civil servant) (1882–1958), British civil servant
- Thomas Lodge (priest), priest in Ireland
- Thomas Arthur Lodge (1888–1967), British architect
- Tom Lodge (1936–2012), English author and broadcaster

== See also ==
- Tommy Lodge (1921–2012), cricketer
- Thomas Skeffington-Lodge (1905–1994), British politician
