= Royal Canberra Show =

Annual agricultural show in Canberra

The Royal Canberra Show is an agricultural show that has been staged annually in Canberra since 1927 by the Royal National Capital Agricultural Society. The show has agriculture at its core, but it has expanded with the addition of rides, competitions and educational facilities. It is said that this is where "city meets country" and "country meets city".

== History ==
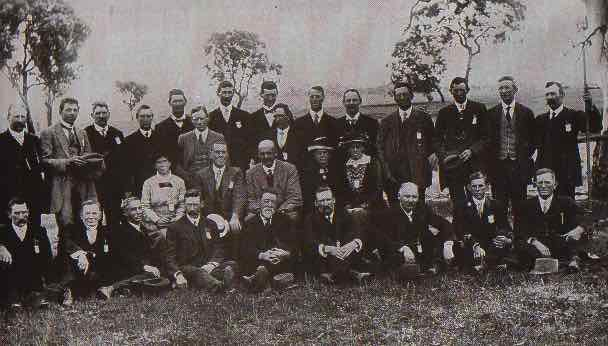
Ginninderra Farmers' Union Show Committee, 1915

The Royal Canberra Show can trace its origins back to the first events organised by the Ginninderra Farmers' Union, which was formed in 1905. At first, it ran sporting events at Ginninderra, including ploughing matches, but in 1909 it held its first annual agricultural show. These shows were discontinued because of the First World War, despite the 1915 event being attended by 1,200 people and raising much-needed funds for the war effort. One of the driving forces, from the days of the Ginninderra Farmers' Union until 1944, was the Ginninderra blacksmith, Harry Curran, father of Babe Curran of Deasland, the district's preeminent wool grower. The Advance Hall and District Association organised a small district show in 1924 and 1925. The show of 1927 is officially recognised by the Royal National Capital Agricultural Society as the "inaugural" Canberra Show. The show continued to grow: the first two-day show was held in 1931, and the 1932 show was opened by Prime Minister J.A. Lyons. After a hiatus in the Second World War, the show resumed with the support of leading sheep breeder Sir Walter Merriman. In 1964, the show moved to its permanent home at the Canberra Showground. The Show was given "Royal" status in 1979.

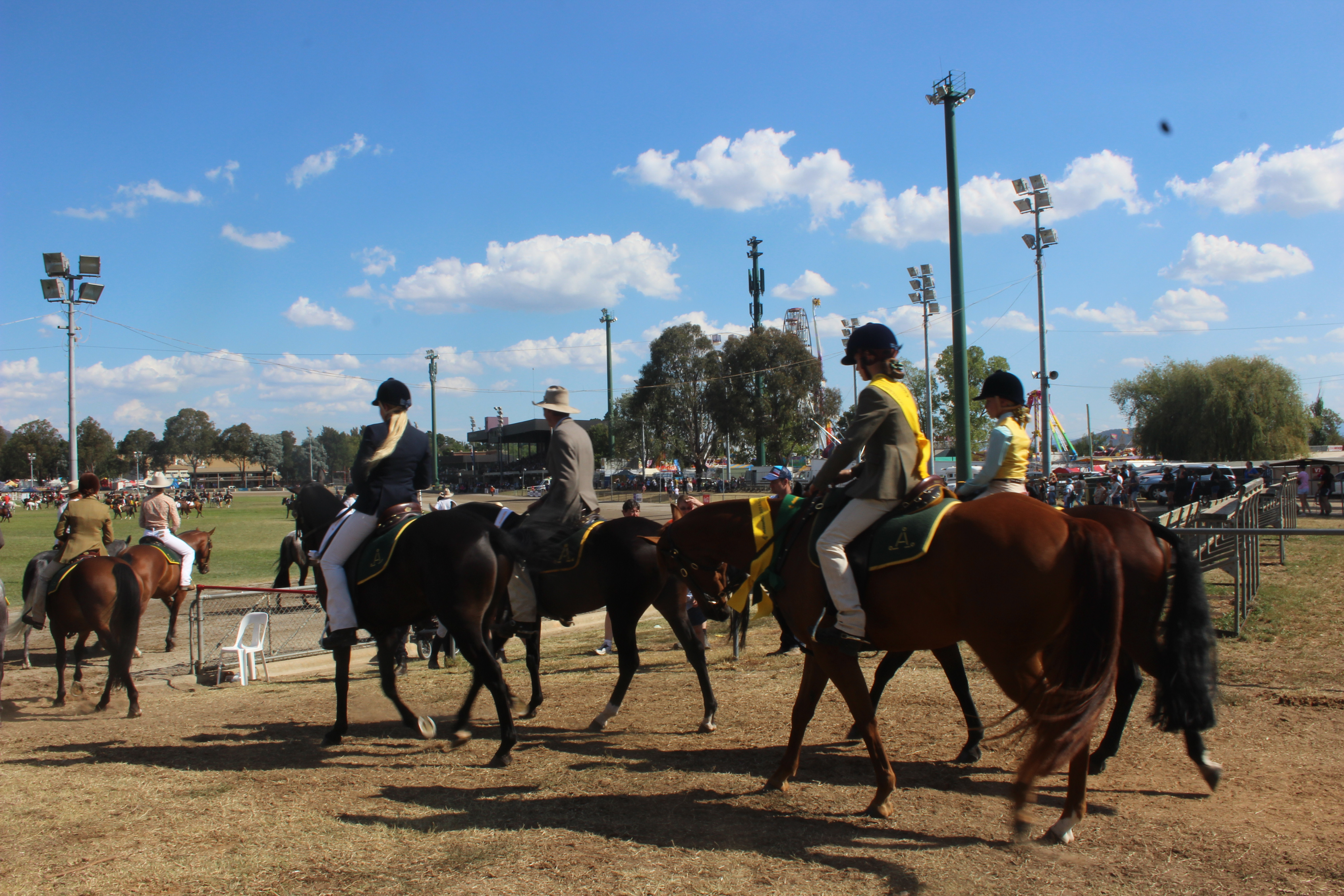
Royal Canberra Show, February 2015

The number of people who enter their livestock and other agricultural goods into the various competitions has increased, reflecting the significant role the Show plays in the development of the skills and excellence of those who live in the surrounding region, according to the Royal Canberra Show website.

In 2012, the show marked the International Year of the Farmer.

The 2021 Show, scheduled for late February, was cancelled in November 2020 due to the COVID-19 pandemic in Australia, the first cancellation since World War 2.
