= Ginninderra =

Former agricultural land in Canberra, Australia

Coordinates: 35°11′35″S 149°5′7″E

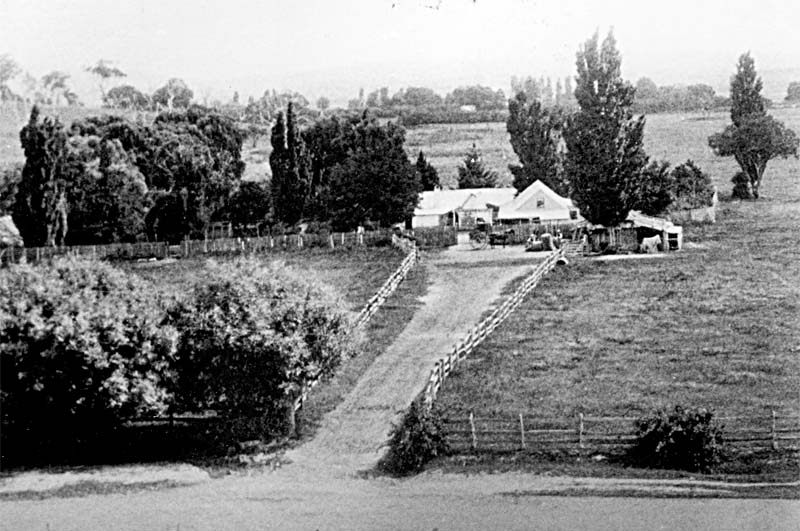
Ginninderra Store 1890s

Ginninderra is the name of the former agricultural lands surrendered to urban development on the western and north-western fringes of Canberra, the capital of Australia. Ginninderra corresponds with the watershed of Ginninderra Creek, which is now in part occupied by the Canberra districts of Belconnen and Gungahlin.

The word 'Ginninderra' is one of several - Molonglo, Gold Creek and Monaro are others - that hold longstanding connections to Canberra's local history. The Ginninderra Cricket Club, Ginninderra District High School and Ginninderra Labor Club are examples. One of the local ACT electorates is called Ginninderra. The name is celebrated through the place name Ginninderra Drive, an arterial road that traverses the Canberra district of Belconnen.

== Ginninderra Plain ==
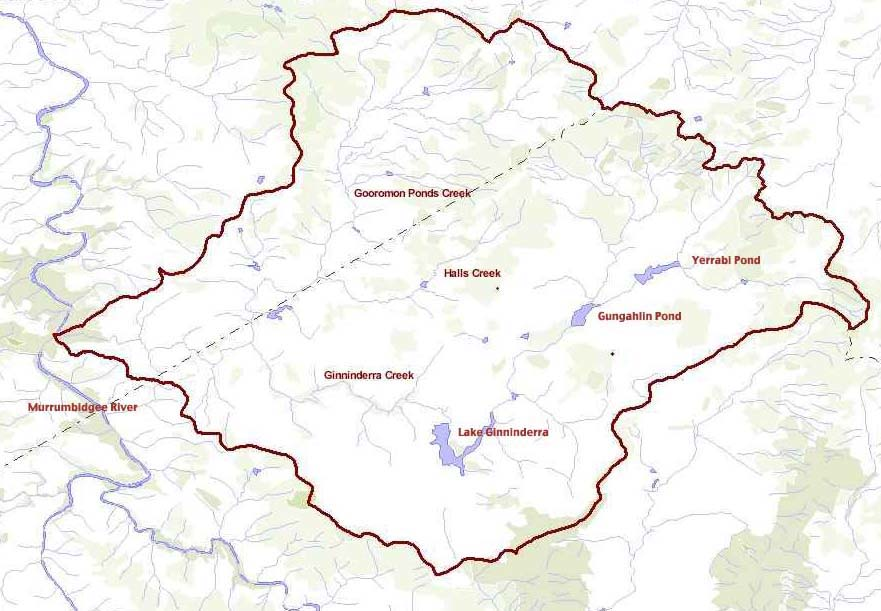
Ginninderra plain

The Ginninderra Plain is bound by the Spring Range and the NSW-ACT border to the north, by Black Mountain and the O'Connor Ridge to the east, by a line of hills leading west from Mount Payntor towards the Murrumbidgee River to the south and by the hills at Brookland (in NSW) and the Brindabella Ranges to the west. The plain contains the entire water catchment area of Ginninderra Creek, which empties into the Murrumbidgee River and forms part of the Murray-Darling Basin. The urban environs of the city of Canberra straddle the Ginninderra Plain, Molonglo Plains, the Limestone Plain, and the Tuggeranong Plain (Isabellas Plain).

== History ==
Indigenous Australian peoples have long inhabited what is now the ACT. Anthropologist Norman Tindale has suggested the principal group occupying the region were the Ngunnawal people, while the Ngarigo and Walgalu lived immediately to the south, the Wandandian to the east, the Gandangara to the north, and the Wiradjuri to the north-west. Earliest written reference to the area use the spelling 'Ginninginderry' though by mid 19th century the 'Ginninderra' variation was in general use. The name Ginninderra is derived from the Aboriginal word for the creek which flows through the district of Ginin-ginin-derry which is said to mean sparkling or throwing out little rays of light.

George Palmer established his Palmerville Estate in 1826 in Ginninginderry with a homestead located on the banks of Ginninderra Creek adjacent to the presentday suburb of Giralang. The estate encompassed much of what is now Belconnen and southern Gungahlin. It adjoined the Charnwood Estate to the west and Yarralumla Estate to the east. The combined area of the Ginninderra and Charnwood Estates was nearly 20,150 acres (8155 ha). Between the years 1830 and 1836, the colonial surveyor Robert Hoddle made several visits to the district, to survey property boundaries. He captured Ginninderra's wild beauty in watercolour and ink. The property was sold to William Davis, also from a prominent local family, and it continued to prosper.

The second wave of Ginninderra settlement began in the early 1850s with free settlers such as the Rolfe, Shumack, Southwell, Gillespie and Gribble families. These settlers established wheat and sheep properties such as 'Weetangara', 'Gold Creek','The Valley' and 'Tea Gardens'. During the mid 19th century Ginninderra was predominantly a wheat growing district especially for the smaller landholders. Much of the local produce supplied the large workforce at the region's goldfields located at Braidwood and Major's Creek. Harry Holland, the second leader of the New Zealand Labour Party, was born here in 1868.

During the first half of the twentieth century Ginninderra developed a reputation for high quality merino wool. Henry ‘Babe’ Curran of Deasland near Ginninderra Village achieved a world record price at auction. That year's record auction prices helped perpetuate the myth that the country's woolgrowers were all millionaires. The centre of the local wool industry was the Ginninderra Woolshed, the district’s largest, the site of which was located close to the present-day intersection of Gundaroo Drive and Baldwin Drive in the suburb of Giralang. The structure was demolished in the early 1970s to make way for the urban development of Belconnen.

Key events in Gininnderra:

Year	Event
1859	Ginninderra Post Office opens
1869	Telegraph service commences
1872	St Francis Church opens
1905	Bushfire destroys Ginninderra General Store
1914	Cricketers Arms Hotel destroyed by fire
1950	Ginniderra residents connected to the electricity supply
1962	Ginninderra Post Office and Ginninderra Schoolhouse close
1967	Foundation stone laid for establishment of Belconnen district
1990	Ginninderra Village renamed Gold Creek Village
1992	Palmerston, first suburb in Gungahlin district established

== Ginninderra Village ==
This collection of buildings became known as Ginninderra Village.

- The General Store survived until 1905 when it was destroyed by a bushfire.
- Ginninderra Blacksmith's Shop. Today this wood and corrugated iron structure represents one of the best-preserved examples of its type in Australia.
- Farmers' Union. This building was transported to the Hall Showground where it now serves as a sports pavilion
- Ginninderra Schoolhouse
- Police Station
- Ginnninderra Post Office. With the closure of the Ginninderra Post Office in the 1962, local commerce within Ginninderra shifted completely to the village of Hall.

Former St Francis Church of Ginninderra c.2004

- St Francis of Ginninderra Church. In 1872, the doors of St Francis of Ginninderra, a Roman Catholic Church opened to Sunday worship. This very modest bluestone building was located near the Ginninderra post office. St Francis also served for a time as a public school. The church closed when its congregation moved to St Francis Xavier Church located in Hall after it opened in April 1910.
- Old Tree Hill Sports Ground
- Cricketers Arm Hotel

== Decline ==
In 1962, with the retirement of local schoolteacher and postmaster, Richard O’Sullivan, the last of the Ginninderra Village original buildings, the post office and the Ginninderra Public School permanently closed. Students moved to the nearby Hall public School. The few remaining buildings in the former village are a timber hall (the former St Francis Church) and the Ginninderra Schoolhouse which are both located today within the tourist precinct of the Gold Creek Village in the suburb of Nicholls.

== Sources ==
- Fitzgerald, Alan (1987). Canberra in two centuries: A pictorial history. Clareville Press. ISBN 0-909278-02-4.
- Gillespie, Lyall (1984). Aborigines of the Canberra Region. Canberra: Wizard (self-published). pp. 1–25. ISBN 0-9590255-0-2.
