= George Gribble =

Australian farmer and soldier (1868-1947)

George Gribble (1868–1947) was an Australian farmer and soldier, who won renown in tent pegging and other sports.

== Early life and education ==
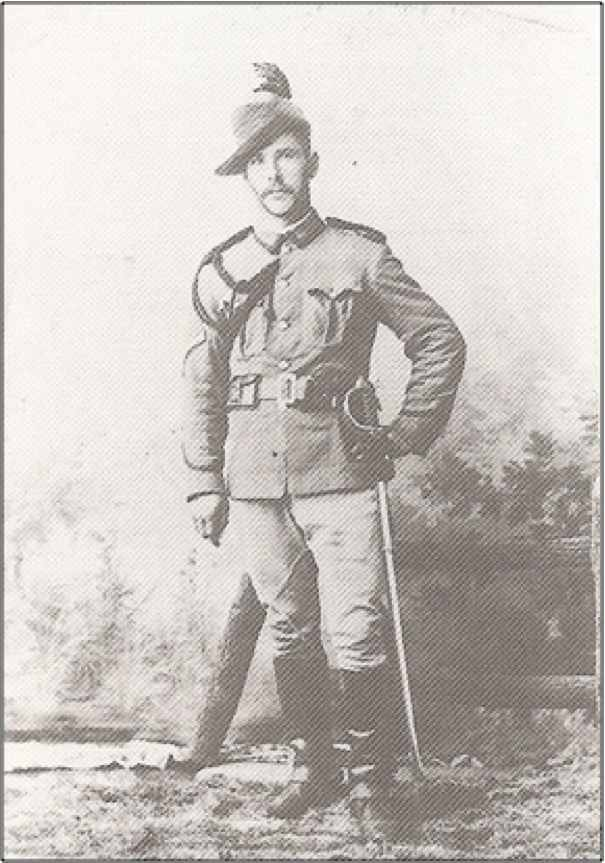
Farrier Sergeant George Gribble

Gribble was born in 1868 in Ginninderra (now known as ‘Gold Creek’ in the Australian Capital Territory). He was the fourth of the seven children of Thomas and Catherine Gribble.

== Farming ==
The Gribbles were innovative farmers and invested heavily in the latest technologies. They were the first farmers in the district to use the new steam-powered reaping and threshing machines, which they also hired-out.

== Military service ==
George Gribble served as a member of the New South Wales Mounted Rifles detachment established at Ginninderra. His ability as a horseman and all-round sportsman first came to attention when units were drilled before senior officers at Duntroon in 1893.

== Sportsman ==
In 1897 Farrier-Sergeant Gribble was one of four members selected to go to England for training and to represent the Colonies in military competitions in celebration of Queen Victoria's Jubilee. He won the prize for 'tent pegging on horseback with a lance' at the main military tournament in Dublin. Queen Victoria made the presentation of a silver cup, herself. He was awarded 28 points, with the next best competitor managing just 12. Back home, the Goulburn Evening Penny Post lauded his victory as follows.

The farrier-sergeant is to be highly complimented inasmuch as this was the only event (tent-pegging) in which the Colonial forces competed against the flower of the British Army, the Imperial Regular Cavalry units.

The Australian lancers also participated in London and Dublin in staged ‘frontier’ re-enactments for the crowds. Gribble was one of the stars portraying the capture by mounted police of a group of Australian bushrangers. The experiences of his father, who had been ‘bailed up’ by Ben Hall and his gang, when carting wool to Sydney in 1862, may have helped inform his performance.

During the Jubilee festivities, Gribble also won a buck-jumping contest from 35 contestants. In London, he also top-scored in a cricket match played against the English army's team, which the Australian troops won. At home, he was not only a prominent rugby footballer and cricketer, but he was also renowned as a champion steel-quoit player, being undefeated in local club competition for a period of ten years. Farrier Sergeant George Gribble may well have been the Canberra district's first international sporting star.

== Adult life ==
In 1893 he was brought before the Queanbeyan Police Court to answer a charge of stealing seed-corn from another farmer stowed at the Ginninderra Blacksmith's Shop. He was acquitted and there is no other example in his record, thereafter, to suggest that he was dishonest, or that there may have been any substance to the allegation.

At home, he made a good living as a partner in the Gribble brothers’ butcher's shop in the village of Hall and in hiring out the family's farm equipment.

In April 1907 a worker on the family's traction engine had his arm caught and mangled in the chaff-cutter. Gribble's quick response and the first aid he rendered the victim was said to have saved the man's life, although not his arm.

In 1908, during a visit to Sydney, Gribble suffered a serious accident, when he was hit by an oncoming tram.

George Gribble's nephew, Ernie, died from terrible injuries after being trapped in the fly-wheel during an accident with the family's traction engine.

Gribble married late in life. In 1910, aged 42, he wed Margaret Courtney Moore in Queanbeyan, where they settled. They had one son together. George spent the remaining years of his working life employed as an engine driver. He died on 7 June 1947, aged 79.
