= Henry 'Babe' Curran =

Australian woll grower

Henry 'Babe' Curran (1896–1964) was one of the most successful Australian woolgrowers during the industry's boom in the 1940s and 1950s.

== Biography ==
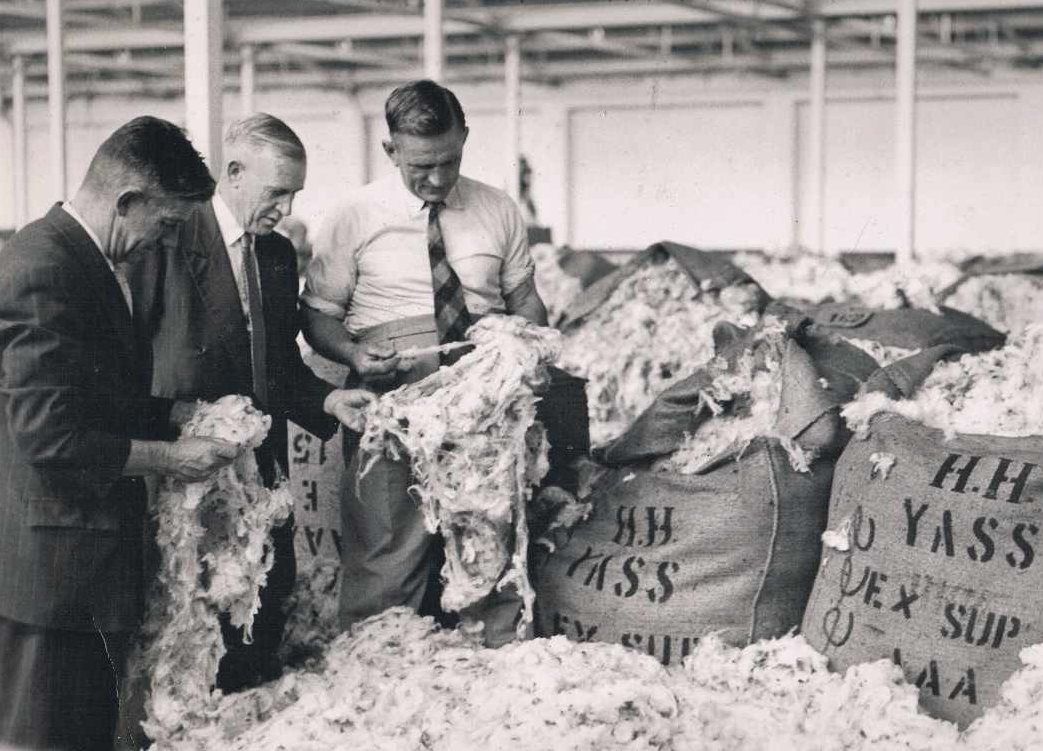
Photograph taken on 1 December 1954, when Henry 'Babe' Curran (standing on the right) of Ginninderra set two Commonwealth records at the Goulburn wool sales. The records were: (i) top price for the best wool (205d for 1 lb) for the season; and (ii) top price paid for 'broken wool' (132d for 1 lb) for the season.

Born Henry Everard Curran on 1 December 1896 at Ginninderra (now called 'Gold Creek' in the Australian Capital Territory), Curran was widely known as 'Babe'. His mother, Agnes Gribble, was from an innovative farming family of the district. His father, Henry Roland Curran, ran the Ginninderra Blacksmith's Shop. His grandfather was the Catholic journalist, Henry Joseph Curran. Curran married Amy Reid from Tallagandra in 1921. Together, they reared four children.

Curran commenced his working life as a farmhand, but he remained focused on getting his own flock from an early age. As he had very limited resources, he had to build up his holdings and bloodline slowly. He bought a number of rundown properties throughout the district, starting with George Harcourt's 'Deasland' in 1927. He improved the pasture and the quality of his breeding stock, as best he could. His clip, which sold under the 'HH Yass' brand (pictured), was primarily developed from a mob of 'expired' Merryville merino ewes, bought cheaply in 1919.

Once he had everything in place, the records flowed. Curran achieved the top price for a clip from the Australian Capital Territory for at least 29 seasons over the period 1933 to 1964. His clips briefly held the top price under the wartime appraisement scheme (i.e. when open markets were closed over the 1939-1944 seasons). He topped the Goulburn or Sydney wool sales on 19 occasions; set the state and national records for top price for eight seasons; achieved the Commonwealth record price for six seasons; as well as four separate world record prices. His wool was also the first to gain £100 for a single bale and he was the first Australian grazier to earn £1 for 1 lb of wool (i.e. a 'pound for pound'). His world record price of 435d, set in 1945, was recorded when two Milanese buyers competed, head-to-head, for his clip. Surprisingly, these records were all achieved with flocks primarily pastured on land now covered by Canberra's outer northern suburbs.

Babe Curran died on 14 October 1964 from a heart attack.
