= Rochester Police Department (Minnesota) =

- Abbreviation: RPD

Agency overview
- Formed: 1906

Jurisdictional structure
- Operations jurisdiction: Rochester, Minnesota, USA
- Map of Rochester Police Department's jurisdiction
- Area: 39.8 square miles (103 km^{2})
- Population: 115,733
- General nature: Local civilian police

Operational structure
- Headquarters: 101 4th Street SE; Rochester, Minnesota 55904
- Police Officers: 140
- Unsworn members: 64
- Agency executive: James Franklin, Chief of Police

Website
- Rochester Police Department

The Rochester Police Department (RPD) is the main law enforcement agency with jurisdiction over the City of Rochester, Minnesota. It was established in 1906. It currently has 204 employees.

The Department is made up of a police chief, 4 police captains, 9 police lieutenants, 25 police sergeants, and a combination of police officers and investigators that add up to about 102 total. There are around 60 non-sworn personnel.

The department states that it subscribes to a philosophy of Intelligence Led Policing.

== Rank structure ==
| Title | Insignia | Role |
|---|---|---|
| Chief of Police | | Chief of Department |
| Captain | | Acts and starts as an administrative position |
| Lieutenant | | |
| Sergeant | | |
| Police Officer / Investigator | None | |

== Organization ==
The Rochester Police Department conducts business under the Patrol, Investigations and Services Divisions. Each Division contributes to the operations of the Department. In addition, there are Specialty Units that operate in conjunction with each Division.

=== Patrol Division ===
Units associated with the Patrol Division include:

- Police Training Officers
- K-9 Unit
- Special Enforcement
- School Liaison Enforcement
- Community Service Officers
- Community Action Team
- Animal Control
- Parking Control

=== Specialty Units ===
- Emergency Response Unit (ERU)
- Forensic Mapping Unit (FMU)
- Crime Scene Unit
- Crisis Intervention Team
- Honor Guard
- Prolific Offender Unit
- Drone Operators
- DWI Enforcement
- Law Enforcement Phlebotomist
- DMT/G Operator
- Drug Recognition Expert (DRE)

=== Services ===
- Staff Development/Training
- Fleet Maintenance
- Records Division
- Evidence Division
- Planning/Technology
- Communications Center
- Crime Prevention
