= GiveSendGo =

American Christian crowdfunding website

- Website type: Crowdfunding
- Available in: 18 languages
- Founded: 2014
- Headquarters: Dover, Delaware, US
- Founders: Heather Wilson, Jacob Wells
- Revenue: $4–5 million (2022)
- Employees: 30 (as of 2022)
- Website: givesendgo.com
- Commercial: Yes
- Registration: Optional
- Launched: October 2015
- Current status: Online
- Written in: Nuxt (Vue.js)

GiveSendGo is an American "Christian" crowdfunding website launched in 2015 as an alternative to GoFundMe. The site engages in limited content moderation, citing freedom of speech. Identified as an alt-tech platform, GiveSendGo has attracted controversy for allowing far-right extremists including neo-Nazis, white supremacists and hate groups to fundraise.

== History and philosophy ==
The website was founded in 2014 to fundraise "for missionary trips, medical expenses for needy families, and other charitable causes", and because the founders perceived GoFundMe to have an anti-Christian bias.

GoFundMe, a major crowdfunding platform, prohibits in its terms of service any "campaigns that raise money to cover the legal defense of anyone formally charged with an alleged violent crime" as well as campaigns promoting hate and intolerance. GiveSendGo first rose to prominence after it allowed several campaigns to fundraise that GoFundMe had previously removed, in particular for Kyle Rittenhouse, rioters who attacked the U.S. Capitol on January 6, and the Canada convoy protest.

GiveSendGo's founders have described it as a fundraising platform that values freedom and rejects censorship, stating that platforms should not restrict legal activities. The founders have stated "that the danger of the suppression of speech is much more dangerous than the speech itself" and emphasized the importance of the presumption of innocence for those accused of crimes and the ability to fundraise for a legal defense.

=== Relationship to right-wing extremism ===
In January 2022, the British anti-disinformation organization Logically reported that GiveSendGo was the hub for a far-right funding network that included QAnon supporters, anti-vaccine activists and the far-right group Project Veritas. A January 2023 report by the Anti-Defamation League (ADL) stated that GiveSendGo had hosted 230 fundraising campaigns tied to extremist groups and causes. The ADL described GiveSendGo as "a singularly important part of the extremist fundraising ecosystem" that enabled extremist groups to raise $5.4 million since 2016.

Critics have labeled GiveSendGo as "alt-tech".

=== Data breaches ===
GiveSendGo has been hacked several times.

==== April 2021 data breach ====
In April 2021, internal company data was leaked to Distributed Denial of Secrets (DDoSecrets), which made donor information from GiveSendGo available to journalists and researchers. The information identified previously anonymous high-dollar donors to far-right actors including members of the Proud Boys, many of whose fundraising efforts were directly related to the 2021 United States Capitol attack. The platform had previously been criticized for its refusal to restrict use by far-right extremists. The leaks also revealed that police officers and public officials in the United States had donated to Kyle Rittenhouse. In May 2021, USA Today used the GiveSendGo data to report that nearly $100,000 was raised for the Proud Boys on GiveSendGo from people of Chinese descent in the days before the 2021 Capitol attack. The following month, they used the data to report that a member of the Koch family had anonymously donated to a crowdfunding campaign supporting 2020 election fraud conspiracy theories.

==== February 2022 data breaches ====
In February 2022, after many anonymous donors supported the 2022 Freedom Convoy, DDoSecrets began providing journalists and researchers with a hacked list of donors' personal information from GiveSendGo. Later that month, GiveSendGo was hacked again, exposing donors for every campaign in the site's history, which DDoSecrets gave to journalists and researchers.

A report by TechCrunch on February 8, 2022, noted that a security lapse had exposed the personal information of donors.

On the early morning of February 11, 2022, the GiveSendGo website was hacked and redirected to givesendgone.wtf, which displayed a message condemning the website, the Freedom Convoy, and their sympathizers as a threat to democracy. A video from the Disney film Frozen II was set as a backdrop to the statement calling the donors and protesters "hatriots", "grifters", and "assholes" and focusing on scenarios of domestic or foreign influenced insurgencies disguised as protests.

A link to a .csv file, allegedly containing names of Freedom Convoy donors, was also posted. Shortly after the hack was noticed and began trending on the social media, the website domain was restored. The GiveSendGo website was not operational as of February 14, instead, displaying the message "Application is under maintenance we will be back very soon."

A data breach on February 13, 2022, was reported by Vice News. The breach revealed the personal details of 92,845 donors to the Freedom Convoy fundraising campaign, including a $90,000 donation by American software billionaire Thomas Siebel. Of the 92,845 donations, 55.7% of donors were from the United States, and 39% from Canada. Some of the American donors' names correspond to the names of donors to Donald Trump's campaigns. Some members of the Ontario Provincial Police (OPP) were revealed to have donated to the convoy on GiveSendGo, prompting the OPP to launch an internal conduct investigation.

A data breach on February 15, 2022, was reported by The Daily Dot. The data included a full database dump, source code for their Bitbucket repo, information from their customer service systems and some credit card information. The Daily Dot claimed GiveSendGo had been warned about the vulnerability in 2018. Several of the donors reported harassment and professional consequences after their names were published online.

On February 24, 2022, another data breach was reported by The Daily Dot. The data included more information on donors to the Freedom Convoy fundraiser.

== Notable campaigns ==
=== Kyle Rittenhouse ===
A GiveSendGo campaign for Kyle Rittenhouse raised over $250,000, while similar campaigns on GoFundMe were removed. In response, Discover blocked transactions toward GiveSendGo. It was the Kyle Rittenhouse campaign that is cited as the event that gave GiveSendGo its reputation as a refuge for campaigns too controversial for other crowdfunding sites. The leak published by DDoSecrets also revealed that police officers and public officials in the United States had donated to Rittenhouse.

=== Daniel Penny ===
Daniel Penny, a US Marine Corps veteran charged in the chokehold death of Jordan Neely, raised more than 2.9 million dollars.

=== 2021 United States Capitol attack ===
PayPal suspended payments to GiveSendGo because it was raising funds for people who had participated in the 2021 United States Capitol attack. In January 2021, after receiving objections from Stripe, one of their payment processing providers, GiveSendGo suspended the ability for users to donate to pages associated with the Proud Boys, Oath Keepers, and 2020 election fraud conspiracy theories.

=== 2022 Canadian convoy protests ===
In early February 2022, supporters of the trucker convoy occupying Ottawa, the Canadian capital, and blocking border crossings between Canada and the U.S. to protest COVID-19 vaccine mandates and restrictions, raised over $9 million on the GiveSendGo platform.

On February 10, 2022, a statement was issued by Ontario's premier, Doug Ford, stating that the Ontario Superior Court of Justice, upon request from the Ontario provincial Government, has granted a restraining order against the company, intended to freeze all donations raised for the protesters. The GiveSendGo founders responded on Twitter that any funds raised via GiveSendGo flow directly to the campaign recipients, denied that the funds are actually frozen, and denied that Canada has jurisdiction over GiveSendGo management.

During parliamentary questioning in March 2022, co-founder Jacob Wells stated that because of GiveSendGo's firm stance on free speech, even if individuals belonged to groups such the Ku Klux Klan and the Proud Boys, they would still be permitted to fundraise on their website, provided the activity was legal.

=== Convoy to Canberra ===
The Convoy to Canberra anti-vaccine mandate protest in Australia was organized on GiveSendGo, among other platforms.

=== Luigi Mangione ===
A legal defense fund was established by "The December 4th Legal Committee" for Luigi Mangione, the shooter involved with the killing of UnitedHealthCare CEO Brian Thompson. As of May 2025, the fund has raised over US$1 million. Mangione's defense attorney Karen Friedman Agnifilo told Newsweek that Mangione is "aware of the fund and very much appreciates the outpouring of support" and "plans on utilizing it to fight all three of the unprecedented cases against him".

=== 2025 fundraisers ===
The family of Karmelo Anthony, the convicted perpetrator in the killing of Austin Metcalf, started a campaign in April 2025. The fundraiser has raised over $515,000 by May 1, and had received significant financial support from the Black community. In early May of the same year, a woman who claimed to be the woman in the Rochester, Minnesota racial slur video, began a campaign titled "Help Me Protect My Family". As of May 6, it has raised over $700,000. Some conservatives said they saw the campaign for the woman "as a form of backlash" for the funds raised for the accused in the Metcalf stabbing incident the month prior. On May 2, GiveSendGo disabled the comments on both fundraiser pages, citing "unacceptable volume of racist and derogatory remarks". GiveSendGo co-founder Jacob Wells said: "At the time comments were turned off, both campaigns had raised approximately $500,000 with around 15,000 donors each."

In May 2025, Mohammed Adnan Khan, "Mo Khan," raised $16,000 thus far. Mohammed (or people supporting him) created two other GiveSendGo fundraisers so far as well. Mohammed created the campaign after he received significant backlash for posting a video of his involvement in purchasing a sign that stated "Fuck the Jews" at the Barstool Sports Samson street bar in Philadelphia. Dave Portnoy found out about the video and reached out to Mo Khan to address the situation. Mo was initially apologetic and even agreed to go to Auschwitz concentration camp in Poland to educate himself on the Holocaust. However, the next day, Khan turned course and started his GiveSendGo campaign, requesting donations as a result of his claimed "edgy joke." Mohammed accused Portnoy of "hypocritically lynching" him. He then went on the Stew Peters show, a white nationalist internet show, to promote his campaign, where he received a further $100,000 in JPROOF crypto coin.

In December 2025, a fundraiser for a former Cinnabon worker based in Ashwaubenon, Wisconsin, raised nearly $100,000. The worker was a subject of a viral video where she harassed a Somali couple with racial slurs after mocking the woman's hijab. In response to the video, Cinnabon released a statement on Twitter stating that the employee had been immediately fired, as their actions "do not reflect our values or the welcoming experience every guest deserves".
