= Deasland =

Homestead in Canberra, Australia

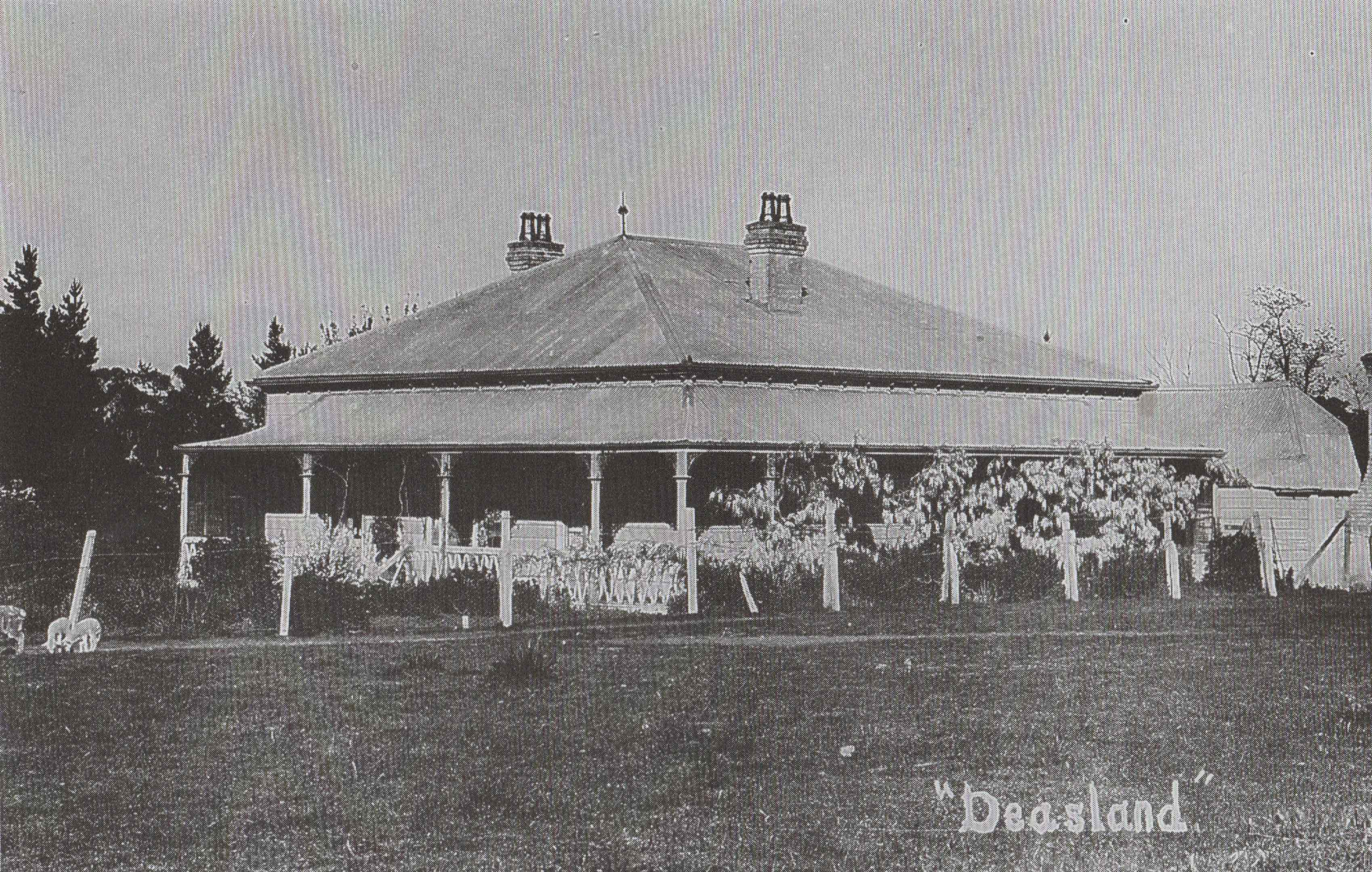
- One of the earliest known photographs of Deasland homestead, Ginninderra, c. 1910
- Interactive map of the Deasland area

General information
- Location: Canberra, Australia
- Coordinates: 35°11′43″S 149°05′20″E
- Completed: 1893
- Demolished: 2022

Design and construction
- Main contractor: Lazarus and Holland

Deasland was a historic homestead at Ginninderra (now called Gold Creek) in Canberra’s north on the Barton Highway. It was demolished in early 2022 due to 'Mr Fluffy' asbestos contamination.

== History ==
Deasland was commissioned by Ginninderra storekeeper, George Harcourt, between 1890 and 1893 and built by contractors Lazarus and Holland. It was a six-room, single-story timber homestead with verandahs and iron roof. There is also a heritage-listed brick dairy.

George Harcourt was born in 1842 at Edgbaston, England. He seems to have named the property after ‘Deasland Farm’ in Worcestershire, where his parents were married in 1819. But he only enjoyed his new home for a short time, as he died in December 1893. Harcourt had started out as William Davis’ bookkeeper around 1860 and went on to serve as Ginninderra storekeeper and postmaster. The Harcourts also farmed in the district and were prominent in civic affairs. After George's death, Millicent Harcourt (née Ward) and her children, remained in Deasland and grew wheat and sheep on its 685 acres until the land was resumed in 1913 for the new Australian Federal Capital Territory. Deasland, along with many other buildings in Ginninderra, were almost destroyed by bushfire in 1905.

Two short-term tenants - Edward Boreham followed by Joseph Burgoyne - occupied Deasland after the Harcourts. Burgoyne had been prominent in the Ginninderra Farmers' Union. In 1916 John and Edith Edmonds took over the lease and farmed the area. The Edmonds family moved to Burrowa in 1926.

In January 1927, the Curran family purchased the Deasland lease. Henry Curran, known as ‘Babe’, was the local blacksmith's son, who had married Amy Reid of Tallagandra in 1921. They had been living in the old Ginninderra cottage (at modern Giralang) with their two infant daughters, before they could afford to purchase the Deasland lease. Curran's father's blacksmith shop, which is also heritage-listed, has survived, next door to Deasland. The Currans owned Deasland for 44 years and built up its pasturage to 1,178 acres. Curran became one of Australia's premier woolgrowers, setting a range of world, Commonwealth and NSW record prices for a flock, primarily pastured at Ginninderra in the late 1940s and throughout the 1950s. Curran was also an accomplished sportsman and benefactor of the local community.

The Currans improved Deasland's pasture, renovated the homestead itself, and constructed a large woolshed, hayshed, shearers’ quarters and a farmhand's cottage. They sunk a bore, built dams and even laid an ant-bed-clay tennis court. Babe Curran died unexpectedly in 1964. His son, Richard, wound up the estate, with the family finally departing in late 1971. The property was no longer operated as a high-yield sheep station.

During the 1990s, the homestead and other parts of the former dairy were listed on the former Register of the National Estate.

After a few short-term tenants came the MacKinnon family, who have lived at Deasland from 1975. During the latter years, many of the outbuildings, including the large shearing shed, were demolished. The property shrank to a few acres around the homestead and dairy, as Canberra's suburbs and golf links encroached.

Deasland Place in the Canberra suburb of Fraser was named after the homestead on 13 April 1976.

== Demolition ==
Deasland was listed for demolition in 2015, as it was contaminated by loose fill asbestos insulation, probably introduced around 1973.

The homestead was demolished in early 2022. The owners of the property attempted to have a small part of Deasland preserved as a memorial, but permission to do so was refused by the ACT Government's Asbestos Response Taskforce.
