= Mr Fluffy =

Australian asbestos contamination incident

Dig X Investments Pty. Limited
- An "Asbestosfluf" advertisement
- Formerly: D. Jansen & Co. Pty. Limited (1968 – ?)
- Type: Private
- Industry: Insulation
- Founded: 23 January 1968; 58 years ago
- Founder: Dirk Jansen
- Defunct: 21 February 1989; 37 years ago
- Headquarters: Canberra, Australia
- Area served: Canberra
- Products: Loose-fill asbestos insulation
- Brands: Asbestosfluf

Mr Fluffy relates to widespread asbestos contamination of houses in the suburbs of Canberra, the capital city of Australia. Two companies were referred to collectively as "Mr Fluffy", a nickname coined in the 1990s for Asbestosfluf Insulations, and its successor J&H Insulation. The former was run by Canberra businessman Dirk Jansen, and the latter owned by a relative of his. The business only took on that name "Mr Fluffy" after he sold it.

The companies imported and installed fibrous, loose-fill amphibole asbestos, in most cases brown amosite from South Africa, although blue crocidolite has been detected. It was blown into the roof spaces of homes during the 1960s and 1970s, to provide thermal insulation. The companies are also believed to have sold sacks of asbestos fibre direct to home owners to insulate their own homes, and other operators may have also used the hazardous material, trying to copy Jansen's business model.

== Medical dangers ==
At the time, there was limited public knowledge about the dangers of exposure to asbestos. Subsequently, cases of mesothelioma, asbestosis, lung cancer, and other asbestos-related diseases have become well publicised. Testing in the affected houses revealed the ongoing possibility of exposure to loose asbestos fibres. The loose-fill amosite asbestos used by Mr Fluffy was especially hazardous, because its lack of a bonding agent allowed it to migrate easily to hidden corners and cracks inside a residence.

== Affected areas ==
In 2015, the Government of the Australian Capital Territory released a list of places affected by Mr Fluffy insulation contamination, which totalled 1,022 properties. It is believed that up to 30,000 people may have been affected over the years.

A significant number of the houses were developed in the Radburn scheme suburbs, Charnwood, Curtin and Garran, and a small part of Hughes. In 2014, with plans for demolition of houses under the Mr Fluffy asbestos home demolition scheme being developed, it was realised that a significant number of the houses treated with loose asbestos, and thus affected, were in the Radburn areas. This was recognised as having the potential to degrade the remaining legacy of the Radburn scheme.

Loose-fill asbestos has also been found in locations far removed from Canberra, including three confirmed locations in Lithgow, New South Wales, which is approximately 200 kilometres from Canberra. The New South Wales Government announced a buyback scheme for affected properties.

Dirk Jansen ran his company from his family home in Lyons and stored bags of asbestos fluff under his house.

== Investigation and clean-up ==
Jansen started using asbestos as an insulation as early as 1967, and began using it in loose form in 1968, prompting a Commonwealth Government investigation within months. However, despite a subsequent report that indicated community exposure to asbestos was potentially "undesirable", he kept working until 1978. Jansen died in 2001 in a nursing home from a heart attack after suffering from Alzheimers for several years.

Prompted by growing public concern about the hazards of asbestos in general, and Mr Fluffy's product in particular, a Commonwealth audit in 1988 identified most of the homes in the ACT containing the insulation. Between 1989 and 1993, a clean-up program was conducted by the new ACT Government, and was thought to have remediated the problem in about 1,040 homes identified in the audit. However, residual asbestos was later found in some of the cleaned houses and others were missed altogether. That led to the creation of a community action group of affected home owners, that campaigned for a change in the policy relating to the future of their residences.

In response, a home demolition scheme was negotiated between the Government of the Australian Capital Territory and the Government of Australia in 2014. It involved a loan of about A$1 billion from the Australian Government to the ACT Government to fund the purchase of houses treated with loose-fill asbestos fibre insulation in the 1960s and 1970s, the safe demolition of those houses, and the sale of the land for redevelopment. The proceeds of the sales were to be used to assist the repayment of the loan. The first demolitions under the scheme began in July 2015.

A number of heritage homes have also been affected and will be lost, including Deasland, one of Canberra's most important historic homesteads, which was built by George Harcourt in 1893 and was demolished in early 2022.

No legal case was ever brought against the Jansen family and the use of amosite asbestos was not banned in Australia until 1989.
