= Thomas Lodge (publican) =

Australian publican

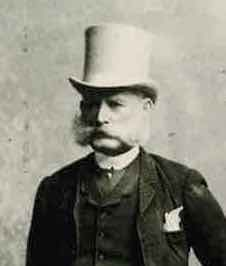
Thomas Lodge (c. 1885)

Thomas Lodge was a publican in Breadalbane, who was falsely accused of abetting Ben Hall and his gang in 1865. Although acquitted, he was stripped of government contracts and bankrupted. Lodge was born in Leicester, England in 1830 and died in Mandurama, NSW, in 1906.

== Early life ==
Thomas Lodge was the son of Henry Lodge and Rebecca Facer. After ten of their children had died in the Bradford slums, the parents emigrated with their son Thomas and infant daughter, Caroline, to Australia in 1842, eventually farming a small holding at Menangle. Henry's brother, James Lodge, was a Luddite who had been transported to Australia for rebellion in 1817. He had painted a favourable picture of Australia and encouraged his brother's emigration.

== Lodge's hotels in Breadalbane ==
In 1853, Thomas Lodge married Mary Anne Lee at Campbelltown. Soon after the marriage they moved to Breadalbane to run a hotel that was known alternatively as The Red House or Yabber Joe's. Lodge's parents, Henry and Rebecca, soon moved to nearby Goulburn where they took over a traveller's inn, The John Barleycorn.

Eventually, the younger Lodges purchased their own block and in 1858 built a large new stone hotel, which they called the Breadalbane Hotel. The building has survived today as the historic homestead now known as Sweetwood Lea. The Breadalbane Hotel became the local Post Office and Lodge was also awarded a number of road construction contracts.

== Breadalbane sectarianism ==
The Lodge family and their hotel became the focus for Breadalbane's fledgling Catholic community. Bishop John Bede Polding held Mass at the hotel.

Lodge had earlier clashed with his former landlord, James Chisholm, the Protestant squire, over his purchase of the block and the new hotel that was established in direct competition with Chisholm's Red House. Although Lodge had a good relationship with the local Catholic constables (M'Connell and Brennan), he was to become a target for the largely Protestant Goulburn police, who saw the Breadalbane Catholics as the unruly core of local support for Ben Hall and other bushrangers.

A false-claim was made against Lodge by a teenage informant in police custody that Lodge had received a stolen saddle from gang member, John Gilbert.

== The police raids on Lodge's hotel and Thomas Byrne's farm ==
Matters deteriorated when the Lodges' Breadalbane Hotel was used as a stopover by the Hall gang after it had held up the Yass Mail. Lodge's brother-in-law, Henry Curran, wrote up the incident, embarrassing the government, which was intent on capturing Hall and quashing support for his gang at the local level. When tipped off by an informer that Hall was in the district, a Goulburn police party, led by Deputy Police Magistrate Augustus Huthwaite, surrounded the hotel and apprehended the 20+ guests and staff while they prepared to launch a surprise raid on the Byrnes family farm, nearby.

At this time, Lodge alleged that the police party were drunk and mistreated his guests and children.

Early in the following morning, the police party surprised Hall, Gilbert and John Dunne in a barn outside Byrne's farm. After a shoot-out in which men on both sides were wounded, the bushrangers escaped barefoot across a field.

== The trial of Thomas Lodge ==
Thomas Lodge was eventually tried for receiving the stolen saddle. The case was quickly dismissed. He was defended by prominent Catholic barrister William Dalley (a friend of Polding). The teenage informant had alleged that he sold the saddle to Lodge at 'full price', which the jury found to be a ludicrous proposition. At his trial, Lodge repeated his claim that the police had targeted him unfairly and that they had been drunk when they had taken over his hotel. He lodged a formal complaint with the Colonial Secretary, Charles Cowper, but his letter was dismissed and none of the 20+ witnesses, including the school teachers, were interviewed.

Shortly after the trial, Lodge was stripped of the postal contract and the payment of his road contract was delayed without explanation. This forced him and his father into bankruptcy. It is claimed that sectarianism played a role in the persecution of Lodge.

== Later life ==
After these events in Breadalbane, the Lodge family moved to Marulan and then to the Jacqua goldfields before settling permanently at Mandurama. They became, once again, respected members of the local community, running the post office, undertaking government contracts, farming and teaching music.

In the literature and film concerning Ben Hall, Lodge is portrayed as a bush telegraph and supporter of the gang, even though there is no evidence of this and he was acquitted of the only abetting charge brought against him.

Mary Anne Lodge died in 1899. Thomas Lodge died in 1906.

== Thomas Lodge in literature ==
- F. Clune, Ben Hall, 1970 (originally released as Wild Colonial Boys, Arkon, London)
- D. J. Shiel, Ben Hall, Bushranger, University of Queensland Press, St Lucia, 1983.

== Thomas Lodge in film ==
- The Legend of Ben Hall, Directed by Matthew Holmes, 2016. Lodge is played by Peter Bromley.
