= Henry Joseph Curran =

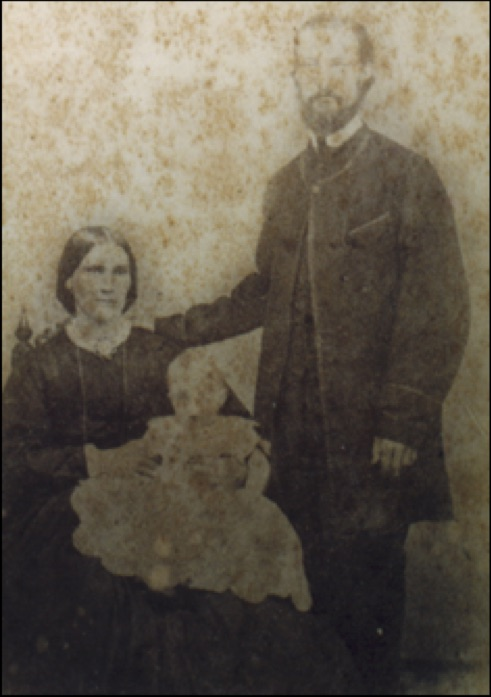
Henry and Anne Curran, c. 1873

Henry Joseph Curran (1843-1882) was an Australian journalist and leading figure in the Catholic communities in Goulburn and Boorowa in the 1860s and 1870s. Curran worked for newspapers in Goulburn, established and edited the Burrowa Advocate and also worked in Sydney on the Freeman's Journal.

== Biography ==
Curran was born in Gundaroo in 1843. His parents, Joseph Curran, a shepherd, and Margaret Conba, a dairy maid, both from Cork, arrived in Sydney through the assisted passage scheme on the Lascar in 1841. The Currans were indentured workers on the farms of the MacLeod family at ‘Maryvale’ in Liverpool and then ‘Barnsdale’ in Gundaroo, before moving to 'The Oaks' near Queanbeyan in 1847. By 1861, Joseph Curran had deserted his wife and family. Although she had been left destitute and was taken to court by her husband’s creditors, she managed to keep the family together and raise her seven children on her own in Queanbeyan.

In 1857, thirteen-year-old Curran won an apprenticeship at the Goulburn Chronicle and Southern Advertiser, which had been recently established by William Vernon and Ludolf Mellin. Life was not easy for the apprentices at the paper, with the family of one boy taking Mellin to court over cruel treatment. The Chronicle was taken over in 1864 by its less-liberal rival, the Goulburn Herald and County of Argyle Advertiser, owned by William Riley and Breadalbane’s absentee squire, James Chisholm. The two papers merged into the Goulburn Herald and Chronicle. Curran eventually became one of its senior journalists.

During the 1860s, Curran also became active in Goulburn’s literary societies and a leader of the local Catholic community, including serving as president of the Goulburn Catholic Literary Society. He became closely aligned with prominent priests, Rev. Patrick Dunne and his nephew, Rev. John Dunne. The Dunnes had a history of promoting social issues and Curran promoted their causes in his work.

In 1865, Curran married Anne Lodge, who was from a family of Catholic publicans of the Goulburn-Breadalbane district. Her father, Henry Lodge, was the proprietor of the John Barleycorn Inn. Anne’s brother, Thomas Lodge, had been the proprietor of The Coach and Horses (known as the Red House) at Breadalbane as a tenant of James Chisholm, before building his own Breadalbane Hotel in 1858, which became a centre for the local Catholic community, before the church was built. It even hosted visits by Archbishop John Polding.

In 1865, Curran and Lodge were caught up in the colonial government’s efforts to quash bushranging, in particular, curtailing Ben Hall. The government was suspicious that Catholic enclaves were sheltering Hall and his gang. When Curran wrote up his account of Hall’s hold-up of the Yass Mail in which the passengers were taken to his brother-in-law’s Breadlabane Hotel and shouted lunch by the gang, the authorities came down hard. They did not want Hall presented as a hero and Chisholm was no friend of Lodge. The police raided Lodge’s hotel, and he faced trumped-up charges of receiving stolen goods. This occurred shortly before an early morning raid on nearby Byrne’s farm, where Hall’s gang was surprised and almost captured after a fierce gunfight. Inadvertently, Curran’s article had been instrumental in his brother-in-law’s demise. Lodge lost government mail and road contracts and then his publican’s license. His father-in-law was also bankrupted and walked away from the John Barleycorn.

In 1873 he was approached by the Dunnes to set up a new paper at Boorowa, where John Dunne was the new priest tasked with reforming the parish. Curran established the Burrowa Advocate in August 1873, but due to divisions within the community arising from Dunne’s reforms, the paper failed to gather enough support to survive. Curran was financially ruined.

Curran became a journalist with the Freeman’s Journal in Surry Hills, Sydney by 1875. After Anne died prematurely in 1880, he struggled with alcoholism and became gravely ill himself, unable to work. His youngest child, Francis, aged 16 months, was put into an orphanage, while his eldest son, Henry Roland Curran, tried to support the remaining children on a factory worker’s wage. Henry Joseph Curran died of liver failure in March 1882. His children were split between their uncles. Two were adopted by his brother-in-law Thomas Lodge, another two by his elder brother Patrick Curran, and Henry junior was apprenticed to his uncle, George Curran, at the Ginninderra Blacksmith's Shop. His grandson, was the renowned Canberra woolgrower, Henry 'Babe' Curran.
