= Pel-Air =

Australian airline

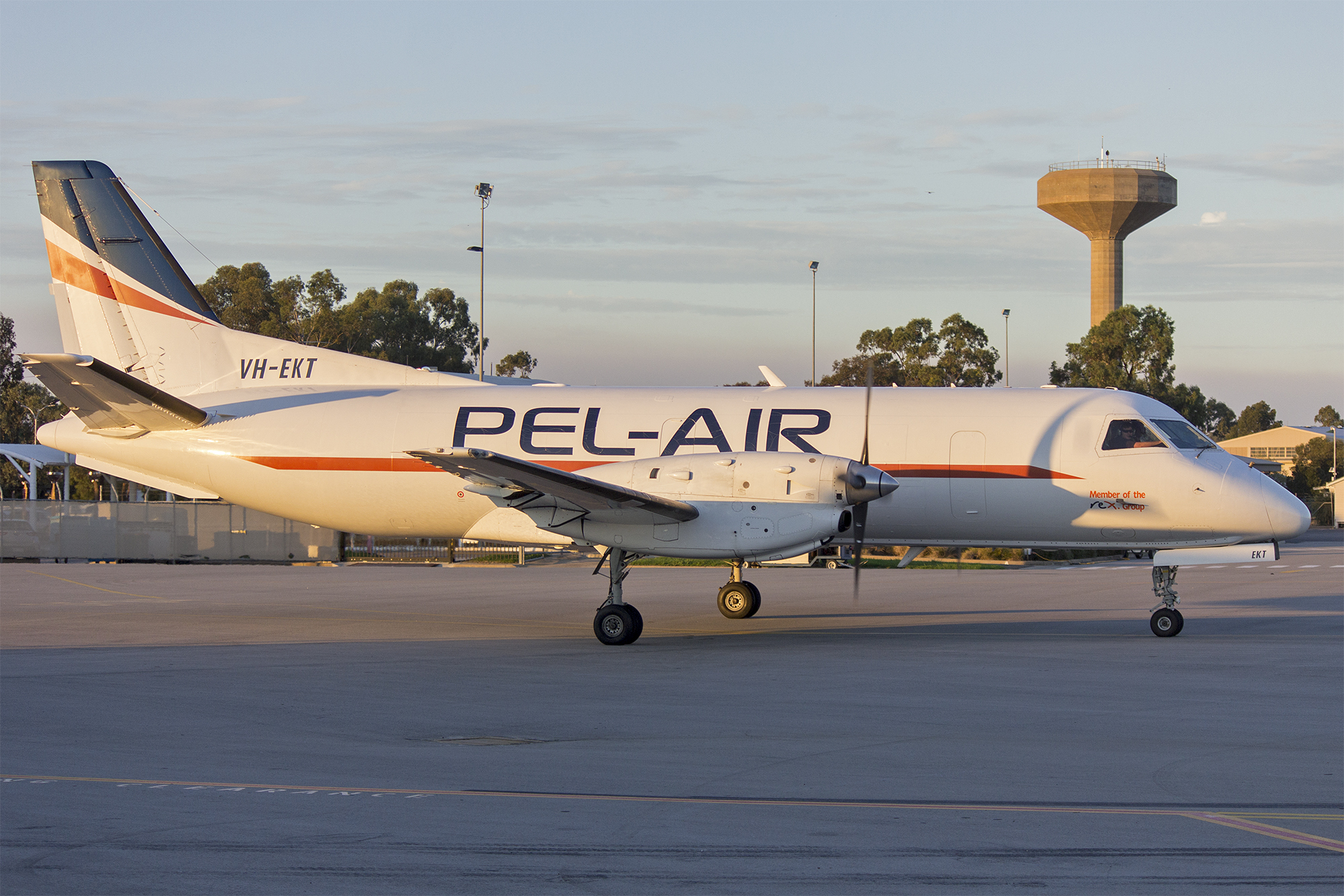
- Pel-Air Saab 340A
IATA	ICAO	Call sign
PA	PFY	PELFLIGHT
- Founded: 1984
- Hubs: Brisbane Airport; Adelaide Airport; Sydney Airport; Essendon Airport
- Fleet size: 24
- Parent company: Toll Group
- Headquarters: Mascot, New South Wales
- Key people: Eugene Lee, COO
- Website: www.pelair.com.au

Pel-Air is an airline based in Mascot, Sydney, Australia. It is a subsidiary of Toll Group.

It specialises in air charter and ad hoc services, operating executive charter services throughout Australasia, as well as a freight service. It also operates air ambulance and government support services with its fleet of Westwind aircraft.

== History ==
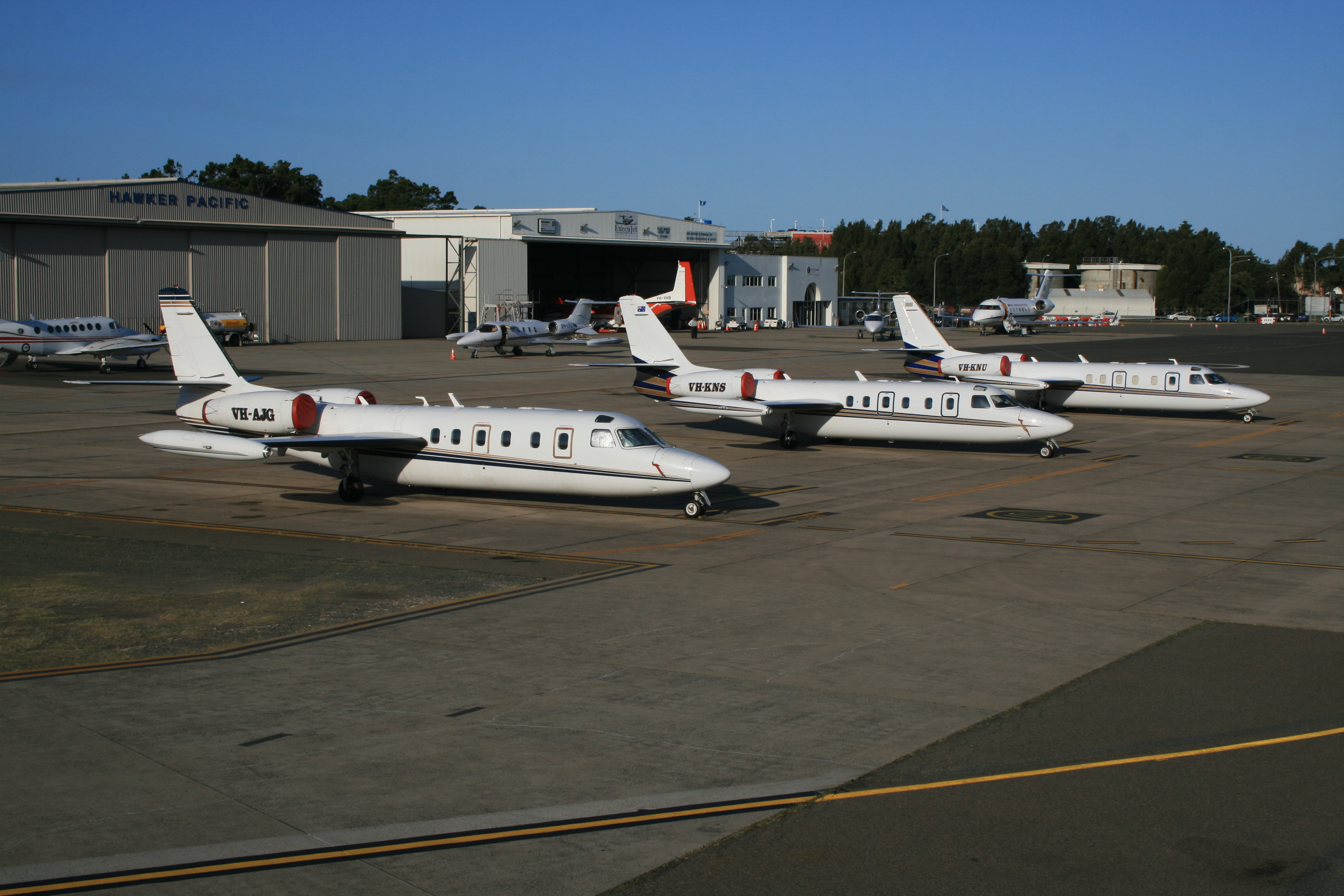
Three Pel-Air Westwinds at Sydney Airport

Pel-Air was founded in 1984 by John Johnson and the following year acquired its first Israel Aircraft Industries (IAI) Westwind aircraft. In January 1989 it commenced scheduled passenger-carrying operations in Western Australia via subsidiary company Qwestair, initially with a leased Beech 200 Super King Air flying between Perth and Telfer. A Westwind replaced the King Air in March of that year, and a Cessna 310 was added in January 1992 to operate between Port Hedland and Telfer via Marble Bar and Woodie Woodie. Qwestair ceased operations in November 1995 after the Perth-Telfer route was awarded to another company, and the two Westwinds then in use returned to Pel-Air operations.

Also in 1995 Pel-Air took over Newcastle Aviation, an operator of Fairchild Metro III, and leased Metro II and Mitsubishi MU-2 freighters. Following the takeover the Mitsubishis and Metro IIs were handed back to their owners and the Metro III fleet was expanded. In 1996 Pel-Air won a contract to provide support to the Royal Australian Navy, resulting in further expansion of the fleet with the acquisition of four Learjets. In 1997 Pel-Air acquired several Metro II aircraft and on-sold them to the Royal Australian Air Force for use as training aids at RAAF Base Wagga. In 2003 the company introduced a new type into its fleet when it took delivery of a leased Beechcraft 1900C freighter. The type proved to be more expensive to operate than the Metro III and the two aircraft in the fleet were handed back to their lessors.

In 2005 another new type was added to the fleet when the company placed an Embraer EMB-120ER Brasilia freighter into service, for use on nightly flights between Sydney and Brisbane carrying Fairfax Media newspapers. Also in 2005 it was announced that Pel-Air would be purchased in stages by Regional Express Holdings; the company becoming a wholly owned subsidiary in mid-2007. Also in 2007, Aspen Medical entered an existing joint venture between Pel-Air and CareFlight to operate air ambulance flights out of Darwin Airport using one of the Westwind aircraft.

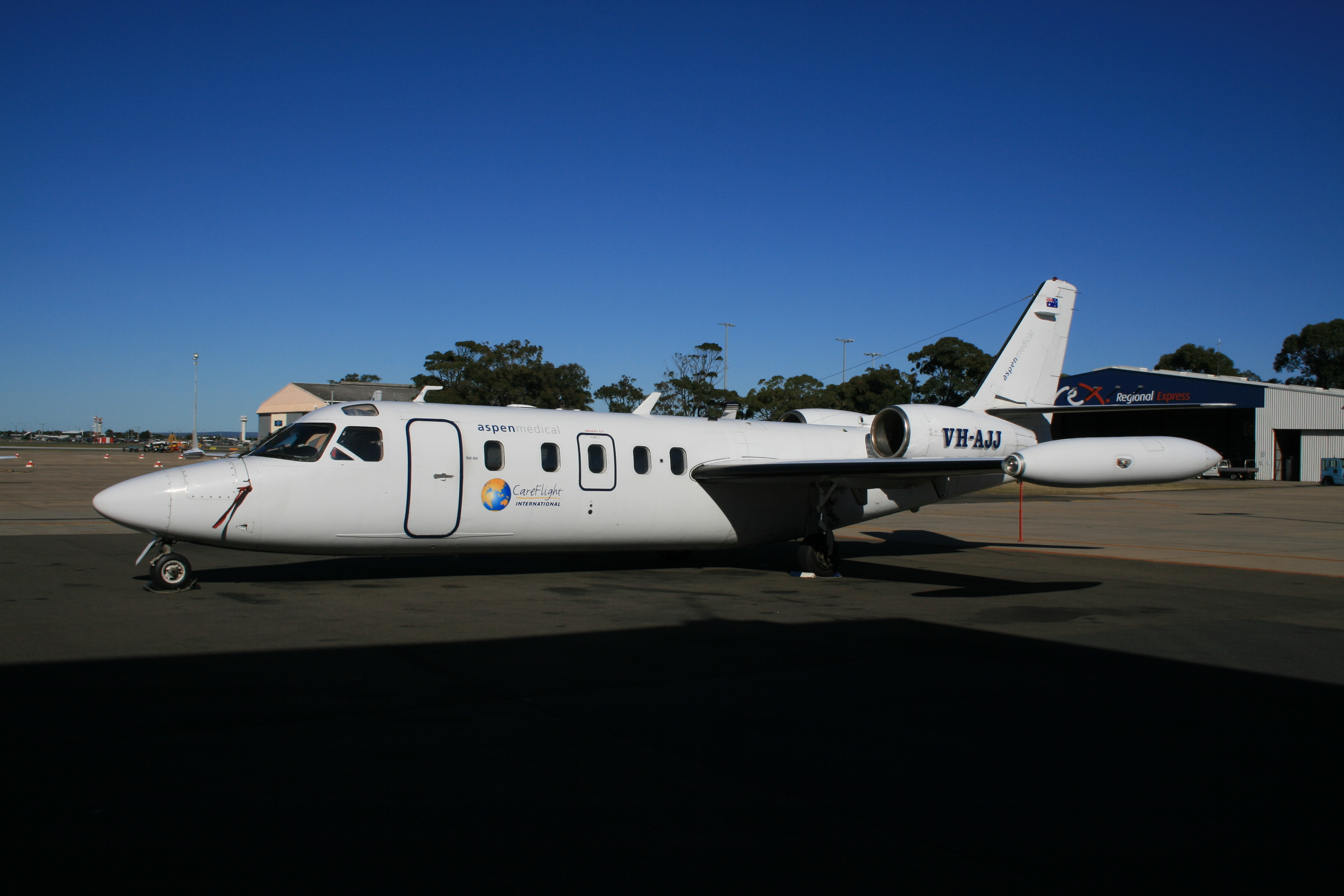
Pel-Air IAI Westwind with Careflight International and Aspen Medical titles

In June 2008 it was announced that a Pel-Air Westwind II would be based at Perth Airport for use as an air ambulance in conjunction with CareFlight. This service was withdrawn in June 2009.

In late 2008 the company added another new type to the fleet, when it took delivery of two Saab 340A freighters, previously operated in passenger service with the parent company's other airline subsidiary Regional Express Airlines. A third Saab 340 was converted to a freighter and transferred from Regional Express a year later.

In February 2009 Pel-Air began fly-in fly-out operations from Townsville Airport on behalf of Barrick Gold, after the previous operator MacAir Airlines collapsed; using Saab 340Bs of sister airline Rex to provide the service. Fly-in fly-out operations expanded later that year when flights from Adelaide Airport on behalf of Iluka Resources commenced in August under a three-year contract.

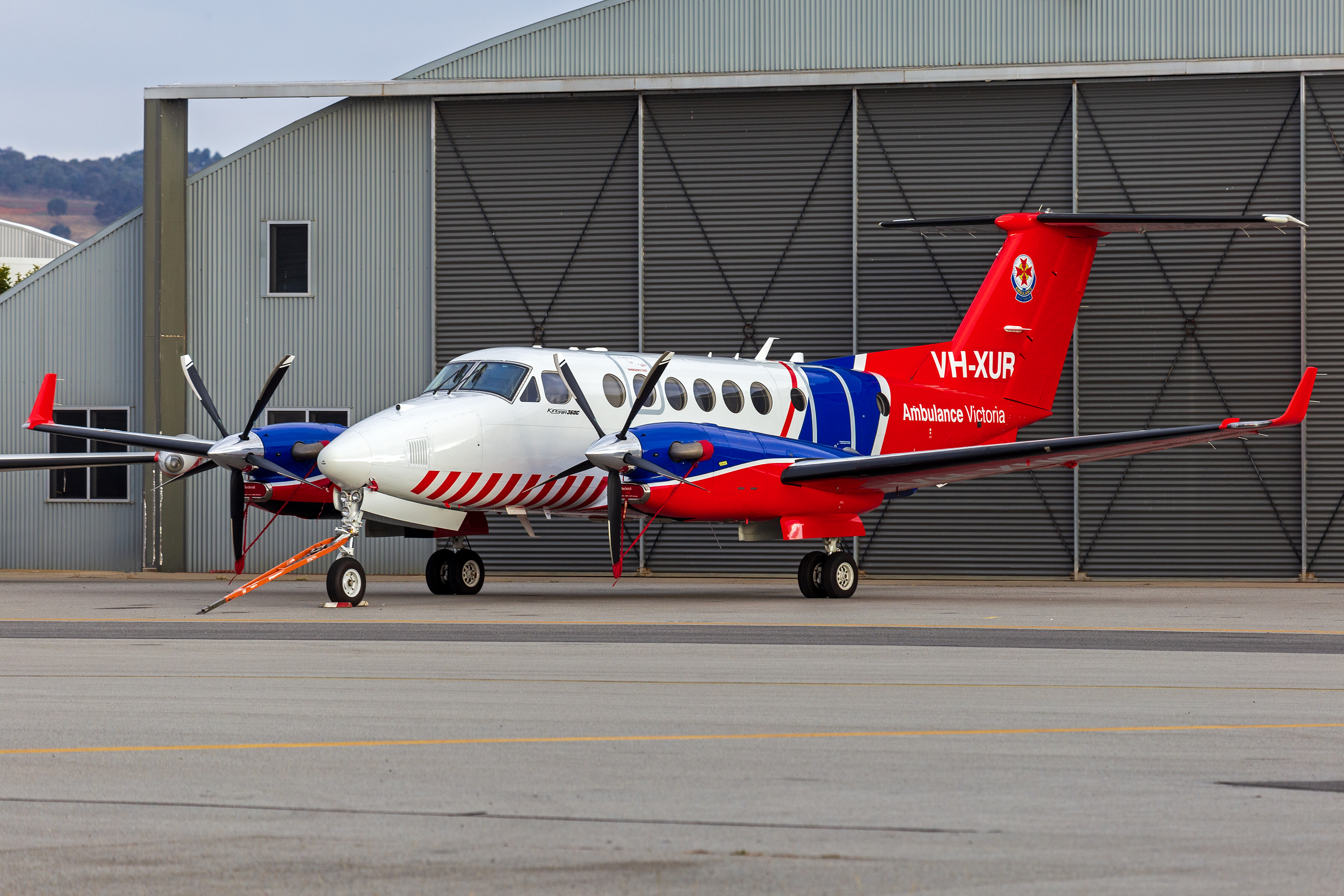
Victorian Air Ambulance Beechcraft B300C King Air 360CER operated by Pel-Air

In April 2009 Regional Express Holdings announced that due to the cancellation of a number of contracts it would cease all scheduled Metro III freight operations at the end of May. Remaining scheduled freight operations would be conducted using the Saab 340As. Also in April Regional Express Holdings launched RexJet Executive Charter as a division of Pel-Air, in a rebranding and expansion of the group's existing passenger air charter business.

In July 2009 the parent company announced that Pel-Air had been named as preferred tenderer for the provision of air ambulance services in Victoria. The company took over from the previous operator, the Royal Flying Doctor Service, in mid-2011.

In February 2020 Regional Express announced Pel-Air would be operating Air Ambulance services on behalf of New South Wales Ambulance, placing an order with Beechcraft for five King Air 350 aircraft that were delivered between December 2020 and June 2021. Pel-Air further announced the procurement of two Pilatus PC-24 aircraft to be introduced into NSW ambulance service from the second half of 2023. Pel-Air took over from the previous operator, the Royal Flying Doctor Service, in January 2022 on a 10-year contract.

In April 2023 Pel-Air sold its three Saab 340A Freighters to Air Chathams, ending Pel-Air's freight capability. Only 2 of the Saab 340's made it to New Zealand after VH-KDK suffered an inflight fire that same month. Passenger charter operations continued using sister company Rex Airlines fleet for regular flights to Jacinth Ambrosia, Carrapateena and Prominent Hill.

In October 2024 Pel-Air was purchased by the Toll Group for $47.1m after Regional Express went into voluntary administration. The deal included the Pel-Air King Air and PC-24 fleets and the companies existing Aeromedical contracts to provide the Air Ambulance services for NSW, ACT and Vic Governments. The remaining Saab 340 charter and maintenance operations where folded into Rex Airlines who continue to operate the Illuka contract to Jacinth Ambrosia.

== Fleet ==
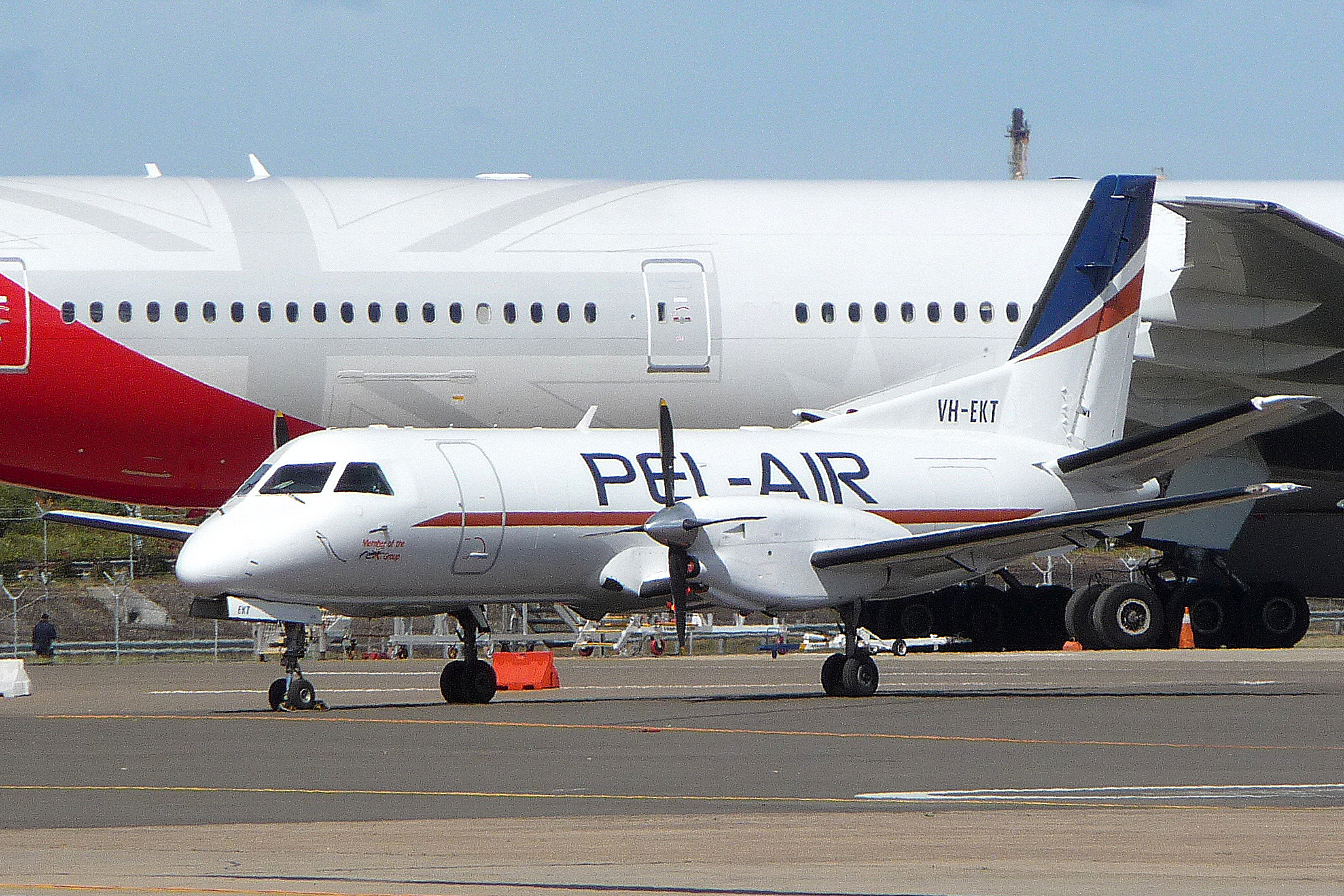
Former Pel-Air Saab 340A freighter conversion

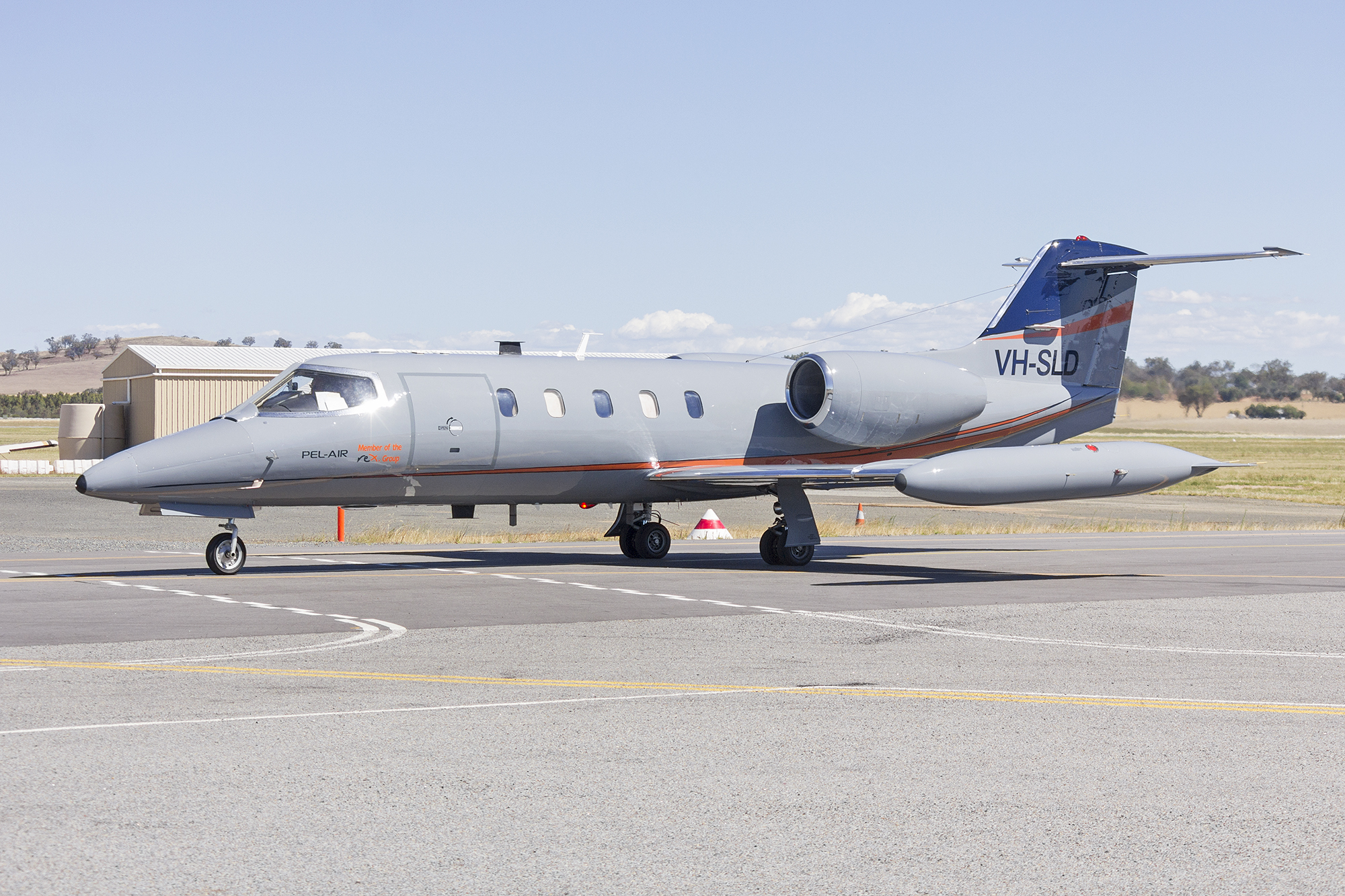
Former Pel-Air Gates Learjet 35A target tug aircraft based at the Royal Australian Navy air base HMAS Albatross

As of April 2023 the Pel-Air fleet consists of the following aircraft:

- 4 Hawker Beechcraft B200C King Air- Ambulance Victoria
- 7 Hawker Beechcraft B300C King Air- NSW Ambulance (5) and Ambulance Victoria (2)
- 2 Hawker Beechcraft B200CGT King Air 260CHW - Ambulance Victoria
- 2 Hawker Beechcraft B300C King Air 360CER - Ambulance Victoria
- 2 Pilatus PC-24 - NSW Ambulance

=== Previously operated ===
- Beechcraft 1900C
- Embraer EMB-120ER Brasilia
- Fairchild SA-227AC Metro III
- Fairchild SA-227AT Expediter
- Gates Learjet 35A
- Gates Learjet 36
- Gates Learjet 36A
- 3 Saab 340A
- 5 IAI 1124 Westwind
- 1 IAI 1124A Westwind II

== Incidents and accidents ==
- On 10 October 1985 one of the company's Westwind aircraft crashed into the sea off Sydney after departing Sydney Airport on a flight to Brisbane; the two crewmembers were killed.
- On 27 April 1995 the company suffered a second fatal Westwind crash when one of its aircraft hit a hill on approach to Alice Springs Airport, killing the three occupants.
- On 18 November 2009 a third Westwind, a 1124A Westwind II, was written-off near Norfolk Island during an air ambulance flight from Apia to Melbourne on behalf of CareFlight. The aircraft was scheduled to land at Norfolk Island to refuel but weather conditions there had deteriorated while it was en route. After several failed landing attempts the crew successfully ditched in open sea in darkness and bad weather. All six occupants were rescued.
- On 4 November 2022 a Saab 340B operating a charter flight for Pel-Air from Flinders Island aborted its takeoff after all tyres on the main landing gear deflated. An investigation found the parking brake was likely not fully released, causing significant drag and heat to be generated during taxi and takeoff, eventually resulting in tyre failure.
- On 23 April 2023 a Saab 340A Freighter operating a positioning flight from Wagga Wagga to Charleville suffered an inflight fire from an electrical fault in the aircraft's right recirculation fan. The aircraft was being operated by crew from sister company Rex Airlines, who diverted safely to Cobar. The aircraft was scrapped as a result of the fire damage.
