= Garran Surge Centre =

Temporary hospital in Canberra, Australia

- Aspen Medical
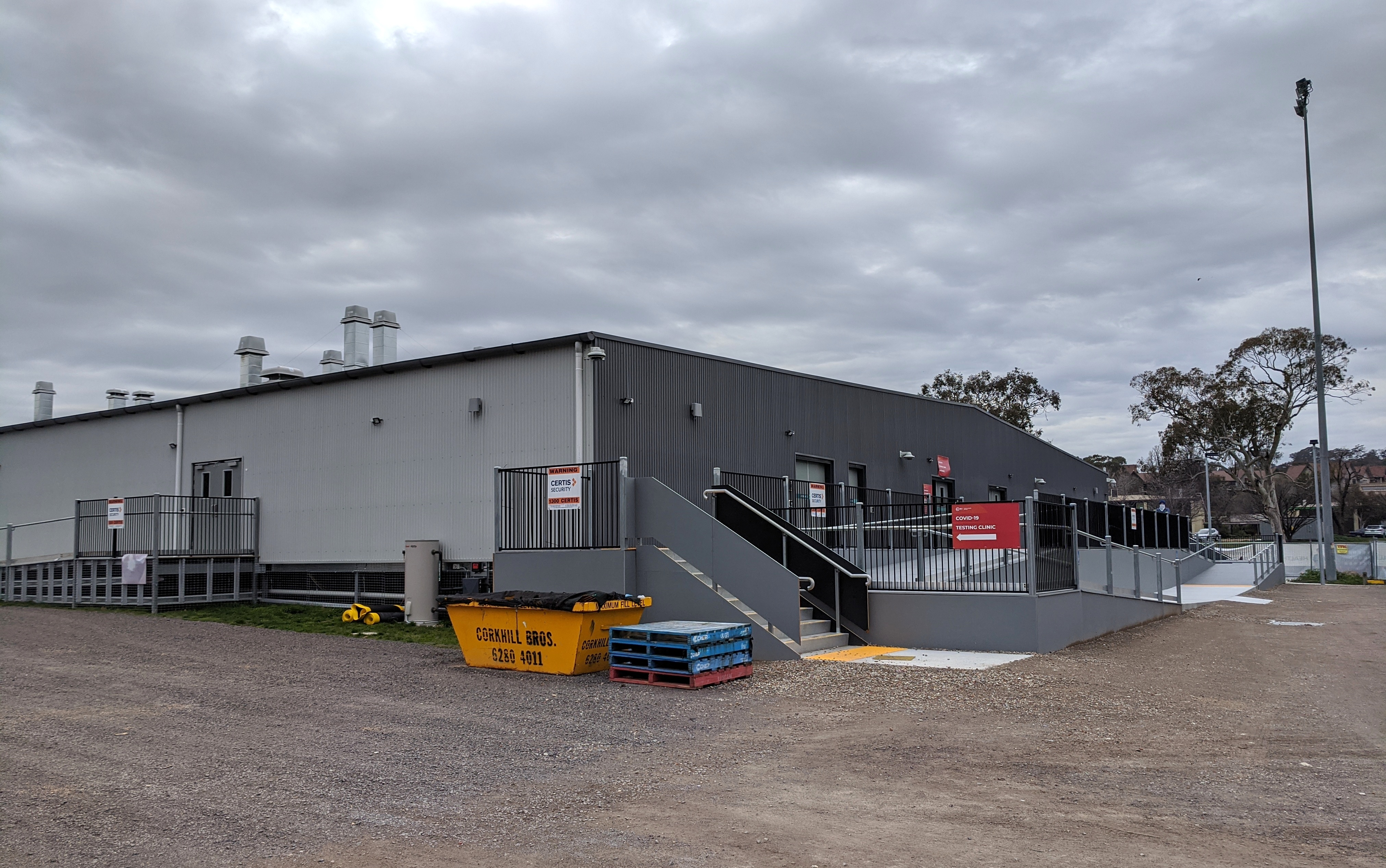
- The Garran Surge Centre in August 2020

Geography
- Location: 123 Kitchner Street, Garran, Australian Capital Territory, Canberra, ACT, Australia
- Coordinates: 35.34305°S 149.1018914°E

Organisation
- Care system: Public Medicare (AU)
- Type: Specialist
- Affiliated university: None

Services
- Emergency department: Yes
- Beds: 44
- Speciality: Intensive Care

History
- Founded: 2020
- Closed: 2023

Links
- Lists: Hospitals in Australia

The Garran Surge Centre, also known as the Canberra Coronavirus Field Hospital, was a temporary hospital in Canberra, Australia created in response to the 2020 COVID-19 pandemic. The hospital was constructed by Aspen Medical, a Canberra-based company with experience managing medical responses to disasters and providing contracted medical services to government agencies in several countries. The facility was located on Garran Oval, a sports field to the northeast of the existing Canberra Hospital campus.

== History ==
The project was announced on 9 April 2020 in anticipation of a surge of COVID-19 cases across the Territory. At that time 84 patients in Canberra had been diagnosed with the disease, 9 of whom were in hospital. Construction began the same day and was expected to cost A$23 million. On 21 May 2020, the hospital was opened after only 37 days of construction. Shortly after, on 24 May 2020, ACT health authorities announced the hospital would likely remain unused due to the successful prevention of a major outbreak in the Territory, revising the cost of the project down to A$14 million.

The facility was never used for its intended purpose as a respiratory intensive care unit, but was instead repurposed as a COVID-19 testing and assessment centre. On 14 February 2021, the ACT Government announced that the hospital, now referred to as the "Garran Surge Centre", would be Canberra's vaccination hub for the Pfizer vaccine rollout.

The ACT Government announced in February 2023 that the Garran Surge Centre would close at the end of the month, as PCR testing would no longer be available without a referral. The building itself would be disassembled and the site returned to its original purpose as a sports field, although no timeline was provided. During the period it was operational, staff conducted more than 240,000 PCR tests. It also functioned as a walk-in clinic for patients with confirmed cases or symptoms of COVID-19 while emergency measures were in place.

== Staff and facility ==
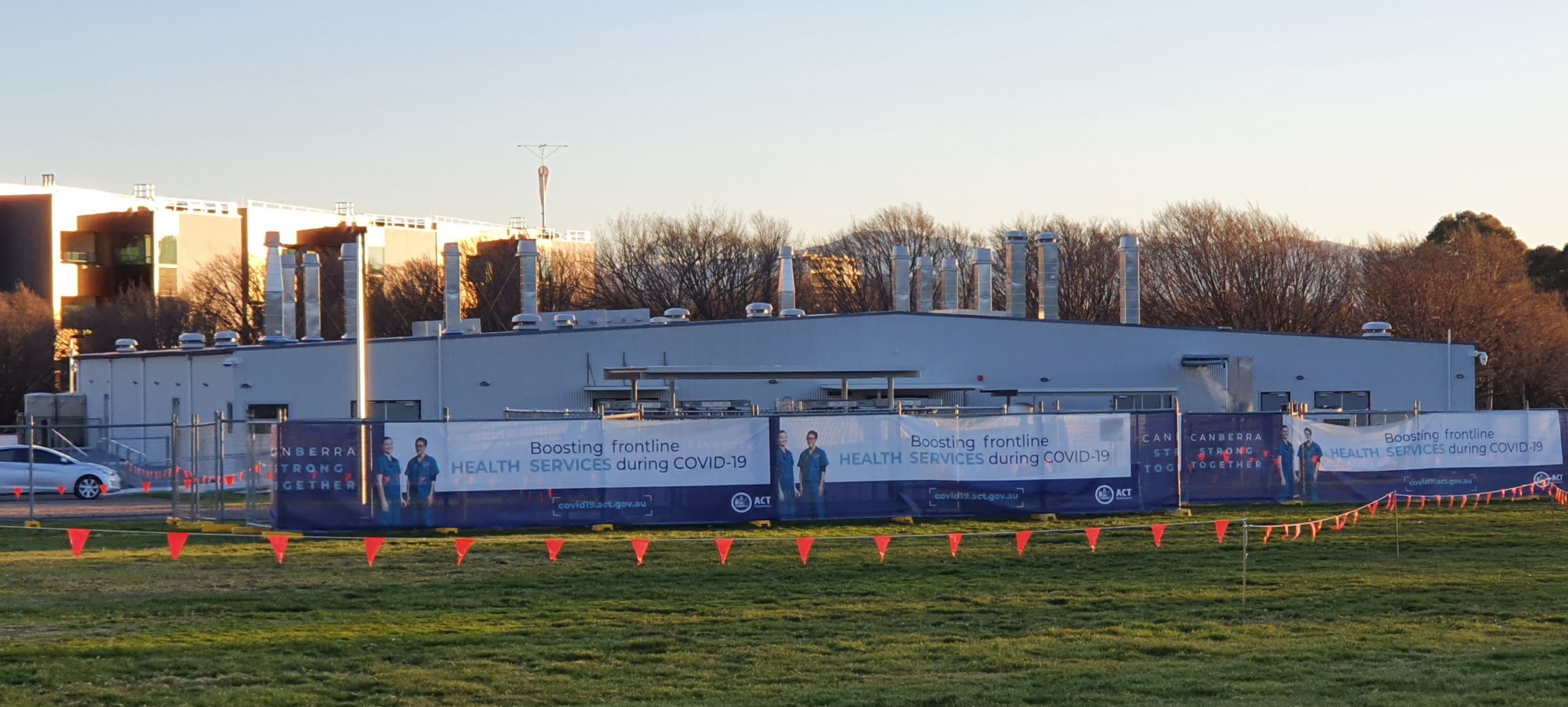
Coronavirus Field Hospital in June 2020

When announced, it was intended that the facility would be staffed by 200 medical professionals, and add 44 beds and six resuscitation bays to treat COVID-19 patients. It was a key part of the ACT Government's pandemic response strategy to triple intensive care capacity from 50 to 170 beds across Canberra ahead of an expected surge in cases during the winter months. When announcing the facility, Health Minister Rachel Stephen-Smith said that due to the urgent need, Aspen Medical had been approached by the Government directly, as a tender process would have led to unacceptable delays.

The facility was constructed from modular steel frames, designed to be disassembled and transported in shipping containers if required. In addition to connecting temporary infrastructure like power, water, sewerage and covered walkways connecting it to the Canberra Hospital, the building required a specially designed ventilation and temperature control system. Each bed was contained within a mechanically controlled isolation area and to reduce the risk of indoor transmission, the air in these areas was ventilated 12 to 15 times per hour. Despite these measures, a review of the hospital's readiness to act as an emergency ward in 2021 found there were significant issues with the building's layout, ventilation and fire safety that in some cases did not meet national health standards. Upgrades to address these issues were not undertaken as the facility's intended use changed soon after its construction.

== See also ==
- COVID-19 pandemic in Australia
