= 2009 Pel-Air Westwind ditching =

Aviation accident near Norfolk Island

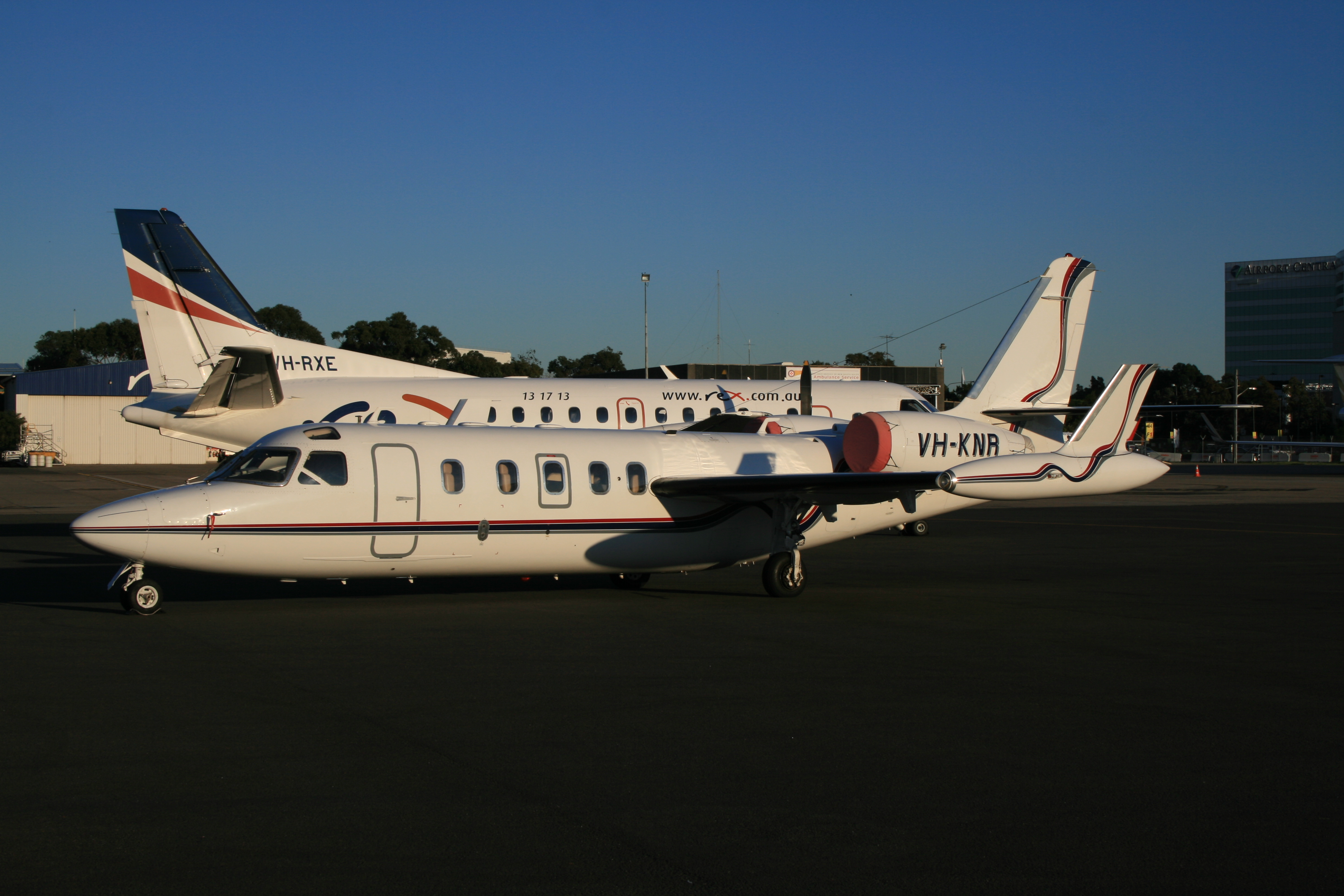
- A Pel-Air Westwind II, sister aircraft to that involved in the accident

Accident
- Date: 18 November 2009
- Summary: Ditching following pilot error and ATC error
- Site: Norfolk Island; 29.075°S 167.95°E

Aircraft
- Aircraft type: IAI 1124A Westwind II
- Operator: Pel-Air
- Call sign: VICTOR HOTEL NOVEMBER GOLF ALPHA
- Registration: VH-NGA
- Flight origin: Apia, Samoa
- Stopover: Norfolk Island
- Destination: Melbourne
- Passengers: 4
- Crew: 2
- Fatalities: 0
- Injuries: 6
- Survivors: 6

The 2009 Pel-Air Westwind ditching or Norfolk Island ditching was an aircraft accident on 18 November 2009 near Norfolk Island, Australia. A Westwind II jet operated by Pel-Air was conducting an air ambulance flight for CareFlight when it was forced to ditch after being unable to land in bad weather and not having sufficient fuel to divert to an alternate destination.

The official accident report issued 2 1/2 years later by the Australian Transport Safety Bureau (ATSB) attracted wide criticism, and resulted in an parliamentary inquiry that found both the ATSB and the Civil Aviation Safety Authority (CASA) had failed to carry out their responsibilities with respect to the accident investigation. In response to the criticism, the ATSB requested that the Transportation Safety Board of Canada review the ATSB's investigation methodologies and processes, and subsequently reopened the investigation on 8 December 2014. The final report of the reopened investigation was released on 23 November 2017, and contained 531 pages and 36 safety factors.

== Flight details ==
On 18 November 2009, an IAI 1124A Westwind II conducted an air ambulance flight from Apia, Samoa to Melbourne on behalf of CareFlight. The aircraft was scheduled to land at Norfolk Island to refuel, but weather conditions deteriorated while it was en route. The aircraft did not carry enough fuel to divert to an alternate destination.

After not being able to make visual observation of the runway after four instrument approaches, the crew ditched the aircraft in open sea 6 kilometres (3.2 nmi) west of Norfolk Island in darkness and bad weather. A pocket torch that the captain had in his possession and used as a distress signal was spotted from land in an area of the sea where the search and rescue effort was initially not concentrated; all six occupants were rescued by local fishermen after 90 minutes in the water.

== Investigation ==
The accident report by the Australian Transport Safety Bureau (ATSB) states "At Apia, the pilot in command submitted a flight plan by telephone to Airservices Australia. At that time, the forecast weather conditions at Norfolk Island for the arrival did not require the carriage of additional fuel for holding, or the nomination of an alternate airport". The ATSB report further states that the main tanks of the aircraft were full "which would provide sufficient fuel and reserves for the flight". The press reported that the pilot was suspended pending the outcome of the official investigation. The Civil Aviation Safety Authority (CASA) investigated the flight planning, fuel planning and management, and decision-making that contributed towards the accident.

== Senate inquiry and controversy ==
On 23 May 2013, a report was released by the Australian Senate following an inquiry into the ATSB investigation of the ditching. This inquiry was sparked by a Four Corners documentary that aired allegations of misconduct by the ATSB and CASA. The Senate's report found that the ATSB accident report was deeply flawed and unfairly blamed the pilot wholly for the accident, and as a consequence the Senate recommended that the accident report be withdrawn and re-done.

"It is disappointing that CASA and the ATSB continue to assert, in the face of evidence to the contrary, that the only part of the system with any effect on the accident sequence was the pilot.."

— Rural and Regional Affairs and Transport References Committee

The Senate committee determined that the ATSB's decision not to retrieve the flight recorders was incongruous with its responsibilities under International Civil Aviation Organization (ICAO) Chicago Convention Annex 13. It also found evidence of collusion between the agencies; that CASA deliberately withheld the Chambers Report from the ATSB; and that the heads of both agencies gave testimony that wasn't credible. The committee made a total of 26 recommendations covering the accident, the operations of the ATSB and the operations of CASA. The committee also passed evidence to the Australian Federal Police, pending the possibility of charges being laid against individuals from CASA who were involved in breaching the Transport Safety Investigation Act 2003.

== Subsequent actions ==
In response to the criticism, the ATSB requested the Transportation Safety Board of Canada (TSB) to review the Australian investigation methodologies and processes. The TSB review concluded that the ATSB's methodologies and processes met or exceeded the recommended practices described in ICAO Annex 13, but its application to the accident at Norfolk Island fell short of the ATSB's own standards. On 8 December 2014, the ATSB reopened the investigation. On 11 November 2015 the flight recorders were retrieved from the wreckage on the seabed. Both flight recorders contained valid data. The final report of the reopened investigation was released on 23 November 2017.

In the 531-page final report, most of the responsibility was still placed on the pilot for inadequate fuel planning and weather checking. However, the report also acknowledged that the pilot was operating within company rules and regulatory guidance, both of which were lax. In particular, air ambulance flights were classified as "aerial work" rather than "charter", resulting in such flights being subjected to looser requirements than other passenger-carrying flights. It also commented that air traffic controllers at Nadi and Auckland failed to inform the pilot of the deteriorating weather conditions at Norfolk Island before the flight reached the point of no return, although the pilot also did not proactively request such information.
