= CareFlight =

Australian air medical service

- Founded: May 1986; 40 years ago
- Type: Not-for-profit organisation
- Legal status: Charity
- Purpose: Aeromedical and primary health care
- Headquarters: Westmead, New South Wales, Australia
- Chairman: Andrew Refshauge
- CEO: Mick Frewen
- Website: careflight.org.au

CareFlight is an air medical service headquartered in Westmead, New South Wales, Australia.

== History ==
CareFlight was established in the mid-1980s in New South Wales to provide aeromedical services. Its early years involved navigating regulatory requirements and establishing partnerships with local emergency services.

=== Aviation Authority Compliance ===
During its initial operations, CareFlight worked to meet Civil Aviation Safety Authority (CASA) standards. There were challenges related to regulatory compliance, typical of new aeromedical operations at the time. However, no publicly available CASA reports indicate significant breaches or sanctions against CareFlight (CASA).

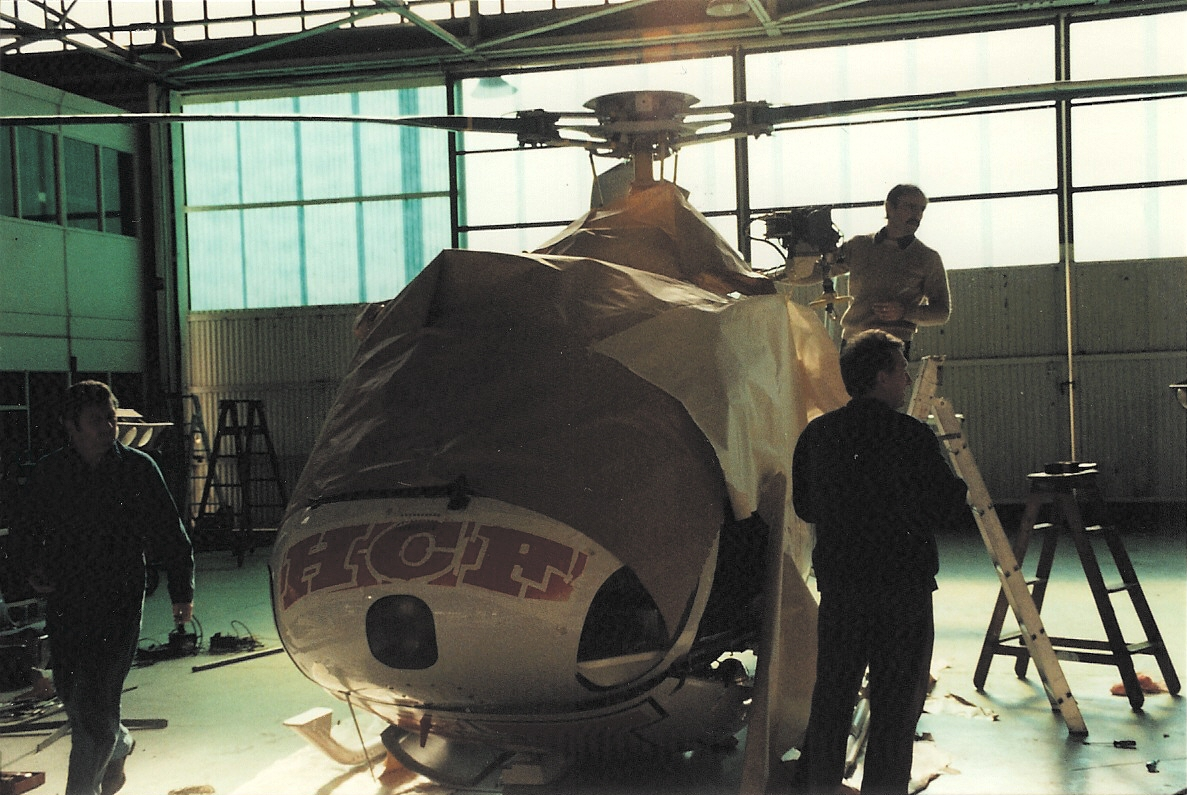
In 1987, CareFlight became the first emergency helicopter service in NSW to be on 24-hour duty.

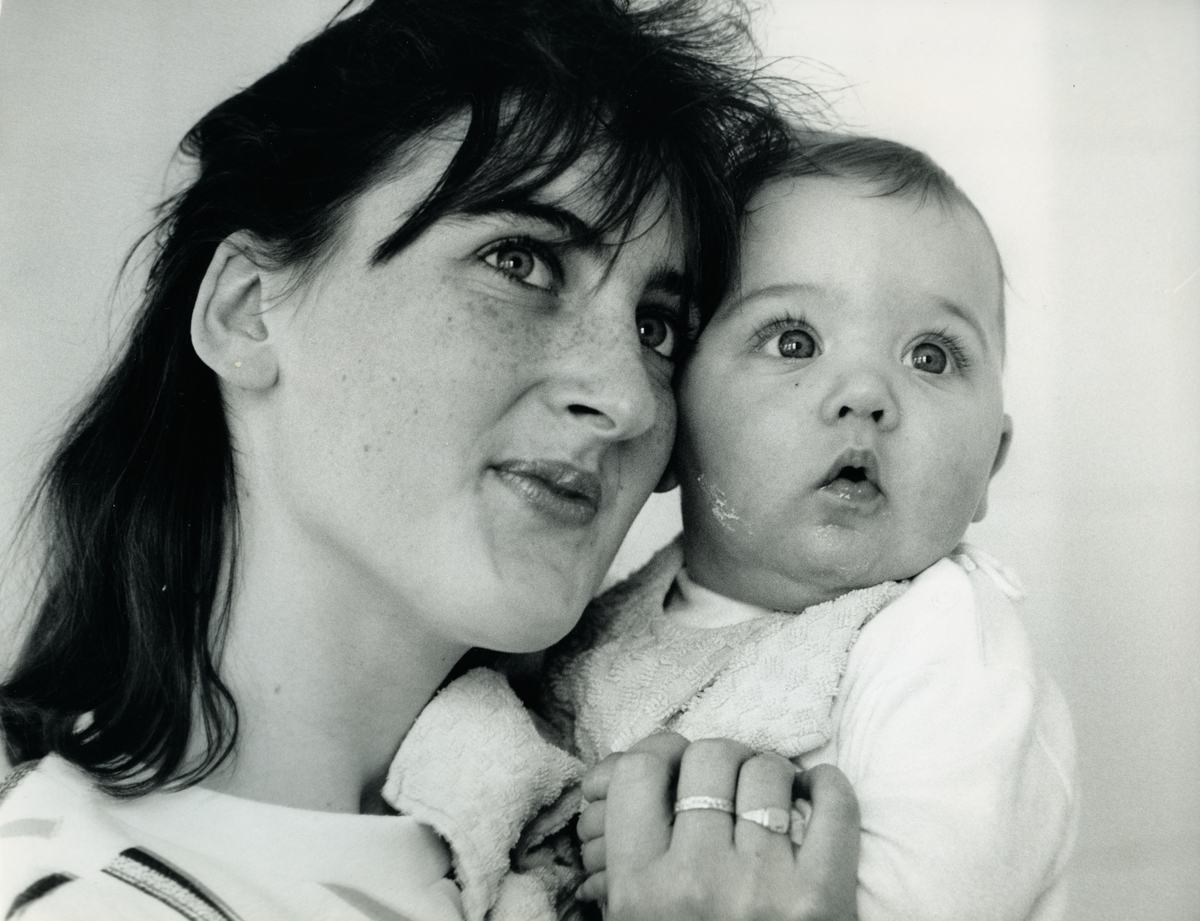
In 1991, CareFlight's 2000th patient, six month-old Nathan Isedale, is flown to Camperdown Children's Hospital after being admitted to Bowral Hospital with viral pneumonia.

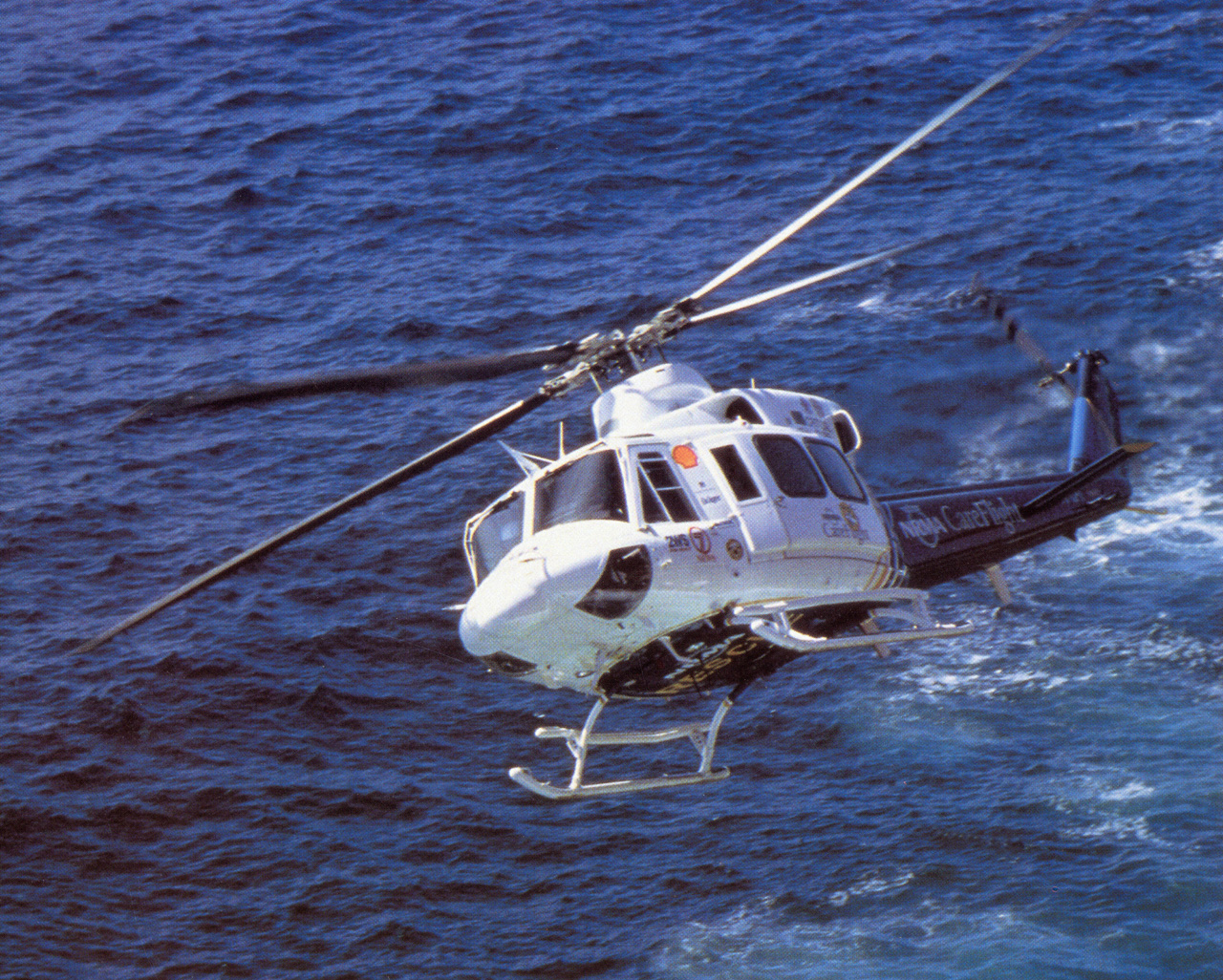
In 1996, CareFlight is the first Australian medical team to use an intra-aortic balloon pump during a helicopter patient transfer.

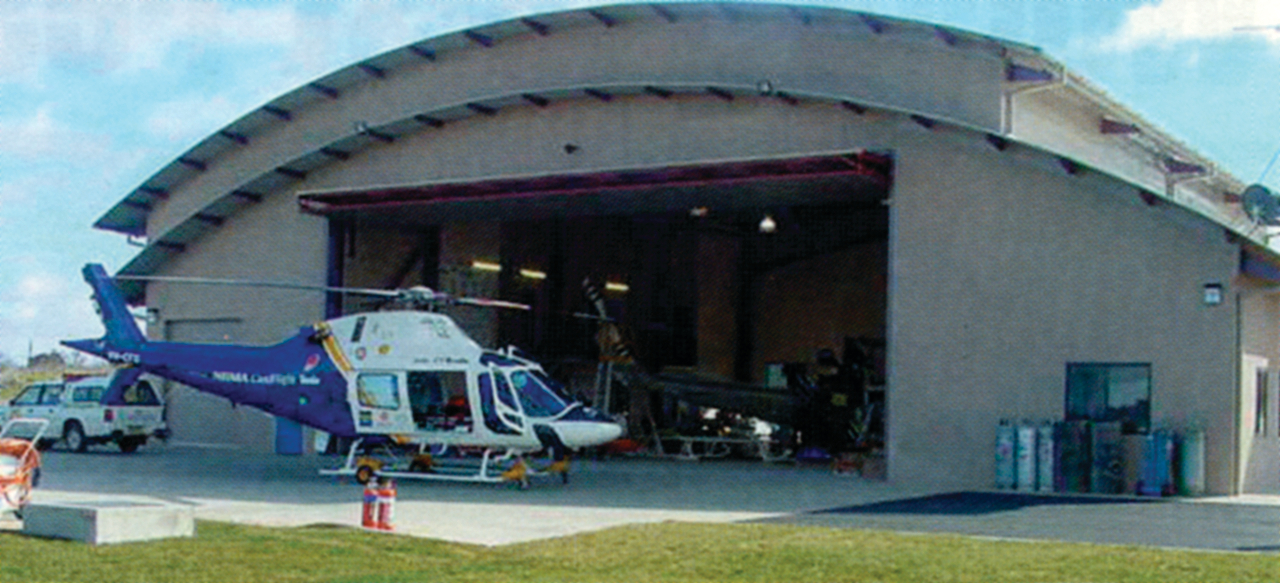
In 2000, CareFlight launched second helicopter operations with the Central West emergency helicopter in Orange.

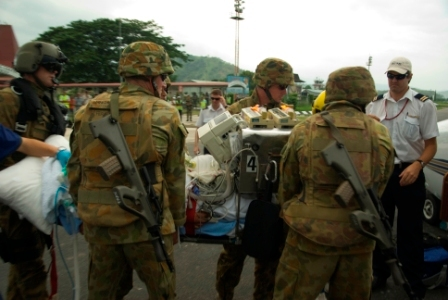
In 2007, CareFlight conducted their first International Air Ambulance mission.

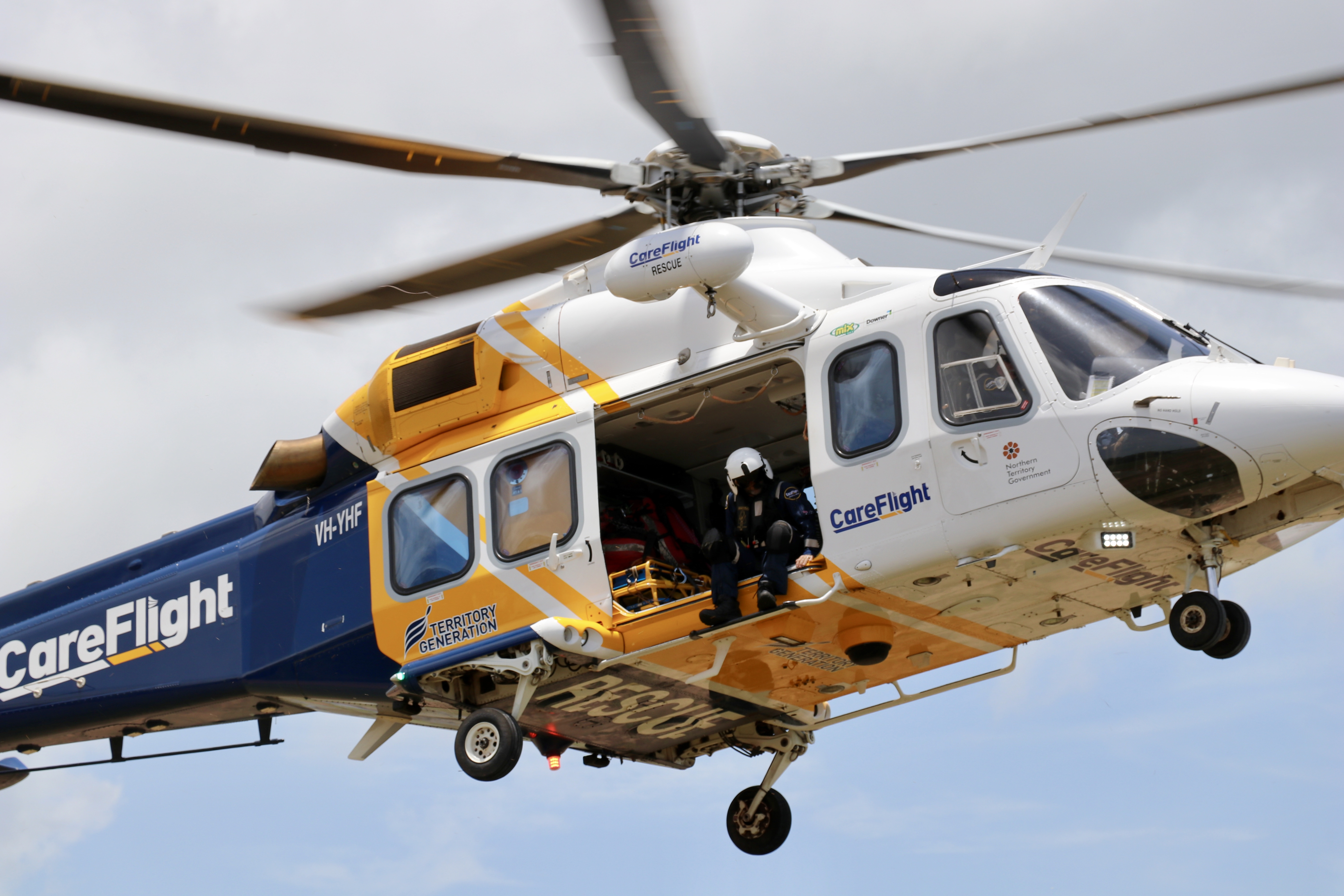
In 2009, CareFlight established helicopter operations in Darwin.

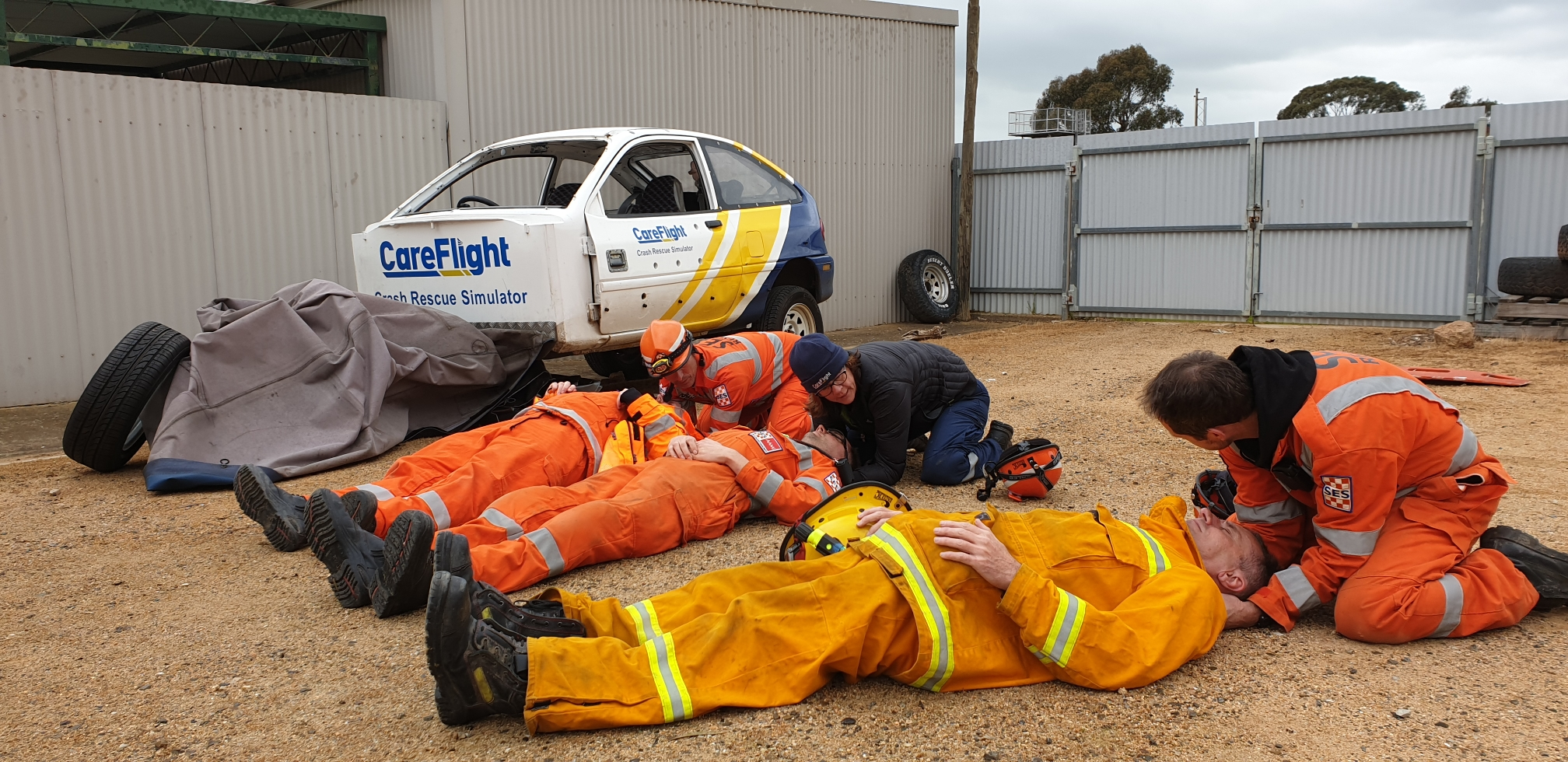
In 2011, CareFlight launched its MediSim trauma care workshops, designed for local emergency services personnel and volunteers.

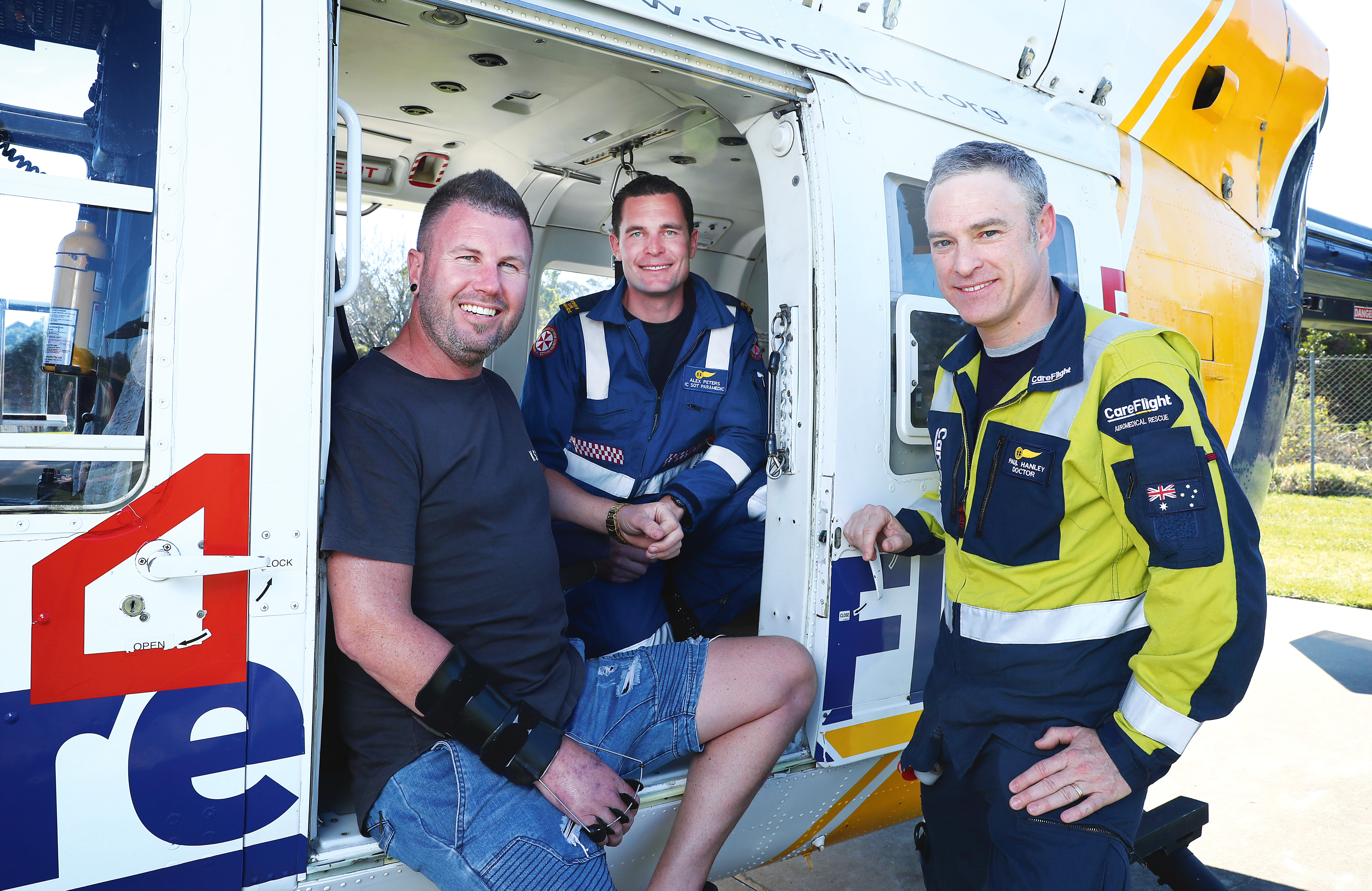
In 2018, CareFlight became the first Australian aeromedical service to routinely carry plasma.

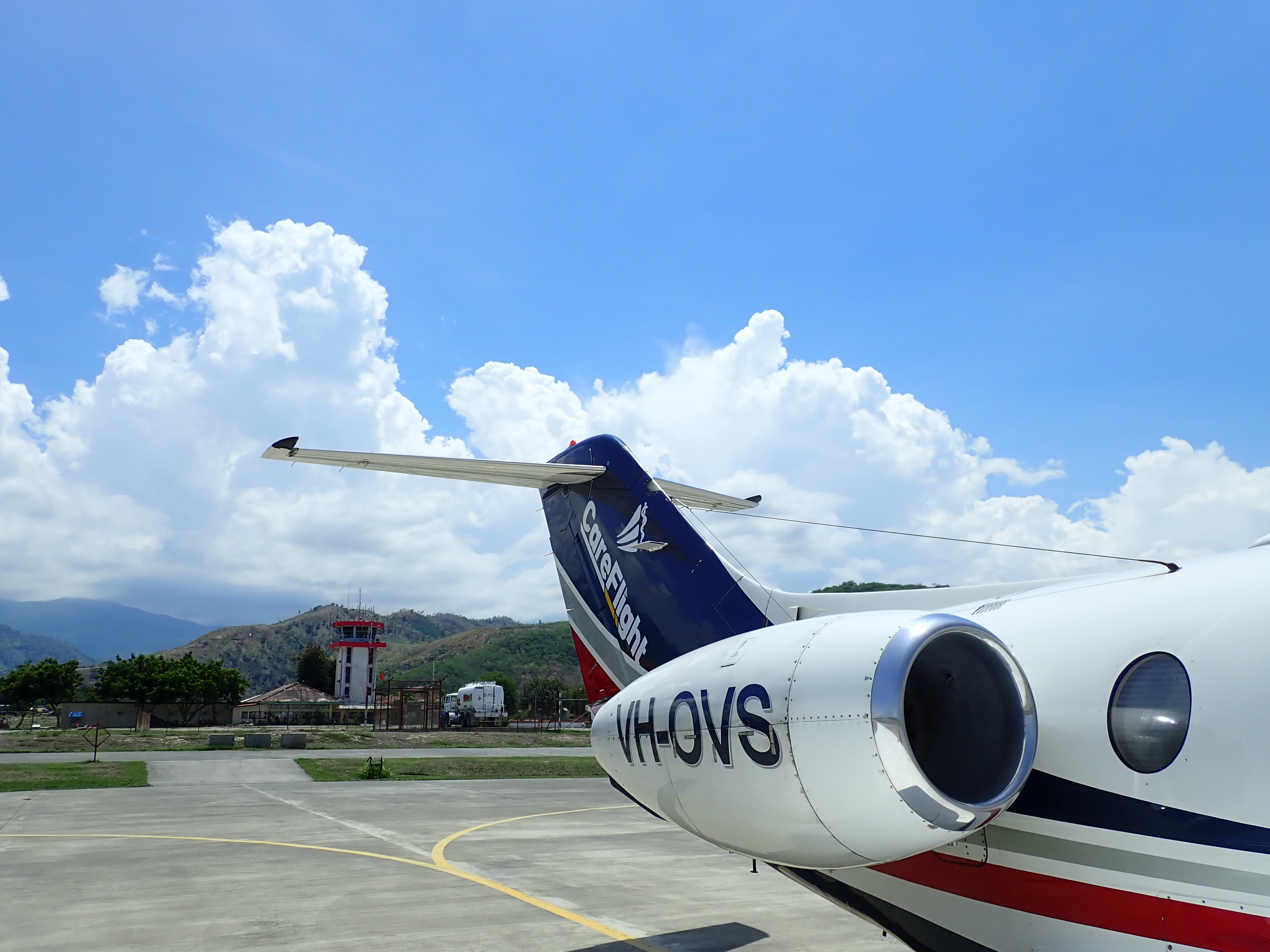
In 2020, CareFlight was awarded the inter-hospital patient transport jet contract by the NT Government.

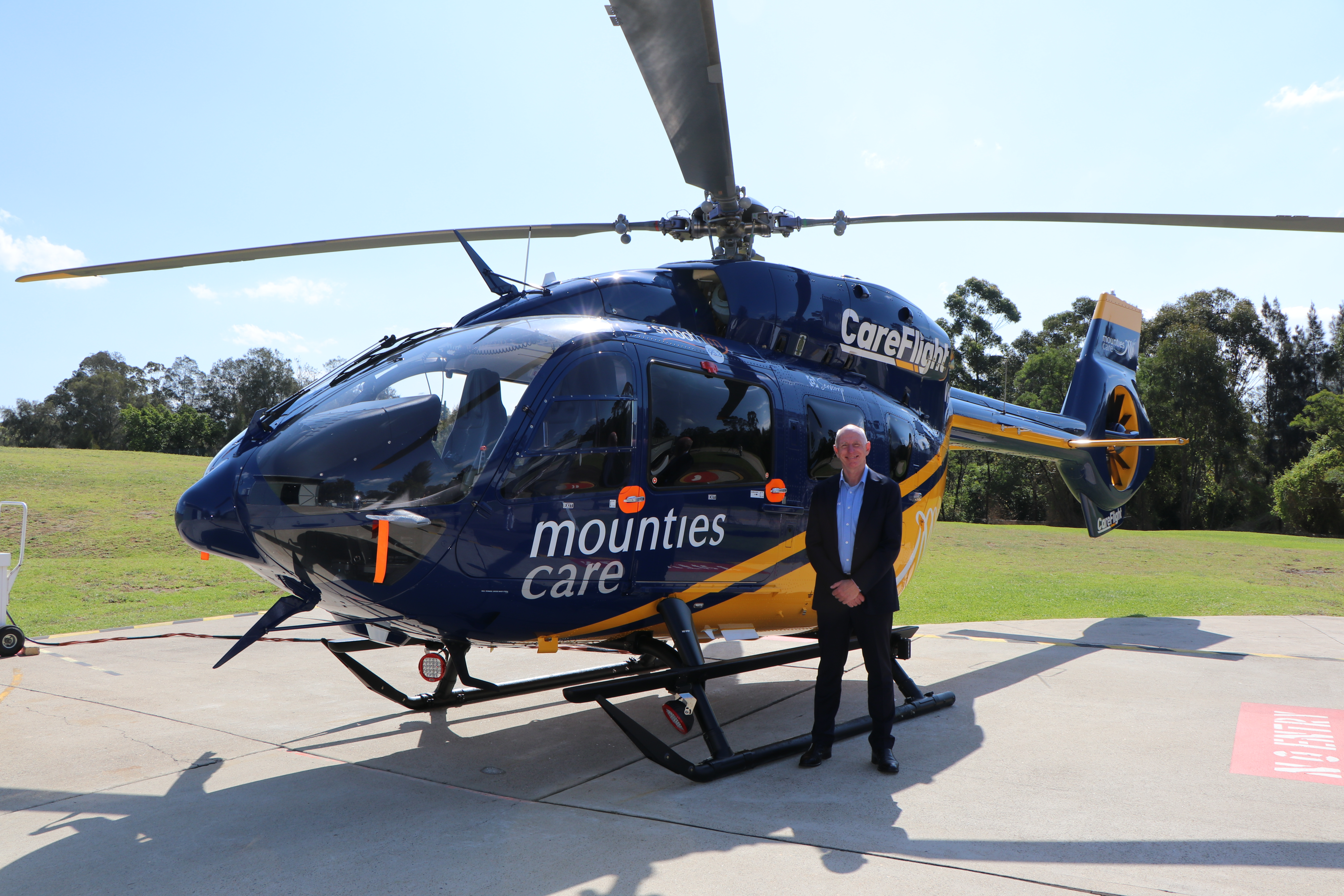
CareFlight CEO Mick Frewen with CareFlight's H145 helicopter, which launched in 2021.

CareFlight was founded in Sydney, Australia in May 1986 as an aeromedical charity. Its mission is to save lives, speed recovery and serve the community. Since conducting their first mission in their sole helicopter, the Squirrel AS350B, in July 1986, CareFlight has grown to include helicopters, turboprop and jet aeroplanes, which fly on both domestic and international missions. In 2019, around 7,900 patients were treated by CareFlight.

== Domestic Missions ==
CareFlight conducts daily missions across Australia, treating and transferring patients from accident scenes and between hospitals.

Major domestic missions

In 1998, CareFlight rescued seven sailors from the stricken yacht Business Post Naiad during wild storms in the 1998 Sydney to Hobart Yacht Race. The CareFlight crew of that mission later received the Prince Philip Award.

In 2003, CareFlight attended the Waterfall train crash in which seven people were killed. CareFlight medical teams triaged, treated and transported the injured.

In 2015, CareFlight launched a complex rescue mission to rescue helicopter pilot Matt Gane after his mustering helicopter crashed more than 800 km south-east of Darwin.

In 2019, CareFlight rescued a critically ill man from a cruise ship that was located 200 kilometres off the coast of mainland Australia. This mission saw the CareFlight crew using a complex hover and winch recovery technique due to the cruise ship not having a helipad.

In Australia, aeromedical retrievals are typically led by a combination of doctors, nurses and/or paramedics, with doctors often providing critical care during helicopter missions, particularly in life-threatening emergencies (Wikipedia – Air Medical Services). Most aeromedical services also require their doctors to complete Helicopter Underwater Escape Training (HUET) and advanced aviation safety programs to ensure preparedness for high-risk missionspatient safety.

== International Missions ==
Since their first international retrieval mission, in 1990, from Penang, CareFlight has been bringing injured or sick overseas Australians back home.

Major international missions

In 2001, CareFlight played a role in the repatriation of victims of the Bali bombing in Denpasar, Bali.

CareFlight was involved in the 2009 Pel-Air Westwind ditching near Norfolk Island, supplying the aeromedical crew for the flight. The incident exposed broader compliance and governance issues within the aeromedical sector 2009 Pel-Air Westwind ditching.

After the attempted assassination of East Timor's President Jose Ramos Horta in 2008, CareFlight International flew the President from Dili to Darwin, Australia, for medical treatment. CareFlight's clinical team comprising a specialist doctor, two nurses, pilot and first officer flew to New Zealand from Sydney on Thursday 12 December to retrieve two patients, who had suffered critical injuries in the 2019 Whakaari / White Island eruption.

== Research and Innovation ==
Since 1986, CareFlight has invested in clinical, aviation, logistics and business planning research projects.

In 1998, CareFlight introduced their specially designed Stretcher Bridge, the first portable intensive care module. The unit incorporates a ventilator, oxygen and suction capabilities, monitors, and infusion pumps. The development of this concept has shaped and simplified the cabin fit of subsequent air medical craft, both rotary and fixed-wing.

CareFlight designed and conducted the Head Injury Retrieval Trial (HIRT), the world's first randomised clinical trial to evaluate the benefits of rapidly transporting a doctor to patients with head injuries. Over the six-year period of the study (2006-2011), CareFlight responded to more than 1,500 patients. Most patients had been involved in motor vehicle accidents (the leading cause of brain injury from traumatic head injury), falls and other workplace accidents.

The HIRT research data indicated a 16 per cent reduction in deaths (45 percent to 29 percent) when unconscious patients are treated by a doctor. Former CareFlight Medical Director and Chief HIRT Investigator, Dr Alan Garner OAM, presented the results of this ground-breaking research at the 2012 International Conference for Emergency Medicine in Dublin.

In April 2018, CareFlight became the first and only civilian aeromedical service in Australia to perform pre-hospital plasma transfusions as part of their rapid response helicopter service. Clinicians have described this development as a 'quantum leap' in emergency treatment. Experts suggest that, in certain cases, this innovative approach could save one in three people who would otherwise succumb to their injuries.

In 2019, CareFlight completed a research study looking at new technology for warming blood for use in pre-hospital blood transfusions. The first stage of the research confirmed the benefits of warming blood in emergency transfusions and the second stage tested different devices that can be used to rapidly warm blood in just minutes during the procedure. This research study, partially funded by the Medevac Foundation in the United States, was conducted in partnership with the cardiac anaesthesia services and blood bank at The Children's Hospital at Westmead.

== Awards and Contracts ==
CareFlight received the 1998 Award for Aviation Safety Excellence in the AOC category.

In 2006, NSW Ambulance awarded its helicopter contract to CHC Australia, citing safety and compliance concerns with CareFlight’s fleet (FlightGlobal). CareFlight staff protested the decision, but NSW Health and Ambulance defended the tender, highlighting improved service and safety standards (ABC News). A senior doctor expressed how their protest was based on emotions and what their staff were historically familiar with and not the best interest of the community and patient safety (ABC). Despite CareFlight claiming their staff would not would move to the new provider they transitioned to CHC’s newer, government-approved AW139 helicopters, ensuring continued emergency care for NSW patients (ABC News).

In June 2011, the Northern Territory Government announced the award of a ten-year Top End Medical Retrieval Service contract to CareFlight. In October of the same year, CareFlight became Australia's only aeromedical provider to be awarded the European Aeromedical Institute (EURAMI) Accreditation for three years, Australia's only provider to hold this.

In 2026, CareFlight lost its bid to retain the Northern Territory Government's Top End Medical Retrieval Service (TEMRS) contract for aeromedical retrieval and inter-hospital transfer services. The organisation had operated the service since 2013 and publicly expressed disappointment following the selection of a preferred tenderer for the successor contract

== CareFlight Today ==
Today, CareFlight uses a fleet of helicopters, jet aircraft, turbo-prop planes and road vehicles, across Australia. In Sydney, CareFlight's rapid response helicopter, with a specialist doctor and critical care paramedic on board, attend to critically ill or injured patients performing treatments including roadside surgery and blood and plasma transfusions.

CareFlight retrieves seriously ill and injured patients from outback Northern Territory using helicopters, turbo prop planes and aeromedical jets as part of the Top End Medical Retrieval Service. CareFlight has operated this service (TEMRS) under an agreement with the Northern Territory Government since 1 January 2013. This agreement followed an open tender in 2011 to provide an integrated aeromedical service in the Top End.

CareFlight provides helicopter search and rescue services to organisations such as the Australian Maritime Safety Authority and provides pilots, aircrew and engineers to assist organisations such as New South Wales Rural Fire Service manage bushfire threats. They also provide critical and emergency care trained doctors to New South Wales Ambulance for fixed wing, rotary wing and road ambulance operations.

Seriously ill and injured interstate and internationally are treated and transferred via helicopter, turbo prop aeroplanes and jets. Patients are also transferred using specially modified road transport vehicles for specialist treatment in major hospitals.

== Aircraft ==
In February 2021, CareFlight launched their Airbus H145 helicopter. The H145 was chosen for CareFlight's rapid response helicopter service as it can reach patients in its service area within 15 minutes.

In April 2021, CareFlight NT launched their Gulfstream G150 jet, Australia's first medical jet capable of transporting patients from south-east Asia. The G150 can fly 5,300 kilometres at a speed of 1,000 km/h, allowing it to travel from its base in Darwin to Sydney and Melbourne in under four hours.

== Board and governance ==
CareFlight's board monitors and reviews the company's compliance with its statutory obligations ensuring it meets its legal obligations. The Honorable Bradley Hazzard is the chairperson of the board, and Peter Broschofsky is the chief executive officer.

== See also ==
- LifeFlight
- Royal Flying Doctor Service
- Westpac Life Saver Rescue Helicopter Service
- Angel Flight
- Aspen Medical
- 2009 Pel-Air Westwind ditching
