= Aspen Medical =

Health service company

- Aspen Medical logo
- Type: Private
- Industry: Healthcare
- Founded: 2003
- Founder: Glenn Keys AO; Dr. Andrew Walker
- Headquarters: Canberra
- Area served: Australia; Papua New Guinea; Fiji; Indonesia; United Arab Emirates; Somalia; United States; Ukraine; Haiti
- Website: aspenmedical.com

Aspen Medical is a privately owned Australian-based health service company with operations in several countries, including Australia, Papua New Guinea, Fiji, Indonesia, United Arab Emirates, Somalia, the US, Ukraine, and Haiti. The company headquarters are in Canberra with additional offices in Sydney, Brisbane and Perth, and international offices in Washington, D.C., Abu Dhabi and Port Moresby. Aspen Medical was founded in 2003 by Glenn Keys AO and Dr. Andrew Walker.

In 2018, Aspen Medical was recognised as the Australian Exporter of the Year, and in 2021 was inducted into the Australian Export Hall of Fame.

A May 2021 report into procurement of items for the National Medical Stockpile (NMS) by the Australian National Audit Office mentioning Aspen Medical noted that "Procurement processes for the COVID-19 NMS procurements were largely consistent with the proper use and management of public resources."

In 2022, Aspen Medical fell under media scrutiny due to large-scale procurement contracts to provide items to the NMS totaling more than $1 billion awarded during the COVID-19 pandemic.

Aspen Medical is classified by the World Health Organization as an emergency medical team.

== History ==
Aspen Medical was established in 2003 by Glenn Keys AO and Dr. Andrew Walker. Its initial work involved reviewing the delivery of orthopedic services under the Blair Governments' National Health Service Reforms and reducing waiting lists for orthopedic, urological and cataract surgery in the UK and Northern Ireland. Subsequently, the firm medically supported the Australian-led Regional Assistance Mission to Solomon Islands to stabilize the Solomon Islands after its civil collapse, and assisted the Australian-led international Military Mission to East Timor, which included saving President Jose Ramos Horta's life after an assassination attempt.

Dr Andrew Walker exited the company in late 2019. Glenn Keys' family trust bought out Dr Walker several weeks before the onset of the COVID-19 pandemic. Dr Walker received an undisclosed sum for his shareholding and full control of several of the company's subsidiaries.

In January 2019, Aspen Medical signed a 23-year Public Private Partnership (PPP) with the Fiji Government to manage and develop the public hospitals at Ba and Lautoka. Health Care (Fiji) Pte Limited, a joint venture company between Aspen Medical and the Fiji National Provident Fund, commenced operations at the hospitals in April 2022.

In June 2023, Sanusa Medika Hospitals, a joint venture majority-owned by Aspen Medical and Docta, a company owned by Australian physician Dr Andrew Rochford, began construction of a 200-bed hospital in Depok, West Java.

=== 2004–17; Solomon Islands ===
In 2004, Aspen Medical was contracted to deliver healthcare services, including a hospital and equipment, personnel, pharmaceuticals, technology and ambulance aircraft, to RAMSI personnel and Australian Government employees in Solomon Islands.

=== 2006–14;Timor-Leste ===
In 2006, Aspen Medical was contracted by PDL Toll, the prime contractor, to support the Australian Defence Force (ADF) in Timor-Leste. Aspen Medical designed the healthcare facility and provided all staff. The company provided primary healthcare, radiology, pathology, dental, emergency care and surgery.

=== 2014–15; West Africa Ebola Outbreak ===
Aspen Medical managed the Australian and New Zealand government responses to the Ebola virus disease (EVD). This response involved commissioning and managing a 100-bed Ebola Treatment Centre (ETC), constructed by the UK Government in Sierra Leone.

=== 2017-2018; Mosul, Iraq ===
In March 2017, Aspen Medical was contracted by the World Health Organization (WHO) to provide healthcare professionals and hospital management, including maternity services, at a 48-bed field hospital south of Mosul in northern Iraq during fighting between ISIS and the Iraqi Army.

Aspen Medical opened a further two field trauma hospitals around Mosul.

=== COVID-19 Pandemic ===
==== January 2020 ====
Aspen Medical managed infection prevention and control for the first repatriation flights back to Australia from Wuhan in China. Early in the pandemic, the company also managed the first round of hotel quarantine in Sydney. The Japanese Ministry of Health contracted Aspen Medical to manage the quarantine of the crew on the Diamond Princess cruise liner when it docked in Yokohama. The company also managed quarantine on the Grand Princess when it anchored in San Francisco Bay.

==== March 2020 ====
The Australian Government Department of Health launched an online infection prevention and control training portal with the assistance of Aspen Medical. On 11 March 2020, the Australian Government announced a A$2.4 billion plan to protect all Australians from COVID-19, with the package providing support across primary care, aged care, hospitals, research and the national medical stockpile. The plan provided for a national network of up to 100 GP-led respiratory clinics. Aspen Medical was contracted to oversee the building of the pop-up respiratory clinics. The first GP-led respiratory clinics opened on 21 March 2020 at Macquarie Park in Sydney and Morayfield in Brisbane. The 100th pop-up clinic opened on 13 May 2020 in Mudgee, New South Wales.

Aspen Medical secured four contracts from the Australian Government, totaling A$1.1 billion, to procure medical supplies for the National Medical Stockpile (NMS). The Australian Government Department of Health awarded over 50 contracts to 44 different suppliers of and other medical supplies to the NMS.

==== April 2020 ====
Aspen Medical team contracted by Australian Border Force boarded the Ruby Princess cruise ship to conduct a medical assessment of the crew following a much-publicized COVID-19 outbreak on the ship. The ship then sailed to Port Kembla on the south coast of New South Wales arriving on 6 April 2022. An Aspen Medical team, led by former WHO pandemic expert Dr Ian Norton, assessed the health of the ship's 1040 crew members, conducted COVID-19 testing and implemented infection prevention and control protocols on board. The ship sailed from Port Kembla on 16 April 2020.

Aspen Medical was contracted by the Australian Capital Territory (ACT) Government to design and build a temporary hospital in response to the COVID-19 pandemic. Known as the Garran Surge Centre, the facility was located on Garran Oval, a sports field to the northeast of the existing Canberra Hospital campus. On 21 May 2020, the hospital was opened after only 37 days of construction. Shortly after, on 24 May 2020, ACT health authorities announced the hospital would likely remain unused due to the successful prevention of a major outbreak in the ACT. The facility was repurposed as a COVID-19 testing and assessment center, and in 2021 as a vaccination hub.

On 13 April 2020, the Australian Government announced that Aspen Medical had been "engaged to deploy the emergency response teams immediately to an aged care facility if a significant outbreak occurs". Shortly after the announcement, Aspen Medical sent a team to Newmarch House in the Nepean Valley where an outbreak of COVID-19 had begun on 11 April 2020. Media attention focused on two members of the Aspen Medical team sent to Newmarch House who had previously been on board the Ruby Princess whilst it was docked in Port Kembla. Aspen Medical said in a statement that "both of the workers who had boarded the Ruby Princess tested negative for Covid-19 before being deployed to the aged-care home". NSW Government's Chief Health Officer Dr Kerry Chant confirmed in a press conference held on 6 May 2020 that Aspen Medical's team was not the source of any transmission of the virus at the Newmarch House residential aged care facility.

==== July 2020 ====
Aspen Medical was requested to send a surge team to another high-profile outbreak at the Fawkner location of St Basil's Homes for the Aged in Victoria. Media reporting suggested that the company was taking over the management of the facility. Aspen Medical clarified its role as a provider of last resort and one of over 20 companies assisting at St Basil's and was not managing the facility.

==== January 2021 ====
On 21 January 2021, the Australian Government announced that Aspen Medical, along with other healthcare providers, had been appointed to provide a vaccine workforce to supplement the existing immunization workforce for specific vulnerable groups across Australia. Logistics and distribution of the COVID-19 vaccine was contracted to DHL Supply Chain and Linfox by the Australian Government.

=== 2021; Al Minhad, United Arab Emirates ===
The Australian Government Department of Foreign Affairs and Trade (DFAT) contracted Aspen Medical to set up a clinic for Afghan evacuees in support of the Kabul Airlift in August 2021.

Established at Al Minhad Air Base near Dubai in the United Arab Emirates, the facility supported more than 700 Afghan citizens including children over 19 days in the joint evacuation operation by the Australian Defence Force (ADF), DFAT and Aspen Medical.

== Operations ==
=== Australia ===
==== Defence ====
In 2005, the company was awarded a contract to provide health services to Australian Defence Force (ADF) personnel at Puckapunyal Military Area. This was followed by a similar contract at the ADF base at Albury Wodonga Military Area in 2007.

Between 2012 and 2016, the firm provided sub-contracted medical services with approximately 1000 staff at over fifty Defence sites Australia-wide. At that time, it was the largest services tender for healthcare professionals conducted by the ADF Joint Health Command. The company was also delivering 'Care of Battle Casualty' first aid training to ADF personnel deploying to the Middle East.

Aspen Medical has partnered with Saab to train more than 2,500 Australian Defence Force (ADF) personnel to use flexible and modular field hospitals during military and humanitarian missions.

==== Resources ====
Aspen Medical has a number of contracts in the Resources sector in Australia. The company has been contracted by Bechtel to provide medical and emergency response services for the Woodside Energy-operated Pluto Train 2 Project. The Pluto Train 2 Project includes the construction of a second LNG train at the existing Pluto LNG onshore facility near Karratha in Western Australia.

==== Remote Areas ====
Aspen Medical works in remote areas in Australia providing a number of services. The company:

- Developed the Western Australia Resources Aero Medical Evacuation program for seven oil and gas companies working in the North West Shelf off WA.
- Established the Remote Area Health Corps (RAHC) in 2008. The RAHC was created to address ongoing and chronic workforce shortages in remote Aboriginal communities in the Northern Territory. The program name has since changed to the Northern Territory Remote Locum Program (NTRLP).
- Since 2011, administering the Australian Government's Nursing and Allied Health Rural Locum Scheme (NAHRLS). This scheme provides short term locum staff to rural and remote locations in Australia to relieve permanent residential staff undertaking professional development or taking leave. In 2016, NAHRLS was amalgamated with the Rural Obstetric and Anaesthetic Locum Scheme (ROALS) and the Rural Locum Education Assistance Program (Rural LEAP) and was subsequently renamed the Rural Locum Assistance Program (Rural LAP). In 2022, the program was expanded by the Australian Government to provide support to eligible aged care services in rural and remote Australia.

==== Aeromedical retrievals ====
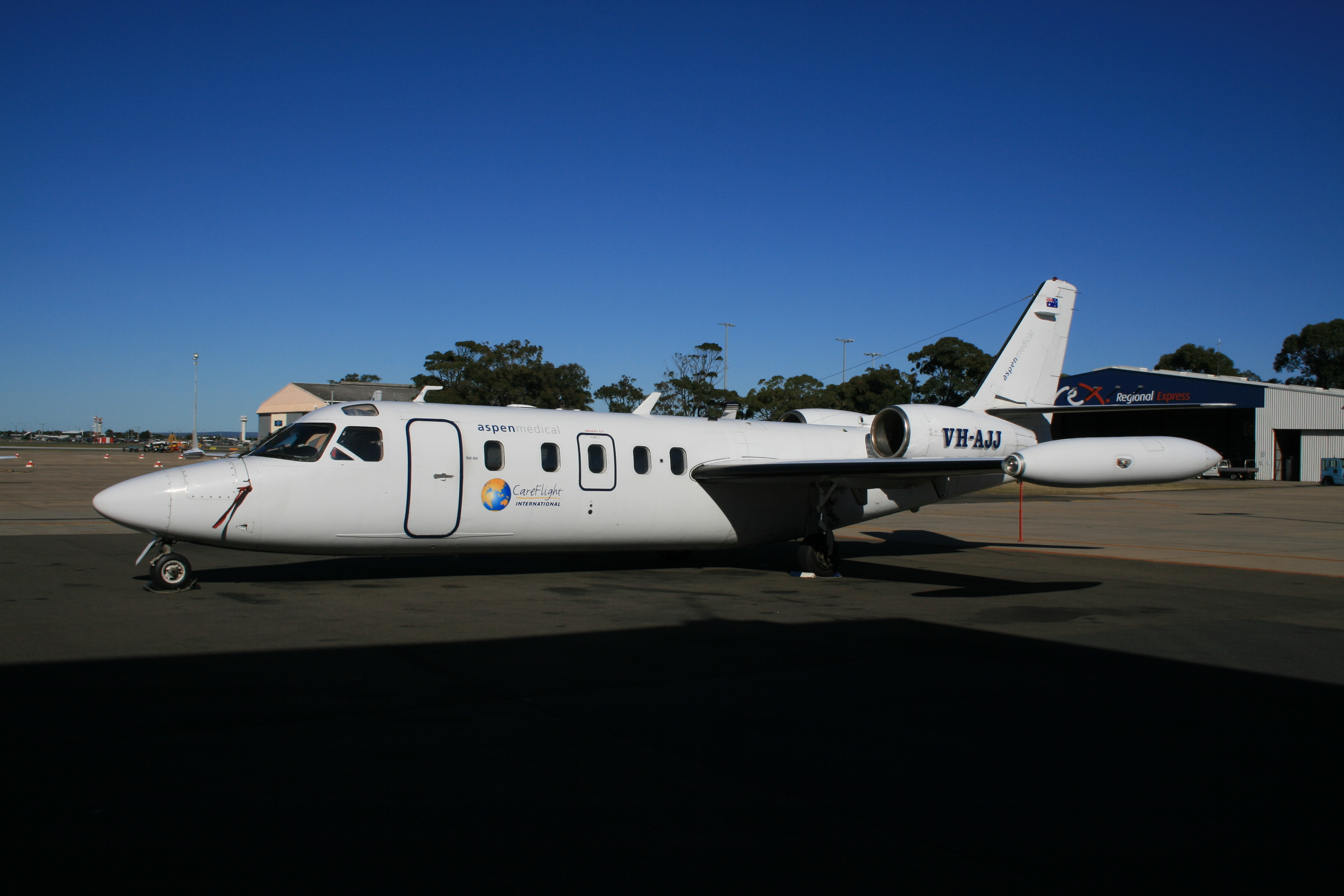
CareFlight International IAI Westwind medical retrieval aircraft with Aspen Medical titles

Aspen Medical has supplied aeromedical retrieval services for the Australian Defence Force, state governments, and large businesses in the resources sector.

The company supports the Western Australia Resources Aero-Medical Evacuation contract. This contract makes two aircraft, with stretchers and critical care capabilities, available 24/7/365 to facilitate the deployment of a doctor and paramedic throughout Western Australia.

In 2020, Aspen Medical first partnered with Avcair to develop an integrated approach to aeromedical retrieval.

Aspen Medical provides inflight clinicians, and Avcair operates and maintains the aviation assets, some of which include Aspen Medical aircraft.

==== Marine ====
Aspen Medical is contracted to provide a range of medical services on board the CSIRO vessel RV Investigator. This company also provides medical support and accredited training on board a number of Australian Border Force marine vessels.

==== Aged care ====
Aspen Medical provides surge workforce in aged care services impacted by COVID-19. The company was also brought in to assist at aged care homes affected by floods in North Queensland in February 2025.

==== Health technology ====
In September 2025, Aspen Medical announced the launch of Vitaport, a workplace health and wellbeing platform using agentic artificial intelligence.

=== United Arab Emirates ===
Aspen Medical has been operating in the United Arab Emirates since 2003. In August 2022, Aspen Medical opened the first of six primary health centers in Abu Dhabi, United Arab Emirates. The rural primary health centers are jointly operated in coordination with the Department of Health (Abu Dhabi) as part of governmental plans to expand primary health care in the Emirate of Abu Dhabi.

=== Fiji ===
In 2019, Aspen Medical entered into a 23-year public-private partnership with the Fijian Government to manage Lautoka Hospital and Ba Hospital on the north-west of Fiji's main island.

Aspen Medical commenced the first permanent cardiac surgery service in Fiji at Lautoka Hospital in 2022. In January 2024, day surgeries recommenced at Ba Hospital after a one-year hiatus attributed largely to staffing challenges. A new cardiac catheterisation laboratory, MRI suite and an expanded emergency department were opened at Lautoka Hospital in July 2025 as part of a FJ$11 million investment.

In October 2025, Ba Hospital was accredited by Joint Commission International.

=== Indonesia ===
Sanusa Medika Hospitals, a joint venture majority-owned by Aspen Medical and Dr Andrew Rochford's Docta Pty Limited, began construction of a 200-bed hospital in Depok, West Java in June 2023. The hospital is the first of a planned 23 hospitals and 650 community clinics by the joint venture, which also includes Indonesian state-owned enterprise PT Jasa Sarana, which has a 10% stake in the joint venture company.

Designed by Emerald Hospital Design, a joint venture between Deerns Groep B.V., Dutch Health Architects B.V. and PT Teamworx Indonesia, the Aspen Medical International Hospital Depok is expected to cost between A$60 million and A$75 million to build. Building work began in 2024 on the 24,000 square foot facility.

=== Ukraine ===
Aspen Medical has partnered with the US-based Henry M. Jackson Foundation for the Advancement of Military Medicine to undertake a study into Ukraine's combat casualty care and the lessons learnt from the first large-scale conflict fought between two countries in Europe since World War II. This work has been commissioned by the US Department of Defense, with the findings supporting Ukraine's medical capabilities through data analysis and training and developing lessons for US and allied forces. In 2026, Aspen Medical worked with health professionals and medical researchers in Lviv in research into treatments for combat-related post-traumatic stress disorder (PTSD), including the use of stellate ganglion block and ketamine-based therapies. The company also worked with Octapharma and Security Service of Ukraine (SBU) on the deployment of freeze-dried plasma for frontline medical teams, including trials of delivery by drone.

=== Somalia ===
Aspen Medical provides healthcare services to the UN Support Office in Somalia (UNSOS) in Mogadishu.

=== Papua New Guinea ===
Aspen Medical operates a general practice clinic in Port Moresby and a medical centre in Lihir in the New Ireland Province.

=== Haiti ===
Aspen Medical is subcontracted by Amentum to operate a Role 2 Field Hospital in Port-au-Prince in support of the Multinational Security Support Mission in Haiti.

== Corporate social impact ==
In 2022, Aspen Medical provided 8 jobs for people from socially disadvantaged backgrounds living in the Koroipita community in Fiji. These opportunities fall under the organisation's plan to employ 20% of its non-clinical workforce from people with disabilities and from disadvantaged backgrounds.

In February 2024, Aspen Medical and its charitable organisation, Aspen Medical Foundation, funded a prosthetic limb plus all travel and accommodation expenses for 8-year-old Fijian schoolchild Elenoa Gukiwasa. The child had lost her left arm following a traffic accident involving a school bus near Lautoka Hospital in June 2023.

On 8 February 2024, Alcoa Foundation announced a partnership with Aspen Medical Foundation to provide prosthetic limbs and specialized rehabilitation training in Ukraine. Alcoa Foundation has provided funding of US$330,000 to Aspen Medical Foundation to work closely with First Medical Union (FMU) on the Unbroken project which provides services including reconstructive surgery, orthopedics, robotic prosthetics, and comprehensive physical, psychological, and psychosocial rehabilitation.

On 16 February 2024, the Australian College of Nursing (ACN) announced the 22 recipients of the 'Bullwinkel Scholarships' on the anniversary of the massacre on Bangka Island, Indonesia, on 16 February 1942. The scholarships carry the names of the 21 nurses who died and the sole survivor, Lt Col Vivian Bullwinkel. The scholarship in the name of Lt Col Bullwinkel has been funded by the Aspen Medical Foundation.

== Controversy ==
In May 2022, Aspen Medical featured on the ABC program, Four Corners. After the episode aired, Aspen Medical issued a media release in response.

== Awards ==
- 2025 International Stability Operations Association (ISOA) Vanguard Award
- 2023 Diversity Council Australia Inclusive Employer
- 2021 Export Hall of Fame
- 2018 National Exporter of the Year (Joint Award)
- 2016 International Project Management Association (IPMA) Gold Medal for Ebola Response in West Africa

== Certification ==
Aspen Medical has been a certified Benefit Corporation (B Corp) since 2016.

Since 2018, Aspen Medical has been classified by the World Health Organization as a specialised Emergency Medical Team (Outbreak and Surgical).

Aspen Medical has been a participant in the UN Global Compact since March 2019.

In 2025, Aspen Medical was recognised by the Australian Government Department of Veterans Affairs (DVA) as a veteran employer of choice.
