= Walter Merriman =

Australian sheep breeder

Sir Walter Merriman
- Portrait of Sir Walter Merriman
- Born: 18 January 1882; Yass, New South Wales
- Died: 25 January 1972 (aged 90); Yass, New South Wales
- Occupation: Sheep breeder

Sir Walter Merriman (1882–1972) was an Australian sheep breeder who bred a new type of Merino sheep which produced a high quality and high yield fine soft wool which is regarded as "some of Australia's finest wool". This Merino wool, known today as the "Merryville" type, has contributed for more than half a century to Australia's export-earning wool industry.

== Early life and education ==
Merriman was born on 18 May 1882 in Yass, New South Wales. His parents were George Merriman, a sheep breeder, and Mary Ann, née Dowling. Beginning in 1865 his father developed a fine-wool merino stud named Ravensworth in the Yass district, based on bloodlines from Tasmania and from Mudgee, New South Wales. Walter attended the Public School in the village of Murrumbateman.

== Career ==
In 1903 Walter Merriman established his own stud named Merryville located on part of his father's Ravensworth property. At the beginning his sheep were Merinos of the "Saxon" type. He acquired ewes and a sire from his father's estate and in 1911 added sheep of the Peppin bloodline to his flock. In 1915 he acquired more ewes and rams from Ravensworth and in 1921 more from the Murgha stud dispersal sale in Deniliquin.

He became known for breeding fine-woolled sheep. Undertaking "selective breeding practices", he protected the quality of his clip by keeping his flock, now registered with the name of the Merryville-Murgha Stud, separate from the sheep on other properties.

In 1937 he formed a family company, Merryville Pty Ltd, and extended his holdings to included properties at Yass, Boorowa, Murrumbateman, Bowral and Narrandera.

An expert wool classer, Merriman saw his merinos win top prizes at the Royal Agricultural Society's Sydney Sheep Show as well as in similar shows in Melbourne, Albury, Goulburn, Dubbo and Yass. During his long career that lasted half a century he not only maintained the quality of his fine merino wool but increased "average yield of his flock to fourteen lb. (6 kg) a head and at the same time more than doubling the yield of his top breeds".

== Community service ==
Over the years he served in local government as a member of the local Goodradigbee Shire Council, was president of the Yass Pastoral and Agricultural Association, and served in senior posts in the local bush fire brigade, Yass District Hospital, the Pastures Protection Board and the local District Soldiers' Memorial and Literary Institute.

== Honours ==
- 1954: Knighted "for services to the wool industry"

== Personal life ==
Merriman diedin Yass on 25 January 1972. His grave is located in the Murrumbateman cemetery.

Sir Walter Merriman's youngest son, Bruce Merriman, became the managing director of Merriville after his father's death, and Bruce's son, Walter ("Wally") Merriman, continued the family connection to the Australian merino wool industry, serving as the chairman of the non-profit, Australian Wool Innovation (AWI).
