= Yass Tribune =

Newspaper in NSW, Australia

- Publisher: A.G. Brander
- Founded: 1879
- Language: English
- Headquarters: Yass, New South Wales
- Country: Australia
- Website: Yass Tribune

The Yass Tribune is an English-language newspaper published in Yass, New South Wales, Australia.

== History ==
The Yass Courier was first published in 1854.
The Yass Evening Tribune was first published in 1879 by A G Brander and was published under this title until 1929.
In 1888 AG Brander took over the Gunning Times.
In April 1929 the two papers combined under the name Yass Tribune-Courier with the numbering continuing from the previous Tribune issue, #5108, the next issue then re-numbered as #2.

== Digitisation ==
The earlier editions of the Tribune and Courier have been digitised as part of the Australian Newspapers Digitisation Program project of the National Library of Australia.

== See also ==
- List of newspapers in New South Wales
