= Goodradigbee Shire =

Former local government area in New South Wales, Australia

- Local government area
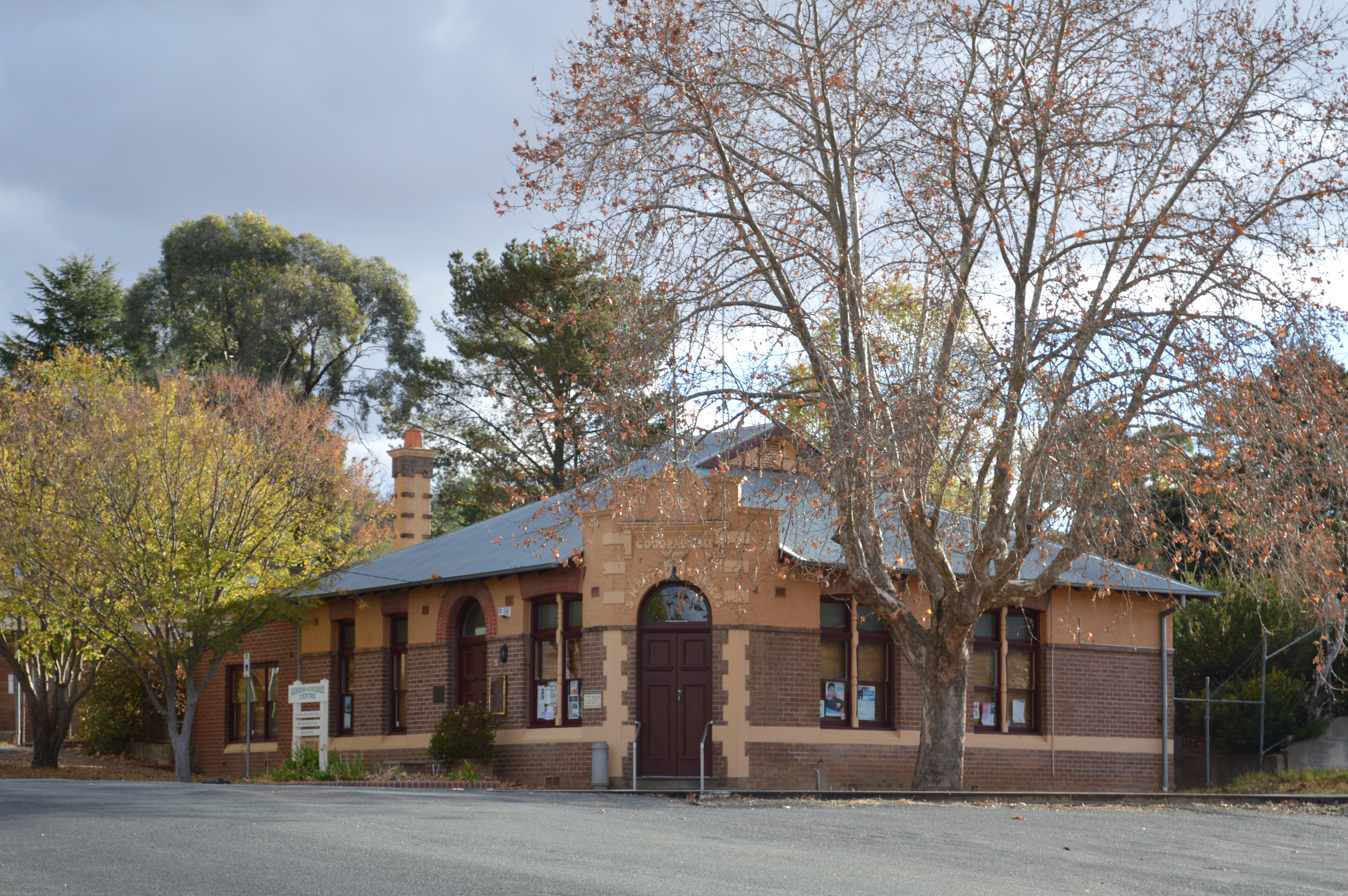
- The former Goodradigbee Shire chambers in Yass, built in 1910
- Country: Australia
- State: New South Wales
- Region: Southern Tablelands
- Established: 1906
- Abolished: 1 January 1980
- Council seat: Yass

Goodradigbee Shire was a local government area in the Southern Tablelands region of New South Wales, Australia.

The Shire was established in 1906 and its offices were based in the town of Yass. In 1975 Goodradigbee Shire was merged with the Municipality of Yass to form Yass Shire.
