= Yass River railway bridge, Yass =

Yass River railway bridge
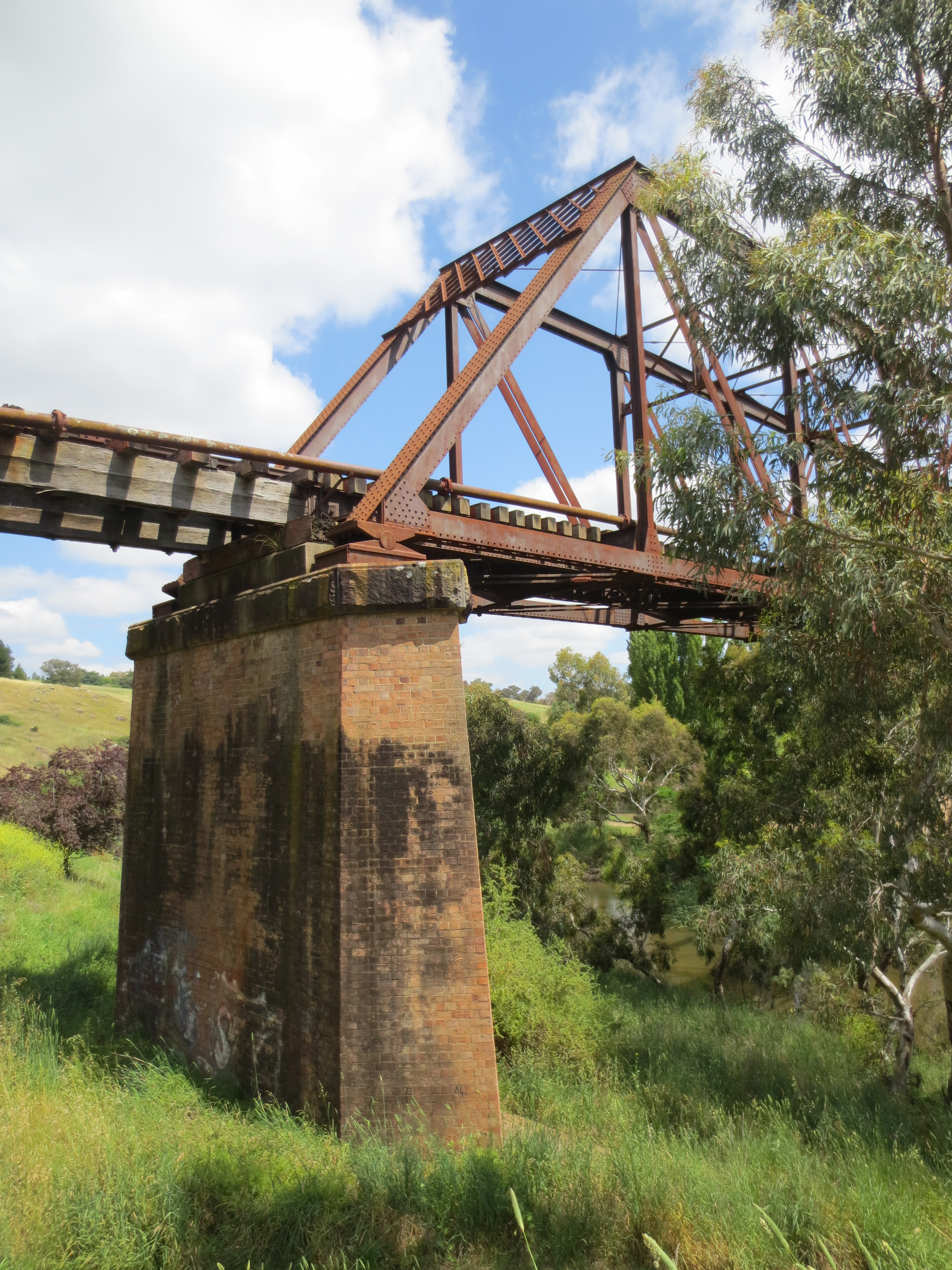
- Coordinates: 34°50′21″S 148°54′22″E
- Carries: Yass Town Tramway
- Crosses: Yass River
- Locale: Yass, Yass Valley Shire, New South Wales, Australia
- Begins: Yass Junction (north)
- Ends: Yass station (south)
- Other names: Yass Town rail bridge over Yass River; Yass Town Truss
- Owner: Transport Asset Manager of New South Wales

Characteristics
- Design: Pratt truss bridge
- Material: Steel
- Pier construction: Brick
- Total length: 61 metres (200 ft)
- Longest span: 61 metres (200 ft)
- No. of spans: 1

Rail characteristics
- No. of tracks: One
- Track gauge: 4 ft 8 1/2 in (1,435 mm) standard gauge

History
- Contracted lead designer: C. Fischer
- Engineering design by: NSW Government Tramways
- Constructed by: McGill & Son
- Fabrication by: O. McMasters, North Sydney
- Construction end: 1892
- Construction cost: A£5,412
- Inaugurated: 20 April 1892 by the Earl of Jersey, NSW Governor
- Closed: 14 November 1988 (regular services)

New South Wales Heritage Register
- Official name: Yass Town rail bridge over Yass River; Yass Town Truss
- Type: State heritage (built)
- Designated: 2 April 1999
- Reference no.: 1292
- Type: Railway Bridge/Viaduct
- Category: Transport – Rail
- Builders: O. McMasters, North Sydney (fabrication); McGill & Son (erection)

The Yass River railway bridge is a heritage-listed disused railway bridge that carries the decommissioned Yass Town Tramway across the Yass River at Yass in the Southern Tablelands region of New South Wales, Australia. It was designed by engineer C. Fischer and NSW Government Tramways and built in 1892 by O. McMasters, North Sydney (fabrication) and McGill & Son (erection). It is also known as the Yass Town rail bridge over Yass River and the Yass Town Truss. It is owned by Transport Asset Manager of New South Wales. It was added to the New South Wales State Heritage Register on 2 April 1999.

== History ==
When the extension of the Main South Railway from Goulburn to Cootamundra was being planned in 1870 it was intended to take the line into Yass Town. However, following a site visit by Engineer-in-Chief John Whitton who recognised the route would involve more than one crossing of the Yass River by expensive iron bridges, the line was shifted 5 kilometres (3 mi) north which required no crossings of the river but bypassed the town. Despite the vehement protests of the townsfolk, the Departmental route was adopted and the line was completed to Bowning (north west of Yass) in July 1876 with a station approximately 3 kilometres (2 mi) north of Yass Town.

So, although the Yass residents could not have the main line through their town, they persistently petitioned successive governments to have a branch line and were eventually successful. In 1889 the Minister for Public Works authorised construction of a lightweight railway or tramway from the renamed main line station, Yass Junction, to the town. Although one option was for the tramway to stop at the Yass River and transship passengers and goods the short distance into town via the existing iron lattice road bridge, it was decided that the tramway had to go into the town, so a large 61-metre (200 ft) span steel truss was built over the river.

The bridge represented a gross over-capitalisation of a line that would prove to be operationally expensive and never showed a profit. Contractors Kerr & Cronin completed the line in July 1891 for A£13,156 and McMasters' bridge cost A£5,412; in an all up cost of A£27,318. The bridge represented 20% of the final cost of the line. The line was subsequently opened by the Governor, the Earl of Jersey, on 20 April 1892.

Despite the Railway's displeasure with the line, the bridge was in fact a technical milestone. Prior to this, the dominant main line metal bridge was the heavy wrought iron lattice truss, fully imported from England. But on the eve of John Whitton's retirement, the winds of change were blowing. The technical and economic merits of American bridges was widely recognised and independent groups of engineers in the Railway Construction Branch under Henry Deane, the Existing Lines Branch under George Cowdery and those in the Tramway Branch were designing and planning to construct large American steel trusses and Yass got the first.

The next group were the main line trusses on the Murwillumbah railway line and the change over to American bridge technology was complete.

== Description ==
The bridge consists of a single span, lightweight steel Pratt truss of 61 m (200 feet) span on brick piers with timber beam approaches.

Despite its abandonment, the bridge retains its original fabric and structure.

== Heritage listing ==
As at 16 March 2006, The Yass Town railway truss is highly significant because it was the major component of infrastructure on the historic (infamous) Yass Tramway, it is a highly visible and imposing structure and it set the course for the adoption of American bridge technology in lieu of the previous dominance of British bridges so favoured by John Whitton. Despite being abandoned, it still retains its original fabric. It is a landmark structure in the history of railway bridges in New South Wales.

Yass Town rail bridge over Yass River was listed on the New South Wales State Heritage Register on 2 April 1999 having satisfied the following criteria.

The place is important in demonstrating the course, or pattern, of cultural or natural history in New South Wales.

The bridge was the major component of infrastructure on the historic (infamous) Yass Tramway.

The place is important in demonstrating aesthetic characteristics and/or a high degree of creative or technical achievement in New South Wales.

Although the lightweight truss is out of service it is still an impressive structure high above the Yass River, easily accessible from adjacent parkland and visible to all road users crossing the river nearby.

The place has a strong or special association with a particular community or cultural group in New South Wales for social, cultural or spiritual reasons.

The tramway and its magnificent bridge inflated the ego of the town but was never a social or commercial success. Eventually, Yass prospered by direct road links to the main line at Yass Junction.

The place has potential to yield information that will contribute to an understanding of the cultural or natural history of New South Wales.

The Tramway may have been a colonial folly but the bridge was a technology landmark, being the first American style bridge used for a railway in New South Wales (the Nowra Bridge was intended for railway used but has been a road bridge). It set the course for the adoption of American bridge technology in lieu of the previous dominance of British bridges so favoured by John Whitton.

The place is important in demonstrating the principal characteristics of a class of cultural or natural places/environments in New South Wales.

An excellent, highly visible, example of a large American Pratt truss.

== See also ==
The location of the bridge on the Yass Tramway
- List of railway bridges in New South Wales
