= Municipality of Yass =

Former local government area in New South Wales, Australia

Yass Municipal Council New South Wales
- Established: 13 March 1873
- Abolished: 1 January 1980

Yass Municipality was a Local Government Area of New South Wales from 1873 until 1980, when it was merged with Goodradigbee Shire to create Yass Shire.
