= Yass, New South Wales =

Yass
- Town
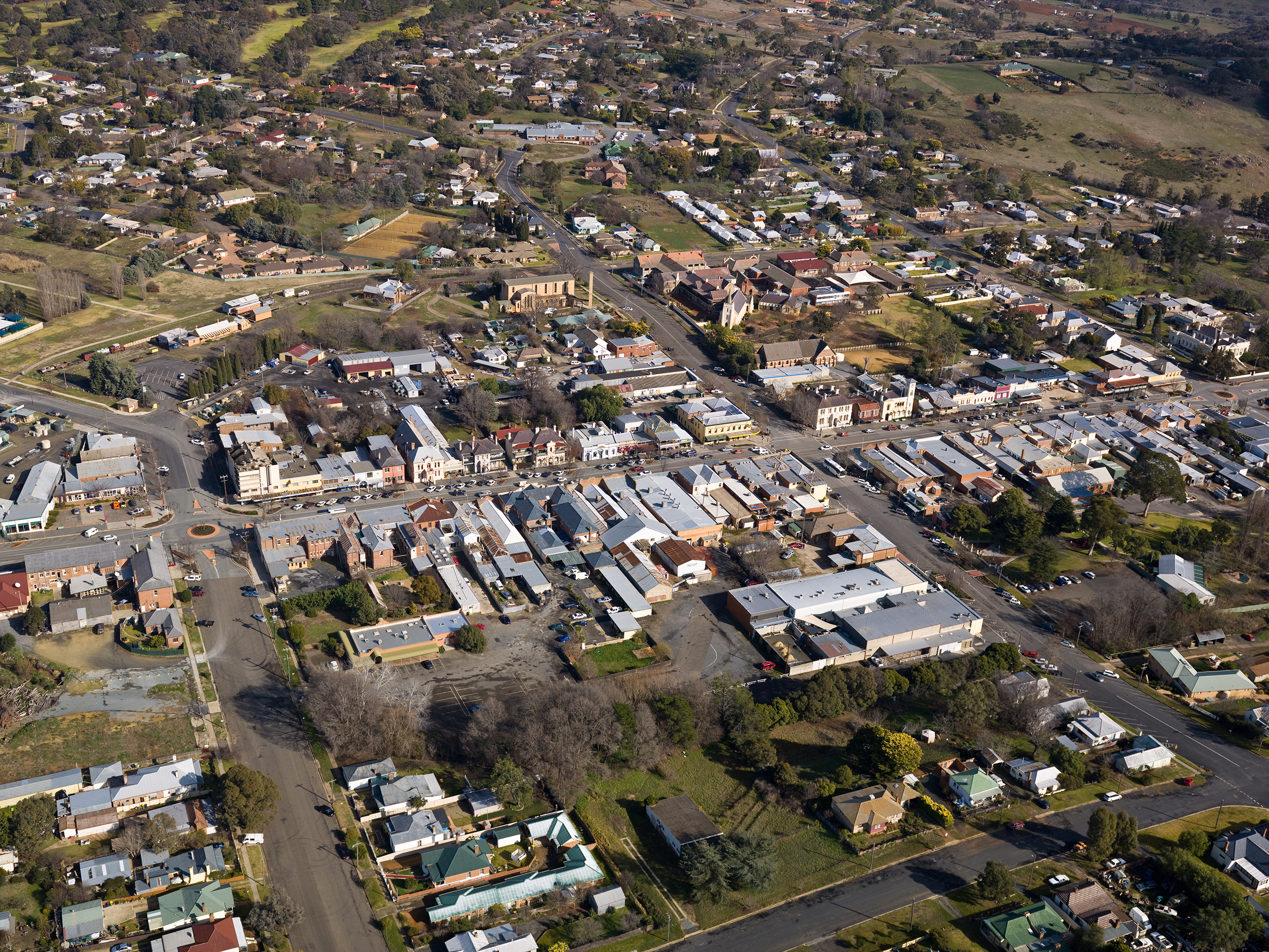
- Aerial photograph of Yass

- Interactive map of Yass
- Coordinates: 34°49′0″S 148°54′0″E
- Country: Australia
- State: New South Wales
- Region: Southern Tablelands
- LGA: Yass Valley Council
- Location: 279 km (173 mi) SW of Sydney; 59 km (37 mi) NW of Canberra; 83 km (52 mi) W of Goulburn; 96 km (60 mi) SE of Young; 99 km (62 mi) ENE of Gundagai
- Established: 1837

Government
  - State electorate: Goulburn
  - Federal division: Riverina
- Elevation: 505 m (1,657 ft)

Population
  - Total: 6,763 (2021 census)
- Postcode: 2582
- County: Murray
- Parish: Hume
Localities around Yass
| Bowning | Bango | Bango |
| Bowning | Yass | Manton |
| Good Hope | Boambolo | Marchmont |

Yass (/jæs/) is a town on the periphery of the Southern Tablelands and South West Slopes of New South Wales, Australia. The name appears to have been derived from an Aboriginal word, "Yarrh" (or "Yharr"), said to mean 'running water'.

Yass is located 280 km south-west of Sydney, on the Hume Highway, and is 59 km from Canberra. It lies at an elevation of 505 metres. The Yass River, which is a tributary of the Murrumbidgee River, flows through the town.

Yass has a historic high street, with well-preserved 19th-century verandah post pubs (mostly converted to other uses). It is popular with tourists, some from Canberra and others taking a break from the Hume Highway.

== History ==
=== Aboriginal overview ===
The area around Yass is the land of the Ngunawal tribe. They knew the area as yarrh, which means "running water." The final "rr" sound was spelled in English with a double-S, apparently after being misheard as such due to its "sharp and forcible" quality.

=== Colonial overview ===
The Yass area was first seen by Europeans in 1821, during an expedition led by Hamilton Hume. By 1830, settlement had begun where the nascent Sydney to Melbourne road crossed the Yass River. The site for the town was gazetted in 1837. Yass was incorporated as a District Council in 1843, and boasted a population of 274 by 1848. On 13 March 1873, the Municipal District of Yass was created, and James Cottrell was subsequently elected as the first Mayor of Yass.

One of Australia's best-known poets, A.B. 'Banjo' Paterson, arrived in the district in 1871 at the age of seven, passed his childhood there, and later bought a property in the Wee Jasper area so that his children could experience country life. Poet and priest Patrick Hartigan (pen name: John O'Brien) was born near Yass in 1878, and studied at the local convent school as a youth.

Sir Walter Merriman established 'Merryville', one of the country's most famous sheep studs, and arguably its leading fine-wool establishment, in 1903. Yass is a prominent area for raising sheep which produces very fine wool due to the soil and climatic conditions.

Yass was one of the sites proposed for the Federal Capital after 1901, before Canberra was ultimately chosen. The proposed site would have been slightly west of the township of Yass, which would have been included in the surrounding federal territory.

In 1956, Yass became the first town in New South Wales to have a fluoridated water supply. The Hume Highway passed through the town until a bypass opened in July 1994.

Historic Yass

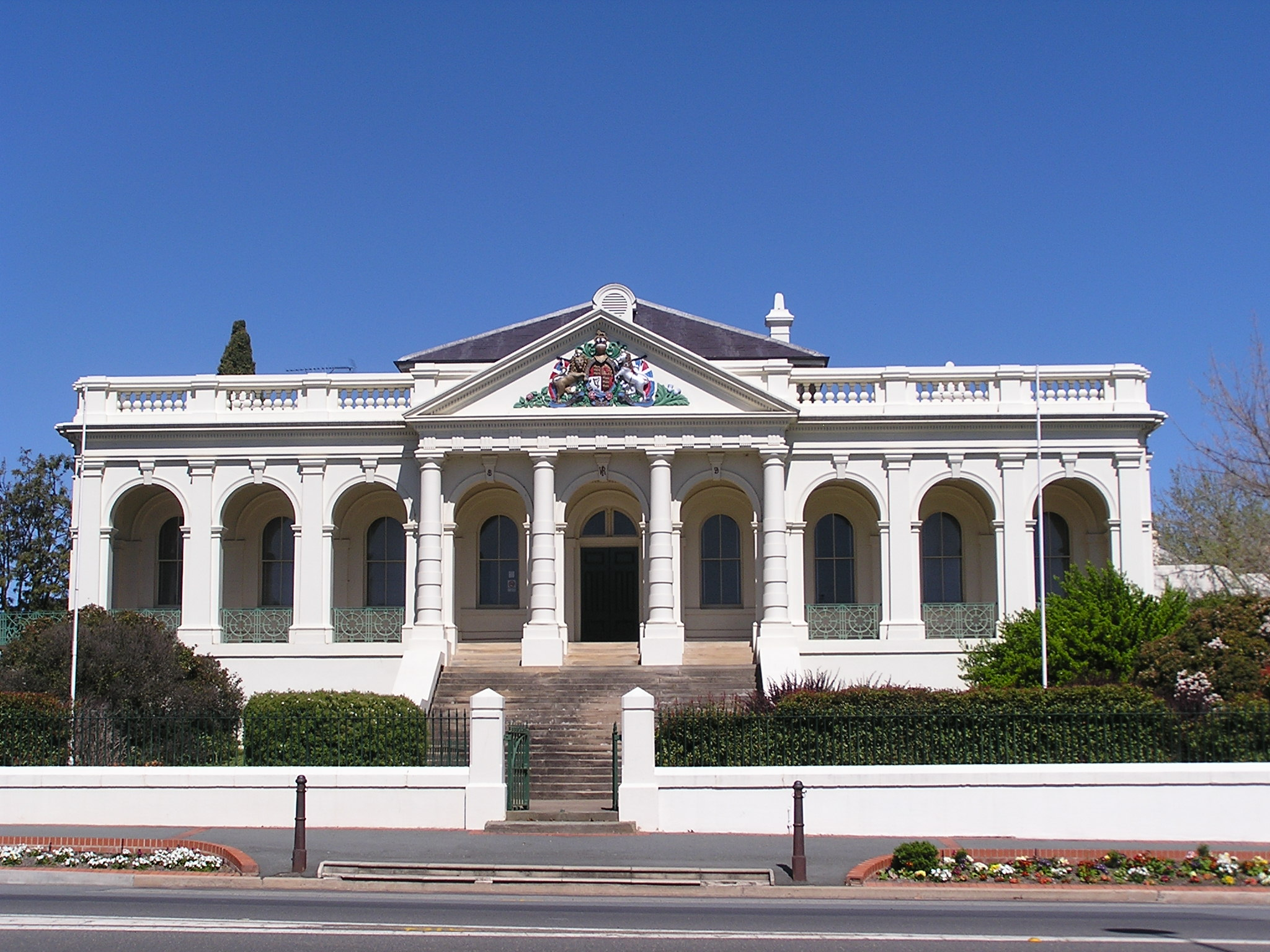
Yass Court House designed by Colonial Architect, James Barnet. The building was officially opened in 1880

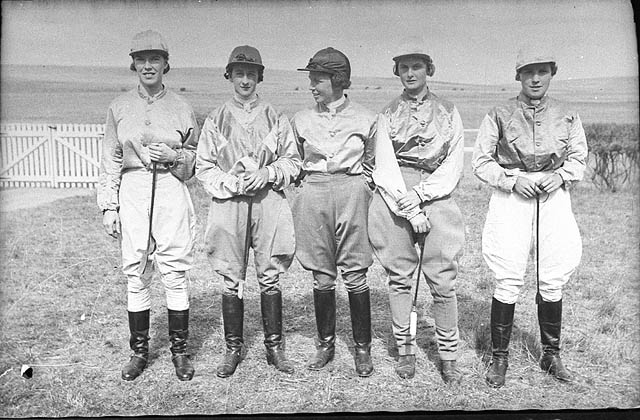
Jockeys prepare for the Yass Races, in 1936

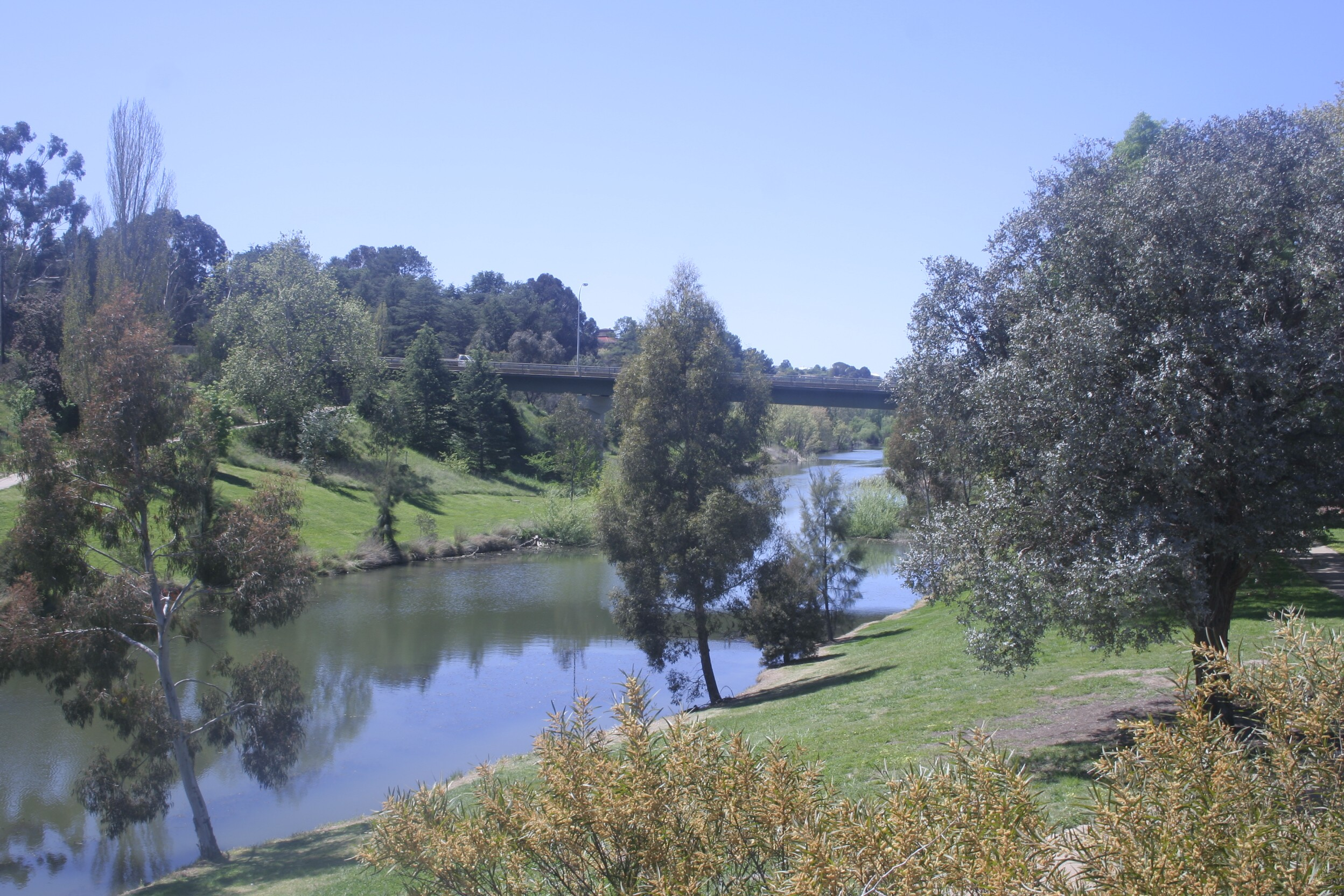
Hume Bridge over Yass River

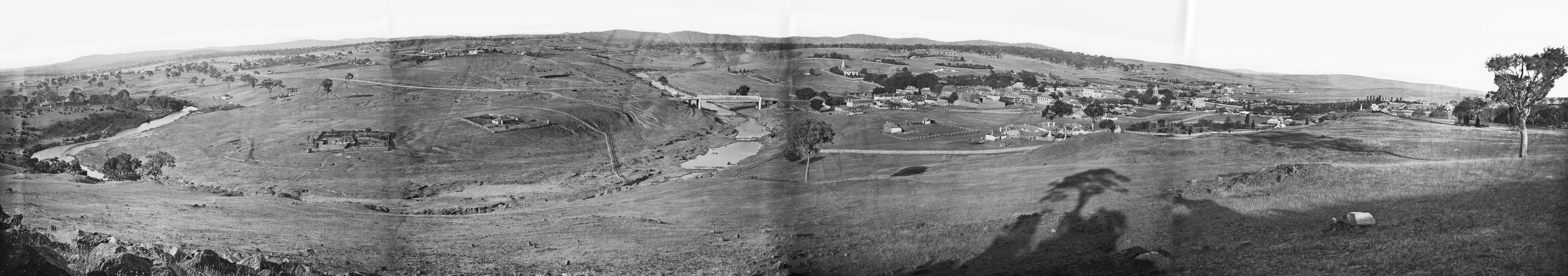
Yass Town panorama circa 1870-1875

=== Flour milling ===
It has never been explained why Yass was the home to a number of flour mills, especially as the district is well known for the production of fine merino fleece. Linge notes that many flour mills were set up for the personal convenience of settlers rather than commercial operations (Linge 1979:108); it may be that the mills were set up to grind locally produced grain for largely domestic consumption.

Bayley in his history of Yass records that, in March 1842, it was reported that the Yass Steam Mill was in operation (1973:24). This mill was located by the Yass River and was owned by the partnership of Hamilton Hume and John Watson. The mill was known as Watson's Mill, and it seems to have operated until it was destroyed in a flood in 1870. At that time, it was owned by Thomas Andrew Barber (Ames et al. 2001:9).

Barber was the son of the George Barber (who, with Hume, first explored Yass) and was also Hume's nephew. These connections no doubt lead to the choice of the site of Barber's next mill as the land was originally owned by Hume. Barber constructed a new steam mill and, by May 1870, steam was raised and the mill itself opened in June 1870 (Bayley 1973:46). According to Armes et al., the Barber family "occupied surviving housing on the corner of Comur and Adele Street" (2003:9). This mill, it is argued, is the existing brick structure known as "Crago's Flour Mill". The mill was operated by Barber until 1876, when he handed over his business interests to his sons Earnest and John, who traded under the name Barber Brothers.

Meanwhile, another steam mill – the Union Steam Mill – had been established, and by 1881, was owned by Petherick Tamblyn Crago. In around 1881 Crago purchased a site for a new mill between the White Horse Inn and Barber's Mill. The mill was called the Commercial Mill and from newspaper reports was operating from 1882. According to Ralph Crago (letter 1970), the decision to erect the new mill was because the machinery in the old Mill (presumably the Union Steam Mill) was worn out.

The Barbers declared bankruptcy in October 1889, and in December 1889 there was a meeting in Yass to discuss the mill. The meeting was told that the machinery was 50 years old, the foundations of the mill were 4 1/2 feet deep and that a new mill would take 12 months to construct while the existing mill could be made operational in the New Year. The mill recommenced trading in January 1891.

A notable event occurred in 1892 when Yass was finally connected to the New South Wales Government Railways' Main Southern railway line. However, by the time the tramway reached the mills Barber's Mill was only operating intermittently. It is not clear from newspaper reports, but it seems Barber tried to sell the mill in 1895, but was unsuccessful and eventually the mill was purchased from an Ann Ross by Arthur Bryant Triggs, a prominent local businessman, in September 1897. Triggs began rebuilding the old Barber's mill, presumably as a roller mill. He also arranged for a siding to be constructed from Yass Station across Lead Street to the mill. Triggs opened the "new" mill in March 1898, but later that year in August sold the mill to Crago. This is the mill now standing in Yass.

According to information from Ralph Crago (letters written in 1955 and 1970) "Around – once more it is only a guess - the turn of the century or early in the new one – the stones [in the Commercial Mill] were replaced by steel rollers by a firm called Henry Simon & Co & the steam power was replaced by suction gas made from charcoal. We bought a lot of our charcoal from the Jerrawa area when small farmers added to their income & trucked it by rail to Yass." and "The Crago Brothers were very proud of winning a bronze medal at the Wembley Exhibition in the early 1900s for flour made at Yass".

In the aerial photograph of the site of the two mills taken in 1927 the chimneys of both mills have been removed suggesting that their steam engines were non-operational from at least that time. However, the Commercial Mill continued working until 1953. Ralph Crago, who was manager from 1947 onwards, noted that the Mill bought wheat locally but also from the surrounding district and harder wheat from the Gunnedah district was imported to blend with the softer "southern" wheat. All this wheat was bagged wheat but in 1953 the Wheat Board decided to cease the use of bagged wheat. Faced with the cost of erecting bulk handling facilities, the Crago family sold the Commercial Mill to the stock and station agents Winchombe Carson.

Winchombe Carson demolished the Commercial Mill in 1953 and erected a number of buildings on the site which were in turn demolished in July 2009, during which time remains of the Commercial Mill were excavated by an archaeological team.

A freezing works were established by Winchombe Carson at the site of Barber's Mill and numerous galvanised iron buildings were erected mainly to store bagged wheat for the Commercial Mill. After the Commercial Mill was demolished the Crago Mill (as Barber's Mill is now known) was used for storage and remains the only surviving above-ground remains of the four Flour Mills in Yass.

Both the standing mill building - Crago Mill and the archaeological remains of the Commercial Mill - were listed on the Register of the National Trust of Australia (NSW) in March 2014.

Historical population
| Year | Pop. | ±% |
|---|---|---|
| 1921 | 2,502 | — |
| 1933 | 2,866 | +14.5% |
| 1947 | 3,254 | +13.5% |
| 1954 | 3,662 | +12.5% |
| 1961 | 3,909 | +6.7% |
| 1966 | 4,100 | +4.9% |
| 1971 | 4,259 | +3.9% |
| 1976 | 4,247 | −0.3% |
| 1981 | 4,283 | +0.8% |
| 1986 | 4,529 | +5.7% |
| 1991 | 4,828 | +6.6% |
| 1996 | 4,840 | +0.2% |
| 2001 | 4,884 | +0.9% |
| 2006 | 5,333 | +9.2% |
| 2011 | 5,591 | +4.8% |
| 2016 | 5,466 | −2.2% |
| 2021 | 5,837 | +6.8% |
Source: Australian Bureau of Statistics data.

=== Railways ===
Yass was a battleground between the town and the Sydney to Melbourne railway; because of the topography, the New South Wales Government Railways wanted to bypass the town by a few kilometres. Naturally, the people of the town wished the railway to pass closer or through it. In 1892 a light railway or tram was built to connect Yass Junction on the main line and Yass Town. The railway bridge across the Yass River was the first lightweight, steel Pratt-truss bridge in the NSW railway network.

The last trains operated on the line on 29 October 1988 when steam locomotives 1210 and 3112 operated three final journeys on the line.

The Yass Railway Heritage Centre uses the Yass Town station precinct as a museum. Yass had the nearest railway station on the Sydney Melbourne railway to serve the national capital at Canberra.

When the standard gauge railway between Sydney and Melbourne opened in 1961, the parliamentarian deserving most of the credit - William Charles Wentworth - was unable to leave parliament since his vote was needed in an almost hung parliament. Instead of catching the inaugural train at Sydney, he had to catch it at Yass Junction, where it made a special stop.

Yass railway heritage

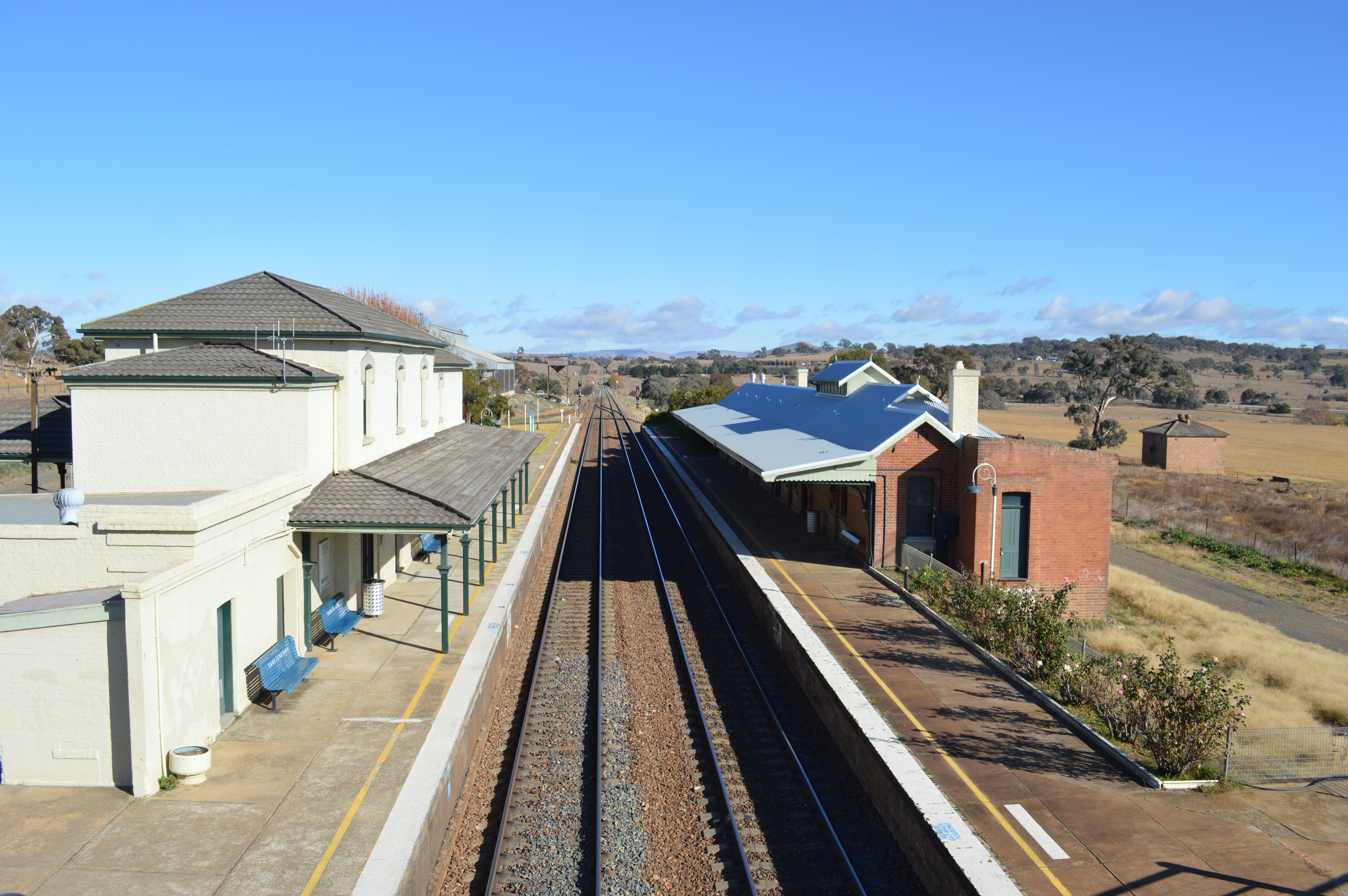
Yass Junction railway station

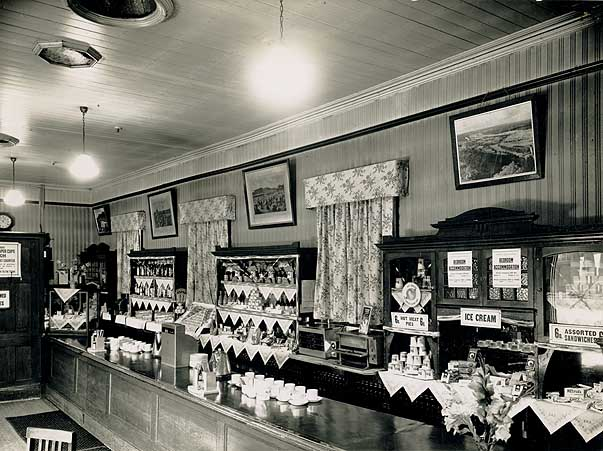
Yass Junction Railway Refreshment Room, 1949

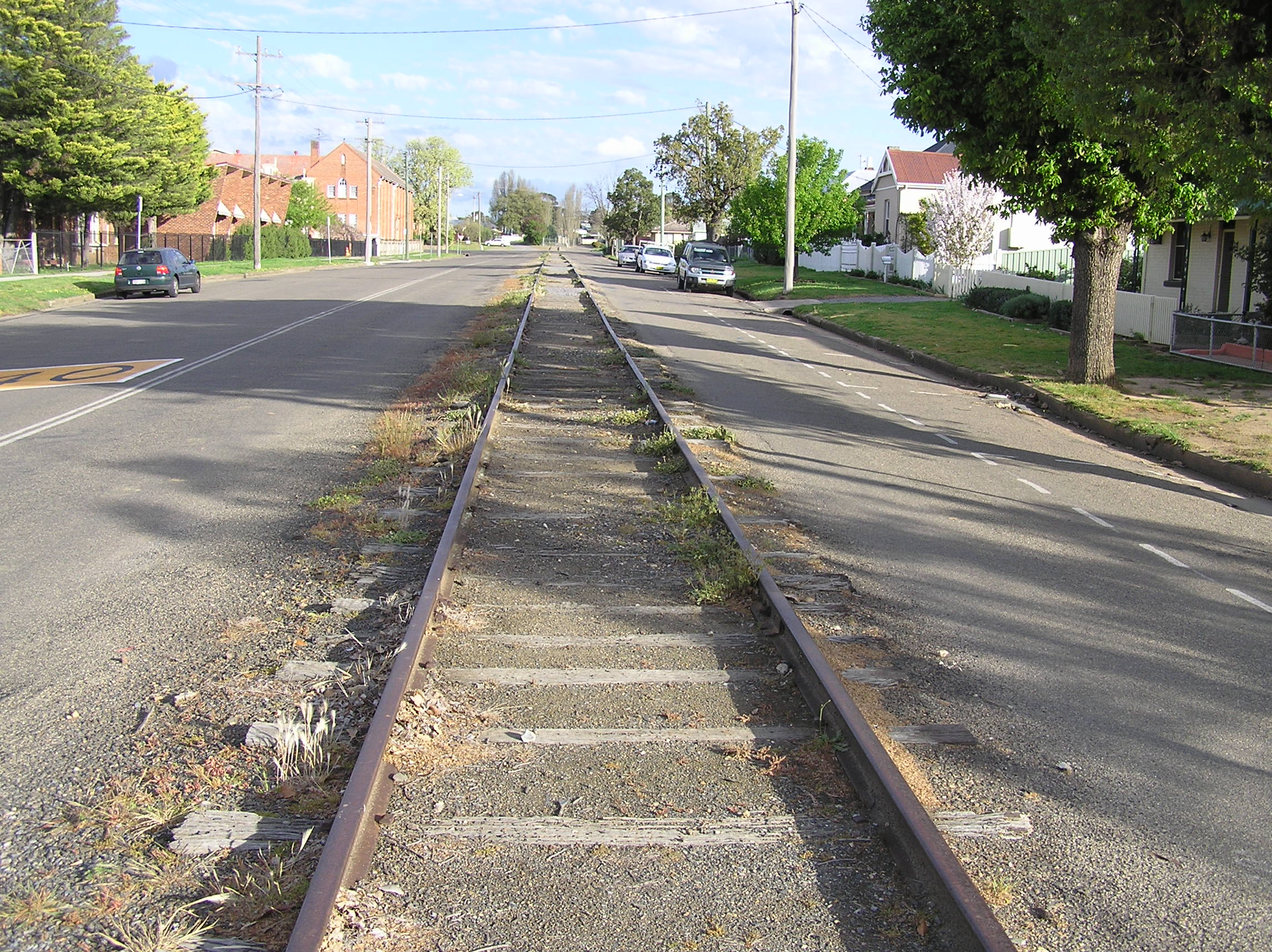
Disused tramline, Dutton St.

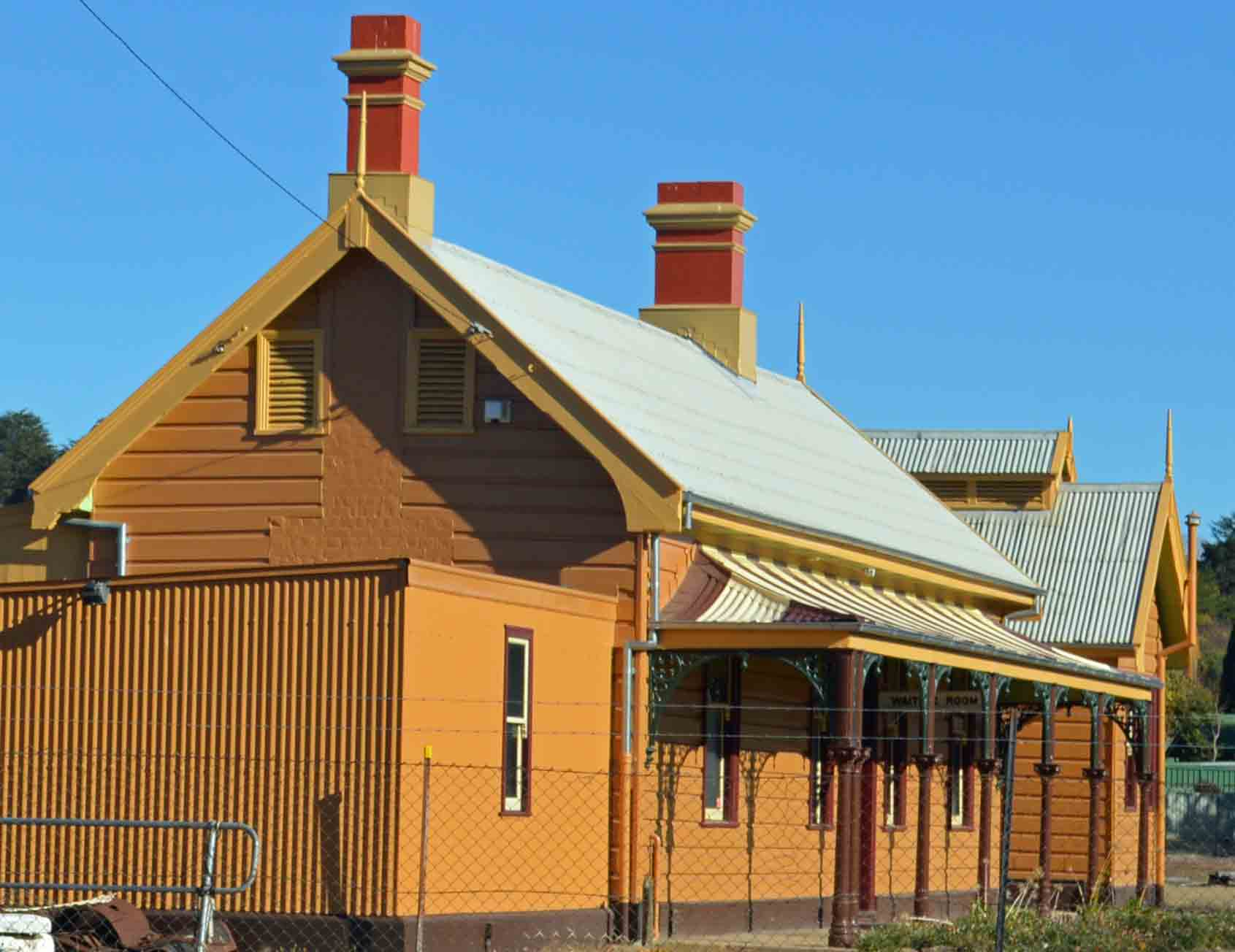
Yass Town railway station, now a museum

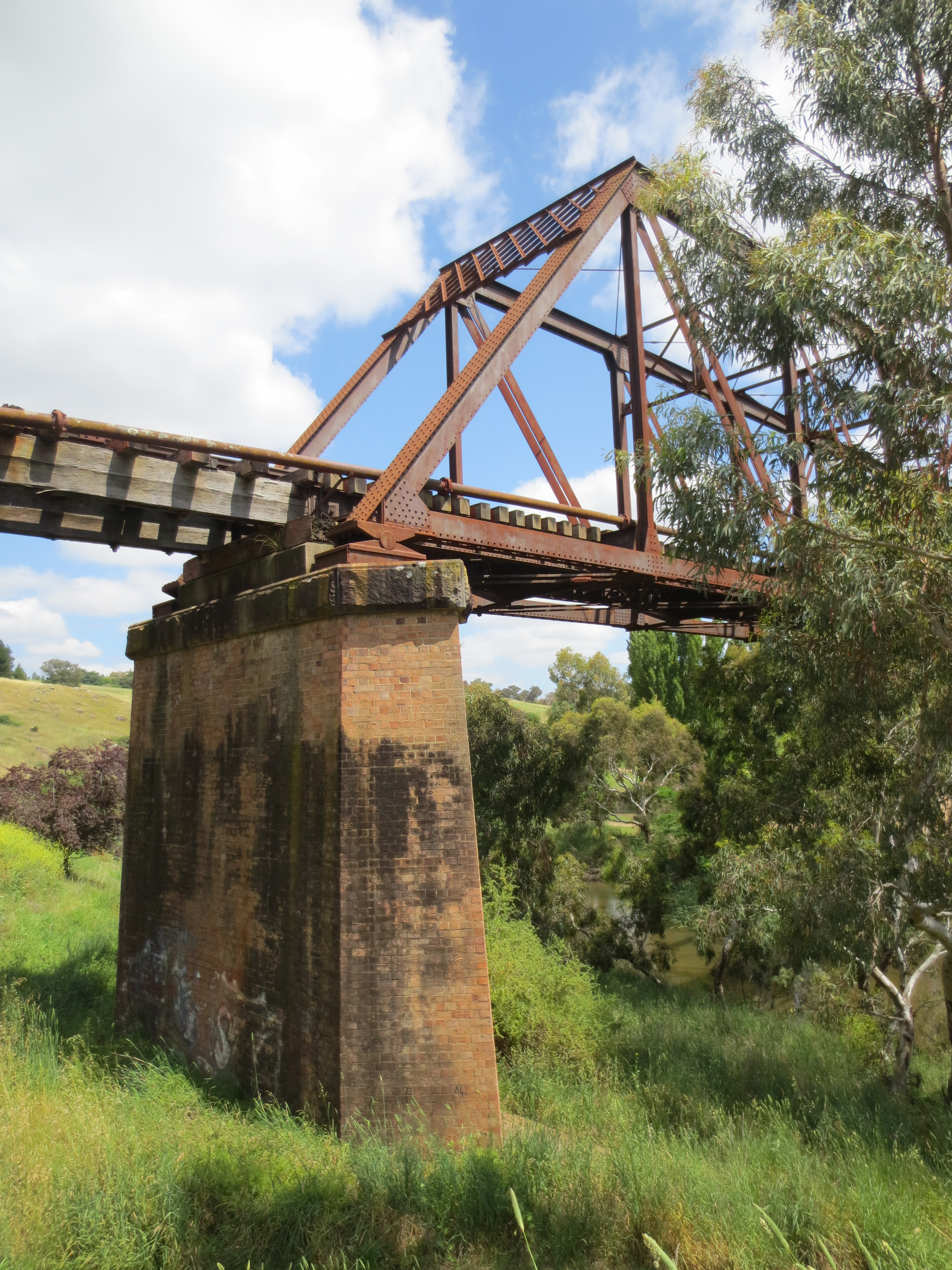
Disused railway bridge and abutment, Riverbank Park, Yass

== Heritage ==
=== Heritage listings ===
Yass has a number of heritage-listed sites, including:

- 101 Comur Street: Yass Post Office
- Main Southern railway: Yass Junction railway station
- Yass Town Tramway: Yass Town rail bridge over Yass River
- Yass Town Tramway: Yass Town railway station
- Yass Valley Way, Marchmont: Cooma Cottage

==== Cooma Cottage ====
Cooma Cottage is one of the oldest surviving rural houses in New South Wales. It has historic significance as a relatively intact complex of rural buildings and links to explorer and grazier Hamilton Hume. It is listed on the NSW Heritage register and is managed by the National Trust (NSW).

==== St Augustine's Catholic Church ====
St Augustine's Parish Yass began in 1838 with the laying of the foundation stone of the church now called the chapel.

A striking modernist new building (the 'big' church) was begun in 1954 under the eye of the then Bishop Young, later Archbishop of Hobart. The architect for the church was architects Fowell Mansfield and Maclurcan of Sydney. The builder was James Wallace of 123 Sussex Street, Sydney.

There are important works of art by renowned Australian sculptor Tom Bass in the Church:

- the crucifix on the outside
- the crucifix on the rear doors
- the statue of St Paul and
- the recently installed low-relief of St Augustine near the front door.

The foundation stone of the new church was laid on 11 April 1954 by Archbishop Eris O'Brien and the church was opened on 29 April 1956, by Archbishop Guilford Young.

Fifty-year celebrations were organised on 29 April 2006 by Father Laurie Bent, who was Parish Priest in Yass at the time.

==== Yass & District Museum ====
The Yass & District Museum represents Yass from the 1820s. Exhibitions pay tribute to the life and work of explorer and grazier Hamilton Hume, Yass soldiers and nurses who served in 20th-century wars, the Inns of Yass, Burrinjuck Dam; and illustrate a 19th-century shop, parlour and kitchen, rural life and work in a woolshed.

Yass heritage sites

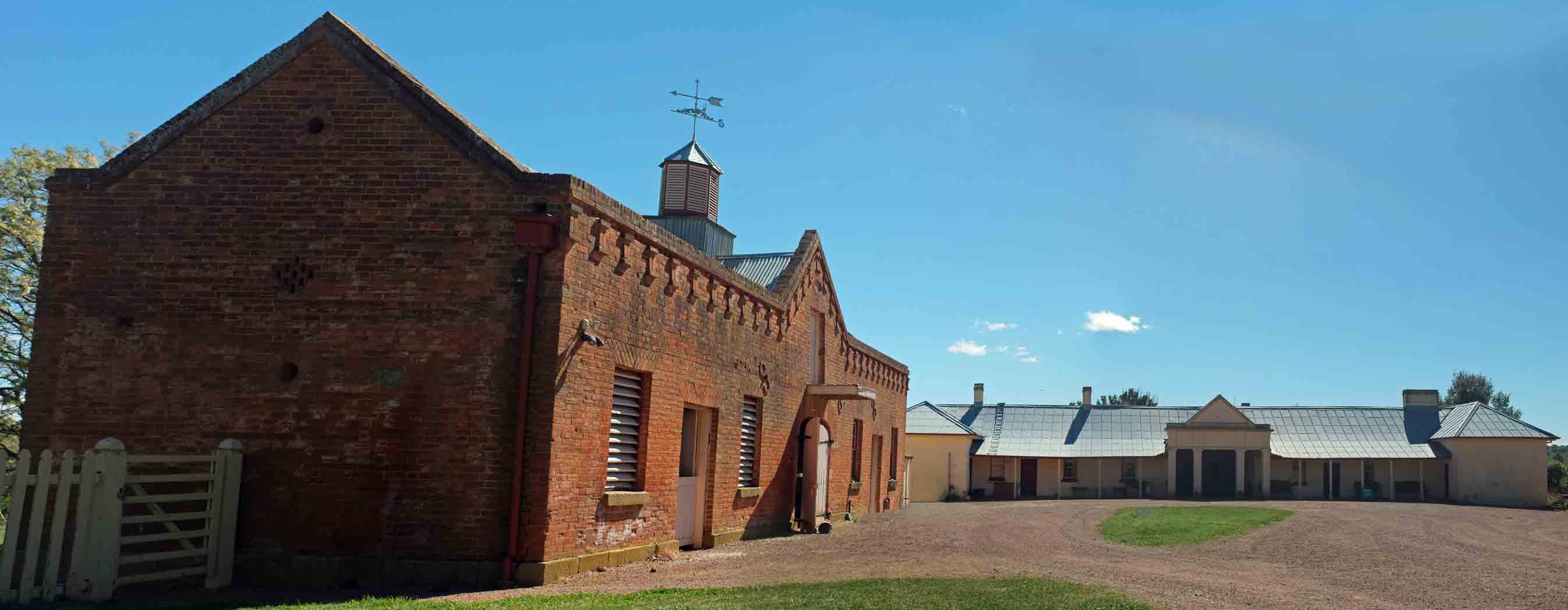
Cooma Cottage – The stables and house

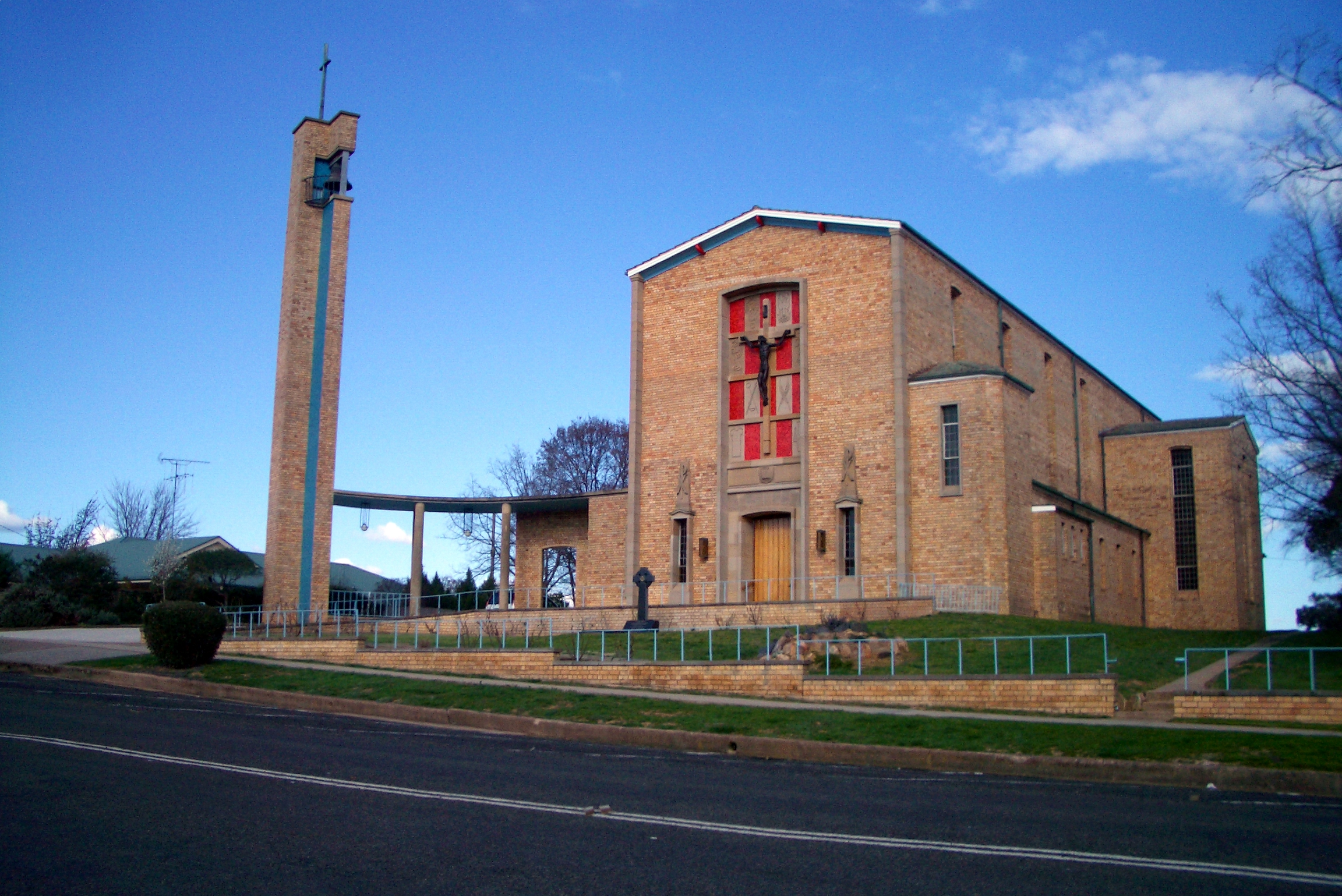
St Augustine's Church

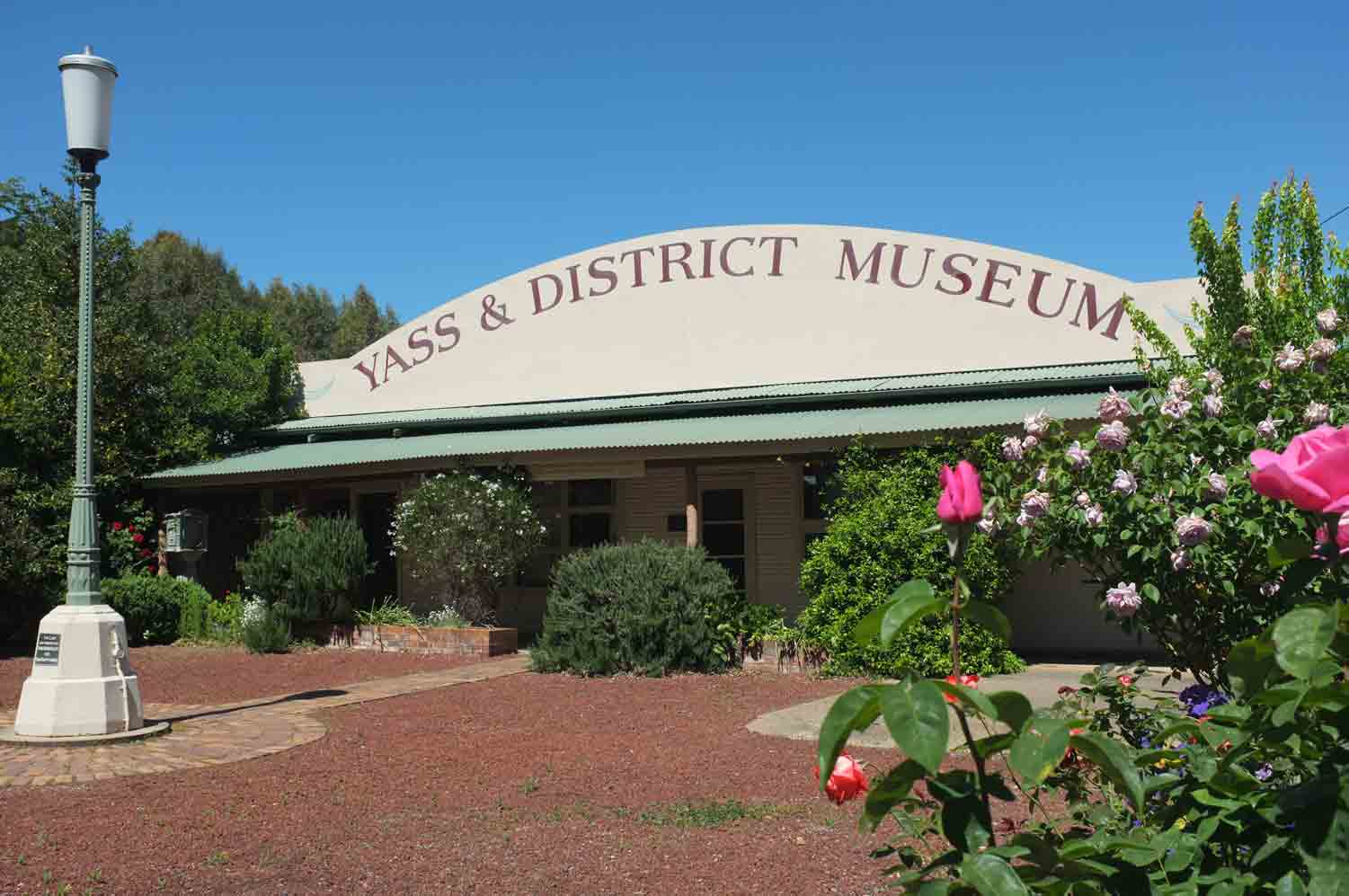
Yass & District Museum

== Climate ==
The climate in Yass is intermediate between the Southern Tablelands and South West Slopes, having characteristics of both zones. Compared to Goulburn, it has a wider seasonal range and notably wetter winters relative to other seasons, though not quite to the extent as those of Bookham. Yass has a relatively dry climate owing to its rainshadow from the southwest (being east of Conroys Gap), however is exposed to the west and northwest. Snow falls occasionally but is usually light and rarely settles, though heavy snowfalls do occur on the hills to the southwest (around Wee Jasper).

Climate data for Yass (Linton Hostel, 1907–2011, rainfall to 1898); 520 m AMSL; 34.83° S, 148.91° E
| Month | Jan | Feb | Mar | Apr | May | Jun | Jul | Aug | Sep | Oct | Nov | Dec | Year |
|---|---|---|---|---|---|---|---|---|---|---|---|---|---|
| Record high °C (°F) | 41.2 (106.2) | 41.1 (106.0) | 38.0 (100.4) | 33.9 (93.0) | 24.5 (76.1) | 20.5 (68.9) | 22.0 (71.6) | 25.8 (78.4) | 28.9 (84.0) | 32.7 (90.9) | 39.5 (103.1) | 40.0 (104.0) | 41.2 (106.2) |
| Mean daily maximum °C (°F) | 29.5 (85.1) | 29.0 (84.2) | 25.8 (78.4) | 21.2 (70.2) | 16.4 (61.5) | 12.6 (54.7) | 11.6 (52.9) | 13.4 (56.1) | 16.6 (61.9) | 20.5 (68.9) | 24.3 (75.7) | 27.7 (81.9) | 20.7 (69.3) |
| Mean daily minimum °C (°F) | 14.0 (57.2) | 14.0 (57.2) | 11.1 (52.0) | 7.0 (44.6) | 4.0 (39.2) | 2.2 (36.0) | 1.1 (34.0) | 1.9 (35.4) | 4.0 (39.2) | 6.3 (43.3) | 9.3 (48.7) | 11.9 (53.4) | 7.2 (45.0) |
| Record low °C (°F) | 4.0 (39.2) | 3.1 (37.6) | 0.0 (32.0) | −3.5 (25.7) | −7.0 (19.4) | −7.0 (19.4) | −8.8 (16.2) | −7.5 (18.5) | −3.9 (25.0) | −1.8 (28.8) | −1.2 (29.8) | 1.5 (34.7) | −8.8 (16.2) |
| Average precipitation mm (inches) | 50.3 (1.98) | 45.5 (1.79) | 46.7 (1.84) | 49.0 (1.93) | 49.9 (1.96) | 57.9 (2.28) | 59.6 (2.35) | 59.3 (2.33) | 56.8 (2.24) | 64.5 (2.54) | 56.6 (2.23) | 55.8 (2.20) | 651.9 (25.67) |
| Average precipitation days (≥ 0.2 mm) | 5.9 | 5.1 | 5.5 | 6.1 | 7.5 | 10.1 | 11.2 | 10.8 | 9.4 | 8.8 | 7.2 | 6.5 | 94.1 |
| Average afternoon relative humidity (%) | 40 | 41 | 44 | 49 | 60 | 69 | 67 | 62 | 56 | 50 | 45 | 40 | 52 |
Source: Bureau of Meteorology

== Education ==
- Mt Carmel School, Catholic co-educational primary school
- Berinba Public School
- Yass Public School
- Yass High School

== Media ==
=== Television ===
Yass receives five free-to-air television networks relayed from Canberra that broadcast from the Black Mountain.

- ABC
- SBS
- Seven
- WIN Television (Nine)
- 10

=== Radio ===
The town is served by these local radio stations:

- ABC Radio Canberra on 666 AM (national)
- Hit 104.7 on 104.7 FM (commercial)
- KIX Country on 92.7 FM (commercial)
- 2CA on 1053 AM/105.7 FM (commercial)
- Yass FM on 100.7 FM (community)
- Valley FM on 89.5 FM (community)
- 2YYY on 92.3 FM (community)

=== Newspapers ===
The local newspaper is the Yass Tribune.

A locally run independent newspaper, the Yass Valley Times, distributes weekly editions through Yass businesses and its website.

== Governance ==
Yass is in the local government area of Yass Valley Council. At a state level, Yass is in the electorate of Goulburn represented by Wendy Tuckerman. At a federal level, Yass is in the electorate of Riverina represented by Michael McCormack.

== Notable residents ==
- Jack Beaton, rugby league player
- Ray Beavan, rugby league player
- Peter Bracken, rugby league player
- Margaret Coen, artist
- Thomas Collins, politician
- Thomas Colls, politician and hotelier
- John Costello, pastoralist
- Ian Craig, cricketer
- Horse race trainer Lee Freedman and his brothers Anthony, Michael and Richard grew up in Yass.
- Pearl Gibbs, Indigenous activist
- Alice Giles, harpist
- Francis Gilmore, cricketer and rugby league player
- Chris Guider, rugby league player
- Jacob John Halley, congregationalist minister
- Max Hollingsworth, rugby league player
- Cyril Hopkins, New Zealand cricketer
- Duncan Ironmonger, economist
- Pat Larter, artist
- Peter Leonard, journalist
- Donald George Mackay, cyclist and explorer
- Rod McGregor, rugby league player
- Ben McNeill, film producer
- Sir Walter Merriman – sheep breeder, knighted in 1954 for his contributions to the fine wool industry
- John O'Brien, priest and poet
- Jason Raize, American actor (died here in 2004)
- Billy Rayner, rugby league player
- Edwin Sautelle, civil engineer and mayor of Vaucluse
- Craig Wilkinson, guitarist of the rock band RedHook, attended and graduated from Yass High School.
- Colin York, rugby league player

== Local events ==
The Yass Show is held in March, the Turning Wave Festival from 2012 to 2017 in September, and the Yass Arts-and-Crafts Festival in November, along with numerous other festivals and events throughout the year.

In 2021 the Yass Show was scheduled for 20 March. Usually a two-day event, it was reduced to one day to allow volunteers to handle the restrictions imposed due to the COVID-19 pandemic in Australia. It will start earlier, and finish later.

== In popular culture ==
In 2018, the town was featured in Queer Eye, a Netflix original series. The town was chosen as its name matches one of the cast's favourite sayings: yaass.

The lead character in the Australian sitcom Colin from Accounts hails from Yass; he brings his live-in girlfriend home to meet the family in a second-season episode.

Yass is also notable for a humorous billboard advertising the town's McDonald's restaurant, which shows the McDonald's logo and the town's name (making it read "M YASS, opens at 6 AM", similar to "my ass").

In the modern novel An Indecent Obsession by Colleen McCullough, Yass is the residence of the main character Honour Langhtry, the heroine of the story.

== Gallery ==
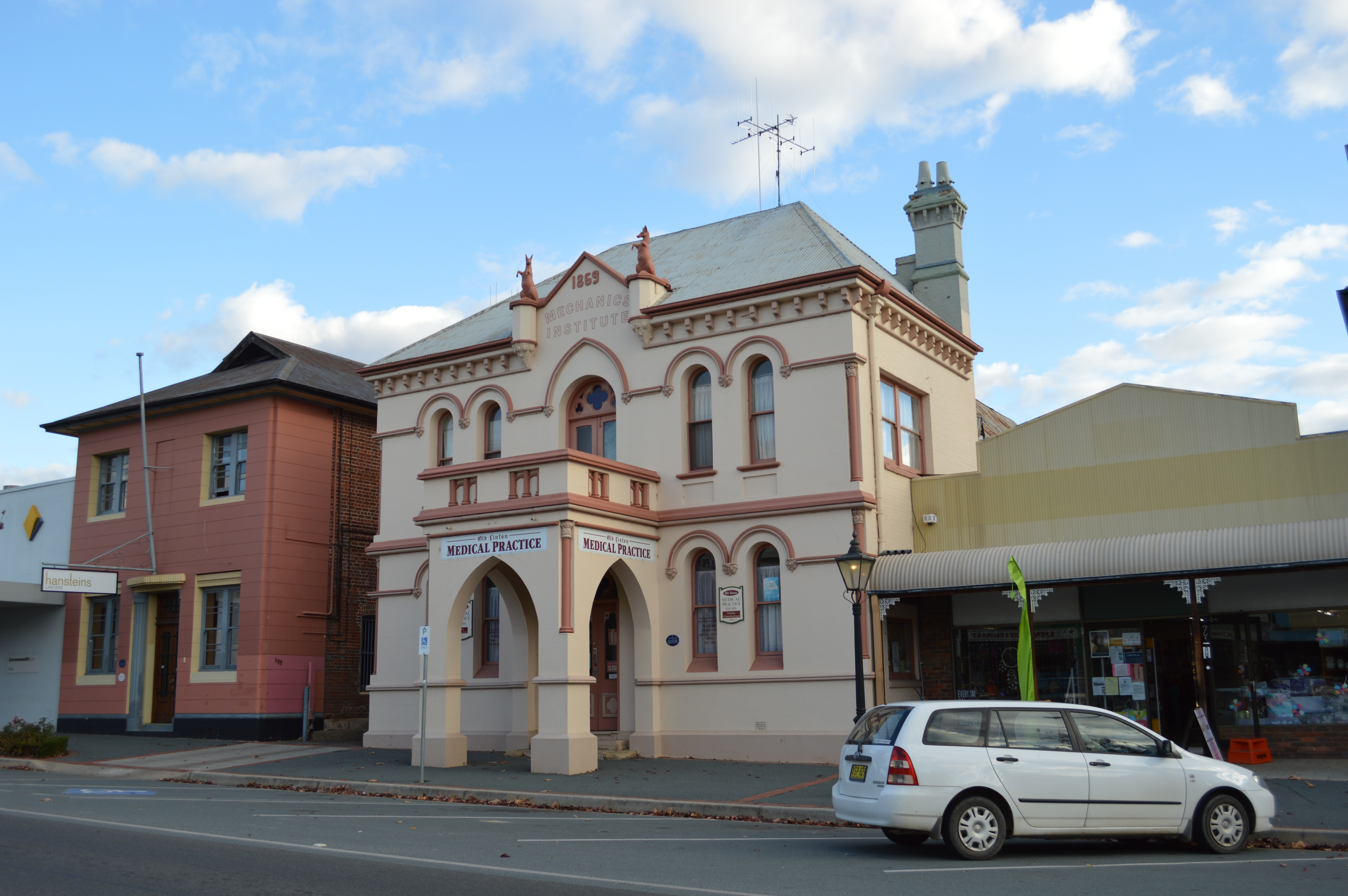
Yass Mechanics Institute

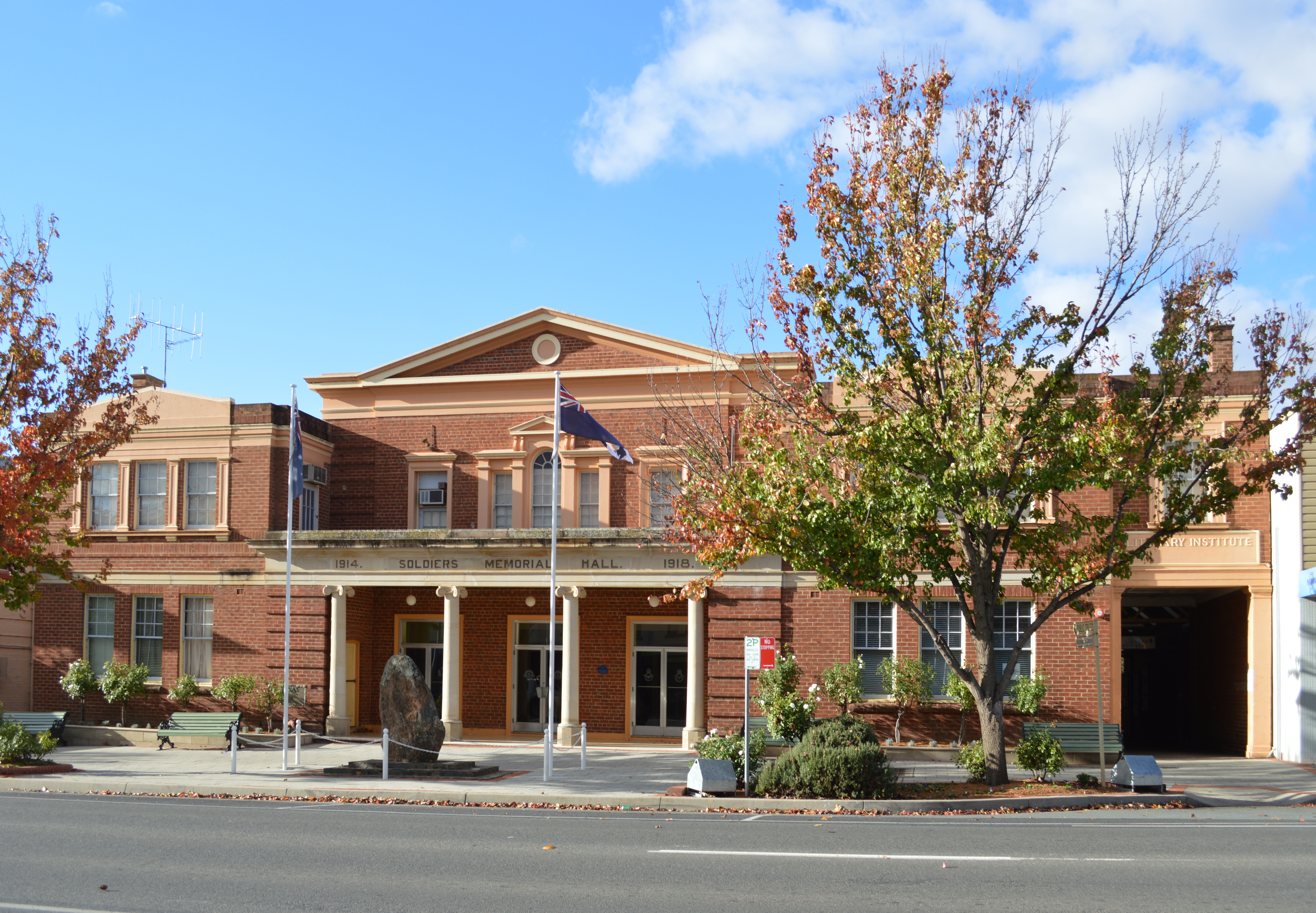
Soldiers Memorial Hall

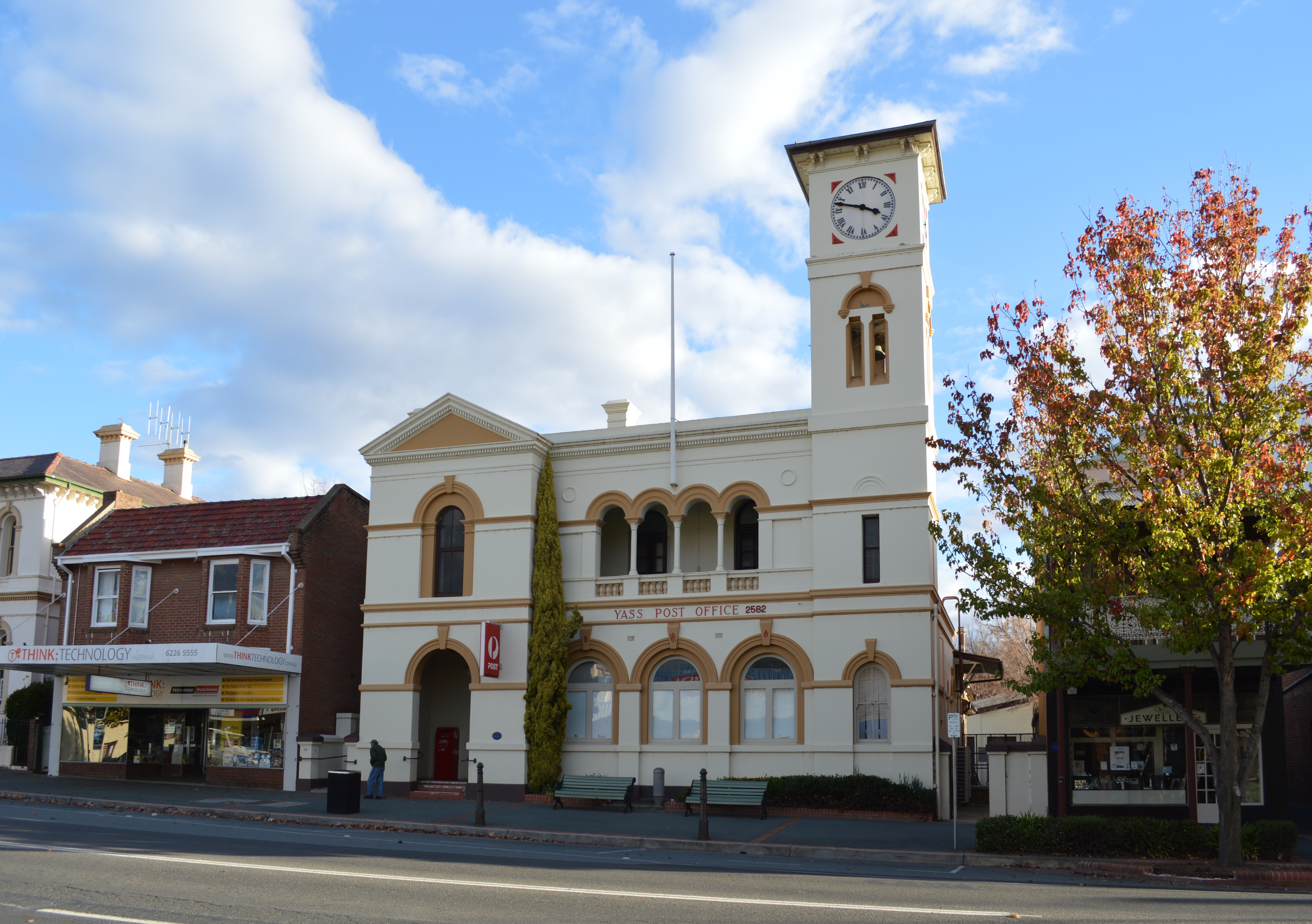
Post Office

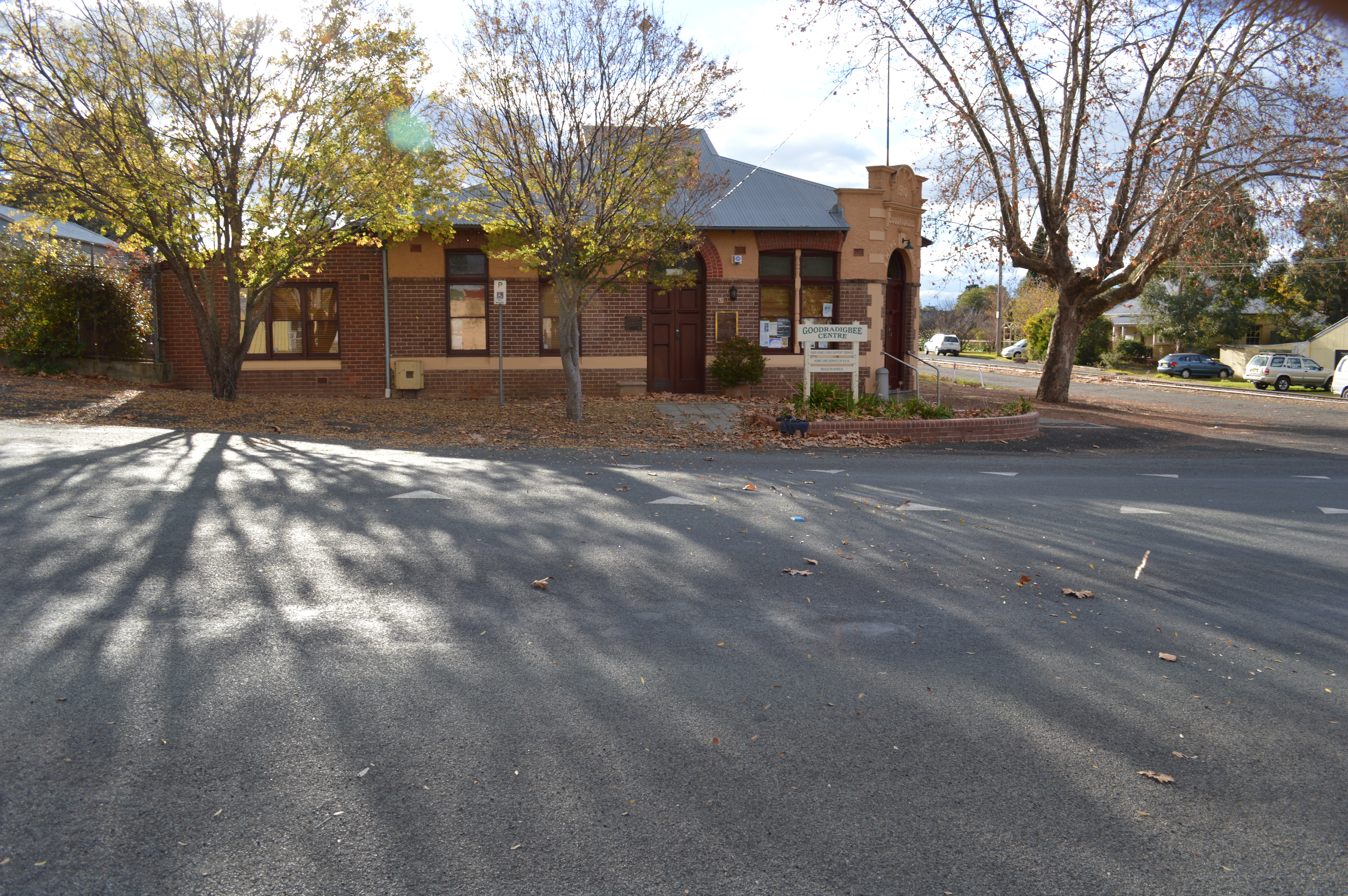
Goodradigbee Shire Chambers
