= Currawong Workers' Holiday Camp =

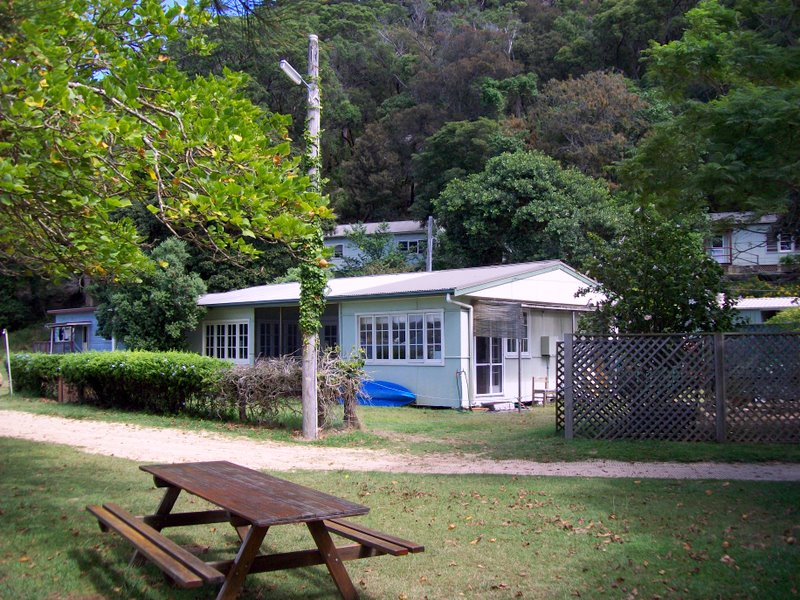
- Cabins at Currawong Beach

- Location within New South Wales Location within Australia
- 33.5953°S 151.2976°E
- Location: Currawong Beach, New South Wales, Australia

History
- Built: 1950–

Site notes
- Architect(s): Various including Van Dyke Brothers; Hudsen's Homes; vernacular
- Owner: NSW Trade & Investment – Crown land

New South Wales Heritage Register
- Official name: Currawong Workers' Holiday Camp; Little Mackerel; Labor Council's Holiday Resort; Unions NSW; Currawong Holiday Cottages; Midholme; Coaster's Retreat
- Type: State heritage (landscape)
- Designated: 12 May 2009
- Reference no.: 1784
- Type: Historic Landscape
- Category: Landscape - Cultural
- Builders: Various

The Currawong Workers' Holiday Camp is a heritage-listed former farm and now workers' holiday camp located at Currawong Beach, New South Wales, Australia. It was designed by various parties including the Van Dyke Brothers, Hudsen's Homes and built in 1950. The property is also known as Little Mackerel, Labor Council's Holiday Resort, Unions NSW Currawong Holiday Cottages, and Midholme and Coaster's Retreat. The property is Crown land and owned by the Government of New South Wales. The property was added to the New South Wales State Heritage Register on 12 May 2009.

== History ==
Aboriginal land

It is estimated that Aboriginal people have lived in the Sydney area for at least 40,000 years. The Pittwater area was originally the traditional lands of the Garigal and Cannagal peoples, who were part of the Guringai language group. They had a strong relationship with the water, the coast providing them with an abundant food supply. Throughout Pittwater, especially Ku-ring-gai Chase National Park, there are many Aboriginal sites (although none have been identified as yet within the Currawong curtilage) .

First contact

In early March 1788, soon after arriving with the First Fleet's convict settlement, Governor Arthur Phillip explored the southern arm of Broken Bay in search of suitable land to farm. Phillip described it as 'the finest piece of water which I ever saw' and gave it the name "Pitt Water" in honour of William Pitt the Younger, the Prime Minister of Great Britain at the time.

Jim Macken writes that Phillip's party met "friendly Aborigines" on the western foreshores of Pittwater: "It was here that Phillip made the first contact with the Guringai people, having met an old man and a young boy who showed the crews how to light a fire despite the rain, and where they could camp in a cave to keep dry". Although contact between the local Aboriginal community and early European explorers was initially civil, "European settlement in 1788 brought disaster for the Guringai. Between April 1789 and 1790 many Guringai died of diseases, to which they had no immunity, such as smallpox, and measles. Most of those who survived moved away from the coast as Europeans invaded their territory competing for food and territory"

Farming at Currawong

Only small pockets of land in Pittwater were initially found to be suitable for agriculture although Aboriginal shell middens in the Pittwater region were quickly raided to make the lime required for mortar used in building (Pittwater Council SHR nomination, 2005).

Land at Little Mackerel Beach was first granted in 1836 to Martin Burke. Although no improvements had been made, William Booth had apparently previously farmed the grant of 40 hectares (100 acres), which consisted of Portion 10, initially called Little Mackerel Beach and now known as Currawong, and Portion 9, the adjoining area to the north still known as Great Mackerel Beach). Burke leased the 16 hectares (40 acres) that included Little Mackerel Beach to Patrick Flynn. According to Honorah Collins, a long-term resident of the area in the 1880s, Patrick Flynn lived at Little Mackerel Beach between 1850 and 1854. The section then passed to Cornelius Sheehan who leased it to various people. Although he did not live at Little Mackerel Beach, following Sheehan's death in 1864, his widow lived at the property until 1871 when the land was transferred to Joseph Starr, a mariner of Sydney. In 1872, the Wilson family purchased the land from Joseph Starr. They continued to live there until the death of Mr Wilson in 1890. The Wilson's daughter, Nancy married John Shepherd Mulford in 1895 and moved to the house at Little Mackerel Beach in 1895.

In 1908, Mrs Sarah Wilson sold the Little Mackerel Beach land to her son-in-law, John Sanderson, who then sold it to Dr Beernhard Stiles of Newtown two years later. By that time the property was known as Currawong. Dr Stiles and his family lived in the homestead for several years until it burnt down, then built Midholme a little to the northeast of the original farmhouse. The Stiles family kept turkeys and cows and supplied fresh milk, butter, eggs and groceries to residents of Great Mackerel Beach. By the late 1930s, three freehold allotments had been subdivided from the Stiles' farm. During that period there were three houses at Little Mackerel Beach: Southend near the present wharf, Northend near the north side of the creek occupied by Hector Forsayth, and Midholme. Northend and Midholme were both on Stiles property.

Bernard Stiles, who was raised at Currawong in the early 1900s recalled the natural beauties of the place:

Regarding the flora and fauna I feel I should mention one bird, namely the Lyre Bird at Little Mackerel. These glorious birds were sheer delight to listen to in the morning, imitating every other bird in the bush, even the putt-putt of a motor boat or a man chopping wood was quite distinct. Koala bears and wallabies were also plentiful. Some of the wildflowers that grew on Little Mackerel and up on the Kuringai Plateau where the West Head Road now carries many sightseers are the many species of boronia, Christmas bush, flannel flowers, waratahs, Christmas bells and in one particular spot is a swampy patch that grows a very rare miniature native rose. Near this spot is the high knob where one can look west and see the Hawkesbury ridge and from the same spot look in the opposite direction and see the whole of Pittwater, Barrenjoey, Lion Island and Palm Beach, truly a unique view.'

— Bernard Stiles

All of the land at Little Mackerel Beach was sold to the Port Jackson & Manly Steamship Company between 1942 and 1944. The Company planned to construct a picnic ground and shark-proof enclosure at Little Mackerel Beach as part of its larger tourism ventures. Those plans were never carried out. By the late 1940s the Port Jackson and Manly Steamship Company had suffered an economic downturn and was forced to sell off many of its assets, including its holding at Little Mackerel Beach. The company's legacy there was modest and included the construction of a timber sea wall to mitigate beach erosion, and the erection of a small cottage near Midholme. This is now called Canning Cottage after Charles Canning, the company's caretaker who came to live there after initially supervising maintenance from Great Mackerel Beach. An undated plan of Little Mackerel Beach, probably from the late 1940s, shows the four residences, some outbuildings, a tennis court and a cultivation paddock on the banks of the creek. Photographs in the company's archives from about the same time show fencing and a row of small sheds, possibly chicken coops.

The Holiday Camp Movement

'The idea of affordable and improving holidays in natural surrounds took off after the Great War following the lead of camping, bushwalking, amateur fishing and national park movements. In the 1930s annual workers camps, some as big as temporary towns (often using ex-Army bell tents and bush mess facilities) were popular. YMCA camps, an American import, began in the late 1920s and the National Fitness Movement, a Canadian concept, took off from 1940 when volunteers built a camp at Patonga on Pittwater.'. There was also the example of the Eureka Youth League (EYL) camps in Victoria and NSW, one of the youth movements associated with left-wing unions and the Communist Party of Australia.

The development of purpose built "resorts" by trade unions increased substantially after World War II. Due to the critical shortage of accommodation after the war, many holiday homes were let for permanent rental and demand put such places out of the reach of the average worker. Changes to labour legislation at this time also contributed. The Labor Government introduced two weeks annual leave in 1944 and a 40-hour week in 1947. James Kenny, assistant secretary of the Labor Council of New South Wales advocated that families should be able to holiday with their families in affordable accommodation and he put to the Labor Council that a holiday camp should be established. Not all agreed that this was entirely the motive and Jim Hagan, University of Wollongong Professorial Fellow and historian believes that the unions considered that by uniting people with a common cause, loyalty to the Labor movement was reinforced.

Holder continues: 'By the mid-1940s the progressive social programs of a number of unions included camps and worker's health (following the lead of British coal mining unions). The incentive in Australia came in the form of crown leases or crown grants by the State and federal governments. The NSW Minister for Land, Bill Sheahan, dedicated land at Wamberal Lagoon north of Terrigal and at Lake Munmorah near Newcastle amongst other sites. The federal government offered unions long leases on former Defence land at Sussex Inlet. The Australian Railways Union (ARU) rejected Munmorah in favour of a lease at Sussex Inlet where it established a camp in 1948. In 1948 Premier James McGirr had unveiled the "ARU Camp" at Sussex Inlet, for the Australian Railway Union. This, he boasted, was the "First Australian Trade Union Owned and Controlled Holiday Camp". Many, who had never seen the sea, would now have the opportunity to enjoy a holiday by the sea. The Newcastle Trades Hall Council leased land at Barrington Tops for a holiday camp during the 1950s but it remained undeveloped and the land reverted to Barrington Tops National Park' (quoted in Design Plus, 2003) The Miners' Federation had Bushy Tail Caravan Park in the Shoalhaven (c. 1940) and the Seamen's Union had a camp at Springwood in the 1950s. In 1949 the Federation of Combined Workers Clubs was formed and its Fingal Bay resort was an unplanned outcome of the popularity of an annual fishing competition organised by the Federation in the 1950s. This led to the lease of a couple of hectares of land at Fingal Bay from the government and eventually expansion of the Federation camps to Urunga and Sussex Inlet.

Worker's holiday cabins were mostly informal groups of cabins in a pleasant environment. Many were associated with amateur fishing camps and clubs, a popular working class activity, and established around large industrial centres such as Newcastle and Wollongong.

Labor Council's acquisition of Currawong

J. D. (Jim) Kenny was a prominent NSW unionist, who had risen from being Secretary of the NSW Glass Workers' Union to being Assistant Secretary of the Labor Council from 1946 until 1958, when he became Secretary of the Labor Council, a position he held until his death in 1967. From 1948 he was a Member of the NSW Legislative Council, and he also held the position of Senior Vice-president of the ACTU. Kenny had begun to explore the possibility of providing low-cost holiday accommodation for union members since their two-week paid annual leave was introduced in 1944. After the end of World War II, Kenny approached the State and federal governments to grant a suitable site. Premier J. J. McGirr was interested enough in the proposition to gather information on holiday camps for the Labor Council when he was overseas. Although the government offered land at Wamberal Lagoon, north of Terrigal and Lake Munmorah near Wyong, the Council did not proceed with either site for reasons unknown. Instead Kenny negotiated the purchase of the Currawong estate from the Port Jackson & Manly Steamship Co Ltd for A£10,000. Kenny was also a board member of the steamship company and must have been the key facilitator of the property transaction. The purchase was financed by the Labor Council selling land owned at Frenchs Forest, where its 2KY radio transmitter had been located before being moved to Homebush.

Kenny had ambitious plans for Currawong, arguing that 'there is not enough holiday accommodation within a wage earner's means'. A framed colour rendering of a c. 1950 development proposal held by the Labor Council makes Currawong look like a Butlin's Holiday Camp, and Butlin's camps were expanding in the UK at about this same time The Sunday Herald (27 November 1949) reported that Currawong would have accommodation for 500. There would be a pool, tennis courts, dining hall and a dance hall, an outdoor auditorium, adults' and children's swimming pools, an oval with cricket pitch and 75 yard running track, a club house, children's playground, bowling green, four tennis courts, two basketball or paddle tennis courts and a handball court transaction. However Kenny explicitly said 'We don't intend to provide the rather regimented amusements that are popular in English camps' (27 November 1949).

Development of Currawong Holiday Camp

Kenny worked tirelessly to develop Currawong, relying on the labour of colleagues, friends and family. Due to the deprivations arising from the war, development of the camp was initially reliant on donated building materials and the volunteer labour of unionists. The State and federal governments were working together to establish Postwar Reconstruction and housing programs in response to the critical shortages, leading to the development of labour saving construction methods and the industrial manufacture of cost effective building materials. This new approach and the resource constraints of that historical period are embodied in the modest 1950s fibro cabins.

In 1949 the first of ten cabins to be built over the next four years was completed. This first cabin became known as Kenny's Cabin, later also known as Kenny's Cottage, Jim and Bess Kenny's Cabin, Blue Cottage and, from 1993, Blue Tongue. The materials to build Kenny's Cabin were donated by the building materials supplier George Hudson and Sons. Hudsons was one of several companies at the time supplying the popular "ready cut" standard building components, which addressed the growing owner/builder market. Kenny's Cabin is similar in some ways to one of Hudsons' standard designs, "the Pittwater", which was marketed from about 1950. Kenny's Cabin had timber flooring except for the kitchen and bathroom, which had concrete floors. It had a stone-paved courtyard at the rear, an area created in 1920 when clay was cut out to build the tennis court. This was the cottage where the Wran family stayed during the period Neville Wran was Premier of New South Wales. The next cabin to be constructed was the Games Room. It housed Mrs Kenny's piano for many years and was the central meeting place for children. At night it was a focus for the communal camp sing-along and night time game of spot light.

Both Kenny's Cabin and the Games Room are representative of the simplest form of holiday cottage of "Ready Cut" homes produced by Hudsons, which had first produced their kit-homes in 1916. Although initially popular as weekenders the Hudsons became popular with the owner-builder during the 1950s. Hudson's produced a simple two-room cottage featuring central door flanked by windows either side, but with gabled roof, from as early as 1929. The name of the design changed with the years, being known as "The Woy Woy" in the late 1920s and "The Berowra" by 1931. The sharply raked roof, as featured in "The Pittwater", was a post-World War II product that Robin Boyd referred to in 'Australia's Home' (1952) as "The Contemporaire".

The next eight cabins to be built were positioned in a curving single line following the escarpment along the high ground above Kenny's Cabin. The layout of the cabins follows that of the original concept plan of the camp. Holder states that this layout was influenced by that of the YMCA Camp Manyung at Mornington in Victoria. Camp Manyung, established in the late 1920s. Camp Manyung was designed by Eric Nicholls, partner of Walter Burley Griffin during the latter's time in Australia.

The Currawong cabins No. 1 (Kookaburra) and Cabin No. 3 (Platypus) were built to plans specifically adapted for the NSW Labor Camp at Currawong by Vandyke Brothers Pty Ltd in 1950. They were based on Vandyke Brother's "Sectionit" prefabricated system of construction and featured the use of pre-assembled asbestos cement sheet (fibro) sandwich panels that could be easily erected on the required site, guaranteeing efficient and cost effective construction. In correspondence to Jim Kenny, then the President of the NSW Labor Council, in April and May 1950, Vandyke Brothers Pty Ltd pointed out that the design of the roof of the cabins had been modified from the original sketch. The design had been changed from a hip end to a gable so that prefabricated roof trusses could be used, making erection of the roof simpler. The Pier Plan also notes that Malthoid on a wooden floor had been specified for the wet areas but should that not be acceptable to Council, brickwork would need to be provided as shown. The plan of the cabin was simple with a large living area the width of the cabin at one end and bedroom at the other end. There was a Kitchen and Bathroom between and the Kitchen was partially open to the Living Room, a reasonably new concept at the time. Each cabin had a small covered porch on the side at the entrance. Charles Vandyke recalled the special order for Currawong being sent on a pontoon across Pittwater. The factory foreman, Snowy Popperwell, travelled with the components to show volunteers, members of a building union, how to assemble them.

In 1953 the remaining six cabins, Goanna, Magpie, Lorikeet, Wallaby, Possum and Echidna (cabin numbers 2, 4, 5, 6, 7 & 8) were built. While these are similar in concept to the Vandyke cabins and appear to be copies, their construction methods and detail are quite different. Like the Vandykes, these later cabins had gable roofs, fibro panelled walls, double hung windows, concrete piers and awning covered entrance doors but they were fully assembled on site from pre-cut materials and manufactured components, not integrated units like the Vandykes. These cabins were based on a steel framed system, said to be painted red, but the origin of the cabin's manufacture is not known. The floor framing is timber and the bathrooms have concrete floors. The cabins were initially thought to have been built from materials donated by building supplier George Hudson and Sons and used Hudson's trade name "Ready Cut" standard materials. The detail, such as mouldings, vents and architraves would suggest they were either standard Hudsons or James Hardie products. The latter seems the more likely as Hardies manufactured and promoted fibre cement products exclusively at this time. Also the architraves of the Currawong cabins are similar to those manufactured by James Hardie. Holder believes that they may be pre-fabrication prototypes purchased at cost from the Commonwealth Experimental Building Station at Ryde. Given the shortage of steel in Australia at the time and considering the Labor Council's close connection with government housing schemes, it is not unlikely that they were surplus stock.

The Vandyke Brothers

The three eldest Vandyke brothers arrived in Australia from Holland in 1913. By 1923 they had established the building and contracting firm Vandyke Brothers and by 1926 had published their first catalogue of standard brick home designs. During the years of the economic Depression in the 1930s business slowed and Christopher Vandyke took the opportunity to develop his ideas for a standard home. In 1936 he patented a system of prefabrication known as the "Sectionit". It consisted of timber framed sandwich panels lined with asbestos cement sheets (fibro). The panels came to site as plain sheets or with windows and doors already assembled within. The prototype was displayed at the Sydney Royal Easter Show and the 1937 Sectionit catalogue quoted costs at £168-499. The sections were keyed together with patented Tongue and Groove and the windows were frameless, with glazing placed in pre-grooved slots. The efficiency achieved by using a standard design provided a cheaper home.

In 1938 Vandyke Brothers were engaged by the government to build homes for munitions workers at the Lithgow Small Arms Factory. The prototype was known as The Duration House. World War II was imminent and all manufacturing was controlled and directed to the war effort. The Duration House, based on the Sectionit system and design, promised economy and efficient construction time at a cost of about 350 pounds each. Despite this, the use of handicraft methods of manufacture was used in preference to machine production, reducing overall economy.

Vandyke Brothers later built army barracks and near the end of the war built housing for service personnel. To assist with the speed at which the Vandyke brothers could produce their houses, the Department of Defence made the defunct munitions factory at Villawood available to them. Vandyke Brothers were given an order for 1,000 homes and during the peak of production were producing 30 homes per week at the Villawood factory. After the War the Sectionit system was used for a variety of applications including temporary premises for the Commonwealth Bank at Campbelltown, an unemployment office at Mascot and on a larger scale, barracks for Snowy Mountains Scheme workers at Cooma. In the mid-50s the government asked Vandyke Brothers to vacate the premises at Villawood. The factory was closed in 1957 and the brothers decided to retire. Christopher was involved with the government for a short time afterwards, in an advisory role in relation to importation of prefabricated units from overseas.

Chris Vandyke was a passionate architectural modernist who was close to Jim McGirr (NSW Premier) and Clive Evatt (Minister for Housing) and Sydney modernists such as photographer Max Dupain (who photographed his projects). Chris Vandyke accompanied Premier McGirr on a research trip abroad in 1946 and again in 1948 visiting building research centres in the UK and the United States of America. It was on advice from McGirr that Kenny approached Vandyke to design the Currawong cabins or "Currawong Chalets" as they were referred to.

Memories of Currawong

Many people visited Currawong on a regular basis and have long and happy memories of times spent there. A rich oral history of the Pittwater region has been gathered, mostly in relation to people's collective memories of travelling to the many special places in the vicinity. Extensive oral and photographic records provide evidence to this and enhance the long term understanding of the importance of Currawong to many people. Some oral histories have been reproduced in the publication "The Halcyon Days of Summer on Pittwater" (1991) by Audrey Sheperd. A collection of oral histories about Currawong are kept in the Local Studies Collection at Mona Vale Library, including interviews with Bernard Stiles, Flora Webster, the Wells family (who had been visiting Currawong since the mid-1950s), those associated with the trade union movement, a former manager at Currawong and the current caretaker, Barry Kirkman. Currawong also features in the Labor Council Oral History Project. The Carey family were staying in Northend the night it collapsed and the daughter Gabrielle Carey included descriptions of Currawong in her novel "Puberty Blues", which she co-authored with Kathy Lette in 1979. A documentary on the maritime communities of Pittwater, "The Water Dwellers", made by the Australian Commonwealth Film unit in 1967 included reference to Currawong.

Many families now visiting Currawong are third generation. A plethora of letters and photographs were submitted in 1999 to the National Trust. One of the comments representing a widespread sentiment come from Siobhan Bryson whose extended family have been visiting Currawong for over 36 years. She stated: "it is a place which is safe for children, far from the usual commercial pressures of holiday resorts, full of bird and animal life, immersed in the ancient spirituality of the original custodians of the land, and strongly connected to the historical struggle for workers rights in NSW". Marianne Lloyd stated: "1950s Australia captured and frozen within this little beach community. . . Holidays at Currawong are still about families and take you back to a time of firecrackers and a time when you knew all of your neighbours. Where children were safe outside in the evenings and parents had time to listen and be heard".

Newspaper columnist Adele Horin has also described the appeal of Currawong in the following terms: 'It's a Currawong ritual. Nightly at the Pittwater holiday retreat, the children take torches, gather on the big lawn by the dilapidated tennis court and play spotlight under the stars. There's often a sizable gang, aged five to 13, unafraid of the dark, dashing in and out of the trees in this night version of hide and seek. 'But what makes the spectacle remarkable is the absence of adults. There is no need at Currawong for parents to hover in the role of chaperone. Parents are out of sight, beyond the trees, up the hill, sipping beer on the verandas of fibro cottages as the squeals of delight float up to them. At Currawong, kids rule. Even at night . . . 'For those unfamiliar with Currawong, it can best be described by telling you what it doesn't have - no roads, no cars, no shops, no TV, no cinema, no restaurant, no amenities really at all, except the tennis court, the jetty for fishing, and a squishy golf course of sorts. There are nine fibro cottages (no inside toilet) and a historic homestead. Unionists get priority, and the rents are reasonable. And as you gaze across Pittwater at the millionaires' row of Palm Beach, you think Australia is the best country in the world. 'And for primary school-aged children, whose suburban lives are so circumscribed, it is heaven on a stick. No camping ground we've been to, no beachside holiday cottage, has provided the children with the same experience of independence, safety and community.' (Sydney Morning Herald 8/5/1999, p. 45)

A former manager at Currawong offered this memory of the place: 'A very small child once urged my wife and me to "Come and see the gods". He was very insistent so we accompanied him to the creek that runs through the property. Excitedly he said "Look at them - can you see them". Floating on the creek were spiky grass balls being gently driven in different directions by the breeze. We rather unconvincingly said "Oh yes we see them". The little boy who was only about four years old looked disappointed and said "Well they are not really gods - they're more like symbols of God". I have never forgotten that moment. Currawong is a very special spiritual kind of place that deserves to be retained for all people.'

=== Recent history ===
Currawong has continued to be owned by the Labor Council of NSW (now Unions NSW) and has been used continuously as holiday accommodation for workers. Various additions and modifications have been undertaken over the last 50 years, however, most of the original cabins remain, along with one of the early farmhouses.

On 20 December 1976 Warringah Shire Council resolved not to approve any further subdivision of land on the western shores of Pittwater where access is by water only. The Labor Council and the development Company Civil & Civic lodged a subdivision application for the Currawong site in July 1977. Warringah Shire Council advised in August 1977 that the application be refused. One of the main reasons given was that: "As a matter of policy in the public interest, that any further subdivision of land situated generally on the western shores of Pittwater where access is by water only, be not approved".

In response to this refusal, the Labor Council commissioned Civil & Civic to prepare an Environmental Impact Study covering the areas indicated by Council as their grounds for rejection of the subdivision proposal. A hearing before the Local Government Appeals Tribunal was set down for 27–28 February 1978. During preparation of the EIS, Civil & Civic's consulting engineers, Longworth and McKenzie prepared a geotechnical report that indicated that 80% of the Currawong site was unsuitable for residential development as a result of land instability problems. A further report by engineers Coffey & Partners contradicted the Longworth & McKenzie report in some respects but both reports highlighted the need for further investigation of geotechnical matters.

In a letter dated 4 April 1978 the then NSW Premier, Neville Wran advised the Labor Council that it was the Government's longstanding policy that Currawong and other "in-holdings" on the western shores of Pittwater should be incorporated into Ku-ring-gai Chase National Park, subject to the availability of funds for their purchase by the NPWS. The Premier further advised that, having regard to this policy and the controversy which arose in relation to the Labor Council's 1977 subdivision proposal for Currawong, he had instructed his colleague the Minister for Lands to enter into negotiations for the purchase of the property. These arrangements for the disposal of the Currawong Property to the NPWS did not eventuate.

In 1986 architects Brewster Murray Pty Ltd were engaged by the Labor Council to prepare plans to develop further accommodation and facilities at Currawong. On 12 May 1987, Warringah Shire Council resolved that Currawong be added to Ku-ring-gai Chase National Park. The Council advised the Labor Council that their DA was again refused.

After the refusal, another proposal was developed and expressions of interest were called from major development companies and financial institutions. In 1989 the development company CRI lodged the successful expression of interest. However some unionists were opposed to major redevelopment of the site. Among their objections were the perceived need to maintain Currawong as a holiday resort for "people of average income". A "Friends of Currawong" group was formed to "save the workers" paradise'.

In response to the concern of Warringah Shire Council that the site was unlikely to be able to cope with the effluent disposal demands of the CRI development, Nielsen Lord Associates prepared a report to the NSW Labor Council which addressed issues of rising sea water, wave action and flooding to Currawong.

In February 1992, lnsite Architecture and Design put a proposal to the Labor Council for a low scale development at Currawong comprising timber accommodation units with corrugated iron roofs. This proposal did not proceed.

In May 1992, Surveyors and Engineers, Souter Jeffrey identified development constraints associated with their proposal to develop the Currawong Club, a proposed junior sail training establishment at Little Mackerel Beach. The major constraints identified in their report were as follows:

- Environmental sensitivity of the site
- Adverse community reaction
- Limited areas available suitable for building due to topographic features (escarpment and floodplain covers the site)
- High reticulation costs for the provision of roads, landfill, drainage, sewerage, water and power
- Heritage listing of Midholme
- Section 94 contributions and dedication of the majority of land to Pittwater Council and/or National Parks
- Market value of lots due to isolation
- Relative exposure of the site to weather compared to nearby sheltered anchorages in Coasters Retreat.

Later in 1992 the Labor Council agreed to a restoration plan instead of redevelopment, the $56,000 cost of repairs being met by a levy on each of the State's unionists. A significant amount of voluntary labour was also contributed. In a media release dated 4 December 1992 the Labor Council of NSW announced the forthcoming reopening of Currawong after refurbishment and renovation: 'We are keen to make Currawong a success and look forward to further improvements, including upgrading the tennis court and six hole practice golf course . . . Unions, large and small businesses, trades people and an army of well-wishing volunteers have seen Currawong turned around. the Labor Council is determined to ensure the ongoing financial and operational success of the Pittwater "Workers" Paradise'!. . . For years, workers and their families have enjoyed an affordable holiday at Currawong. This ideally situated resort will now offer that same opportunity to union members for years to come'.

Interest in redeveloping Currawong emerged again in 1999. Media reports stated that the Labor Council under then Secretary Michael Costa had been negotiating over a 99-year lease to Transcendental Meditation Guru Maharishi Mahesh Yogi for a $5 million Executive Stress Resort. Negotiations fell through. Further media reports stated that the Labor Council had been negotiating with the company Corporate Renaissance with a view to developing a retreat centre at Currawong on a long-term lease basis. This proposal sparked concern by local residents and the founding of the Friends of Currawong group. It did not proceed.

The debate was noted by historian Richard White in his book, "On Holidays" (2000) which described it as being "between those who wanted the complex replaced by a luxury new age resort, and those who mounted a self-consciously nostalgic argument in favour of the cabins" retro-chic heritage values, recognising the extent to which the notion of a cheap holiday was under siege.'

In 2006 the Labour Council, by now known as Unions NSW and headed by Secretary John Robertson, announced plans to sell Currawong, leading to further public debate.

In 2007("late last year" (2010) (Manly Daily 22 March 2011) Unions NSW sold Currawong to Eco Villages P/L for $15m. Eco Villages P/L's plans to redevelop the property with 25 new residences were refused by the then Minister for Planning, Kristina Keneally, on 28 April 2009 after a previous Planning Minister, Frank Sartor had set up and heard from an Independent Heritage Advisory Panel and extensive public submissions opposing the proposal. A revised proposal for 12 new houses on the site was lodged in September 2010 and a deemed refusal appeal lodged in the NSW Land & Environment Court in December 2010.

In March 2011 the NSW Land & Property Management Authority purchased the site from Eco Villages P/L for $12.2m to establish a new State Park(Sydney Morning Herald, 22 March 2011, abridged).

Heritage listings In April 1989, DC Research, economic and social geographers, prepared on behalf of the Labor Council a submission to Warringah Shire Council with respect to the identification in the Barrenjoey Peninsula and Pittwater Heritage Study of items B105 (Midholme) and A8 (site of Northend), Little Mackerel Beach, as items of local environmental heritage. Midholme was included as a heritage item in Warringah Council's Local Environmental Plan.

On 28 February 2001, the National Trust listed "Little Mackerel Beach, Currawong" on their non-statutory register.

Currawong was included in the heritage schedule of a draft Local Environmental Plan which was forwarded by Pittwater City Council to the Minister for gazettal in 1999, but never eventuated. In 2005 Pittwater City Council prepared another draft LEP for Heritage Conservation which listed Currawong in the heritage schedule as a Heritage Conservation Area of State significance (Draft Amdt. 81 to Pittwater LEP 1993 ). This LEP has not yet been gazetted.

A nomination to list Currawong on the State Heritage Register was submitted to the Heritage Council 1999, with a heritage assessment by Musecape & Beaver that well articulated its landscape values. This was sent back to Council with a request for further information about Currawong's comparative heritage values as a workers' holiday camp in a statewide context. A second New South Wales State Heritage Register nomination was submitted by Pittwater Council in 2003, however comparative information was still required in order to assess its significance in a statewide context. A further study of Currawong's heritage values by Design Plus was also commissioned by the Friends of Currawong in 2003. The Heritage branch completed its own comparative study of Currawong in 2008, concluding that the site was likely to be of State heritage significance. This finding was endorsed by the NSW Heritage Council and a Ministerial Review Panel. Currawong was listed on the State Heritage Register on 12 May 2009.

Comparative analysis of holiday camps in NSW

The provision of inexpensive holiday units in seaside locations for members has been a benefit offered by many unions in NSW since the 1950s. However these units tend to be small-scale in their scope and without shared facilities, located in towns or other built-up locations, and of more recent fabric than Currawong. The conservation plan for the Eureka Youth League's "Camp Eureka", which is listed on the Victorian Heritage Register, states that 'Camp Eureka is one of only two "workers" holiday camps' from the 1940s and 50s remaining in their original form; the other being Camp Currawong at Little Mackerel Beach on Pittwater outside Sydney'. Currawong is rare and probably unique for having operated as a union camp continuously for 60 years, with little modification. Even Camp Eureka was abandoned for a few years in the early 1970s and has been undergoing restoration in recent years (under Burra Charter principles).

The Minto Bush Camp established by the Communist Party of Australia (CPA), near Campbelltown on the south-western outskirts of Sydney, is the only other relatively intact mid-twentieth century workers' holiday campsite remaining in NSW. It was given to Tranby Aboriginal College in the 1990s when the CPA disbanded but its several shed-like dormitories and facility buildings dating from the 1950s and 1960s are still available for use as a camping area (and Buddhist retreat). While this camp (along with Camp Eureka in Victoria) may have represented the left compared to Currawong as the right wing of the postwar international labour movement, they all symbolise a shared optimism from the era that workers could create a new world which cut across class and ethnicity. The Minto Bush Camp differs from Currawong in being located in bushland some distance from the sea, having dorminatory-style accommodation rather than catering for families, and being relatively unknown because of its association with a radical political grouping rather than the mainstream union movement.

The major comparable early union-based holiday camp was the Australian Railways Union (ARU) Camp which was opened with some fanfare, and before Currawong, by Premier McGirr in 1948. It is technically located in the ACT, being on Jarvis Bay Territory land, although it is just across the inlet from the Shoalhaven Council town of Sussex Inlet. Now known as the New Generation Holiday Camp, it is still union-run (now by the Rail Bus and Tram Union) but was entirely refurbished with new cabins in the 1980s. Similarly the NSW branch of Liquor, Hospitality and Miscellaneous Workers Union has had a holiday camp at Fingal Bay since the 1950s, however the skillion-roofed cabins were replaced in 1990 during an expansion of the site to 60 cabins. The Electrical Trades holiday camp at Nambucca Heads now just offers two contemporary mobile-home style cabins for rent. The communist-affiliated Eureka Youth League operated a bush camp in Springwood in the Blue Mountains in the 1930s and 1940s, which had a few slab huts and a swimming pool adapted from an old dam. The site was given to the Seaman's Union when the EYL became concerned that its assets might be confiscated as part of the 1950s repression of the Communist Party; the Seaman's Union has since sold the property for suburban subdivision. A site at Stanwell Tops, privately owned by a "Mr Halloran", was popular with railway workers in the 1930s, with huts being built c.1935, but most of these burned down in 1961 and the rest were soon removed (Ashley, 1992). The Canberra Tradesmen's Union Club has groups of holiday units in ten locations in NSW (and more in Queensland and Victoria) but the units in Sussex Inlet and Forster are the only ones of a similar vintage to Currawong. While they are modest, intact and for the moment still in their original use, they are both positioned in a strip on a suburban block in town and are more like an apartment block than a holiday camp; moreover both sets of units are soon to be sold. The Miner's Federation (now CFMEU) Bushy Tail camp at Wrights Beach on St George's Basin, in the Shoalhaven Council area, has operated largely as a caravan park since the 1940s with just one caretaker's cottage.

The Young Men's Christian Association (YMCA) and the National Fitness movement also saw the development of seaside holiday camps for working people in NSW from the 1930s and 1940s. However, there are few remnants of early fabric in the remaining sites. The original YMCA camp site at Patonga became the first National Fitness Centre in the southern hemisphere when it was formally established in 1941. It is still a holiday camp site, now run by the NSW Department of Sport & Recreation and called Broken Bay Sports & Recreation but it contains little built fabric from the 1940s era and no cabins. Of the dozen or so holiday camp sites run by this agency, only the Kosciuzsko site and the Point Wollstonecroft site (north of Wyong) contain mid-twentieth century fabric cabins. The Kosciuzsko cabins were built as workers' accommodation for the Snowy Mountains Scheme and are dissimilar to Currawong in design, layout and historical significance. The Point Wollstonecroft site retains a group of four timber cabins dating from the early 1950s which like Currawong were probably built as holiday accommodation, and are located near the sea; however as a small part of a larger contemporary fitness centre, they retain little of Currawong's backwater holiday ambience.

Another genre of cabins are the weekender huts which were jerry-built on or near national park land from the 1920s and 1930s (for example at Bulgo, South Era, Burning Palms, Garie and Bonnie Vale in the Royal National Park - see Ashley, 1992). While they are comparable with Currawong for their modest scale and location within a bushland setting by the sea, they differ because they tend to be older, more vernacular in style, more associated with particular families over long periods of time rather than rented to workers, and historically linked to depression-era housing rather than Postwar Reconstruction holidays for workers.

There are also many groups of modest, privately built, mid-twentieth century holiday cottages still to be found along the NSW coast, such as "The Springs" at Swan Haven, 'Don Hearn's cabins' at Cunjurong Point on Lake Conjola and the "Green Cabins" at HHyams Beach, all located in the Shoalhaven local government area. Investigating the extent and intactness of this possibly widespread genre of buildings in NSW was outside the scope of research for this assessment. Although physically similar, this genre lacks the public and organisational context of union-backing that enhances Currawong's heritage value.

In this overview Currawong is the most intact union-established mid-twentieth century holiday camp in NSW and probably Australia (Design Plus, 2003 supplemented with HO internet research). It also stands out for having been established by the NSW Labor Council, the peak representative body of unions in NSW.

== Description ==
The area known as Currawong is located on the western foreshores of Pittwater between Coasters Retreat and Great Mackerel Beach and on the eastern side of the Lamberton Peninsula. It has a total area of 19.7 hectares (49 acres). The eastern extent of the property is Currawong Beach, a gently sloping sandy beach. Currawong is surrounded by Ku-ring-gai Chase National Park to the west and south, and adjoined by private property associated with Great Mackerel Beach to the north. Currawong is not accessible by road but is served by a ferry from the Palm Beach Public Wharf.

The property falls within the Northern Beach Council local government area; having previously been located in the Pittwater Council, after it was transferred from the Warringah Shire in March 1992.

The property is within the Parish of Broken Bay, County of Cumberland and is identified in real property under four separate Certificates of Title:

- PT 10 DP 752017 – 19 hectares (47 acres)
- Lot 1 DIP 166328 – 0.6 hectares (1.5 acres)
- Lot4 DP 978424 – 0.08 hectares (0.20 acres)
- Lot 1 DP 337208 – 0.075 hectares (0.19 acres)

About one quarter of this historic property is proposed for State Heritage Register listing: part of PT 10 DP 752017 and all of Lot 1 DP 337208. See curtilage map of area proposed for SHR listing under "Images"

The majority of the 19.7-hectare (49-acre) site is natural bushland, on steeper slopes and escarpment areas. However, there is approximately 4 hectares (9.9 acres) of developed, flatter land adjoining the beach, which contains holiday cottages and other buildings which form the Unions NSW holiday camp facility. These facilities are all located on a generally flat triangular area of inter-tidal mudflat behind the beach, which has been filled and levelled over a long period of time. The flat area behind the beach is classified as being in the Warriewood Swamp Landscape group and the surrounding rocky escarpment is classified as Watagan Colluvial Soil Landscape group. This area is surrounded by heavily vegetated escarpment areas, in their natural state, which in turn adjoin land within Ku-ring-gai Chase National Park. Currawong Beach was formerly known as Little Mackerel Beach. The name Currawong Beach was registered by the Geographical Names Board of New South Wales in April 1984.

Unions NSW holiday camp facilities

These currently include nine holiday cabins, manager's cottage, maintenance shed, caretaker accommodation, Midholme (the original historic homestead), the TUTA conference centre, a tennis court, a six-hole golf course and a deepwater wharf:

Midholme homestead, c. 1916

Midholme is a single storey, timber framed bungalow with weatherboard cladding and wide veranda to three sides. The broken back roof is of slate with terracotta ridge and hip cladding. Internally, the house has a central common room entered from the northern front door. The kitchen is in a rear addition to the house. A bedroom is located on each corner of the house. The laundry is in the enclosed southwest corner of the veranda. The southeast corner.of the veranda is also enclosed. Midholme was repaired and repainted in 1993. At that time additional rooms were constructed to the rear of the house (National Trust Listing Card).

Believed to have been built around 1916, Midholme is a now a rare example of a farmhouse in the Pittwater region. Its wide verandas were originally semi-enclosed and the house was carefully positioned on the site to shelter from the southerly winds, the tidal beach and occasionally flooding creek. Built of timber frame with half weatherboard, half asbestos cement sheeting (fibro), it is perhaps one of the earliest uses of fibro in the district. Imported from around 1910, asbestos cement sheeting was not manufactured in Australia until around 1916. The Pittwater area generally is renowned for its early use of the material which was to become characteristic in the region due to its use in the construction of holiday houses

1950s Holiday Cottages

Eight holiday cottages extend in a row behind Caming Cottage and Midholme. Of these, the earliest is "Blue Tongue" (formerly Kenny's Cabin), built in 1950. "Blue Tongue" has rock-faced sandstone footings and front steps. It is clad in weatherboard with timber framed hopper, fixed windows and skillion roof of corrugated steel Kenny's Cabin had timber flooring except for the kitchen and bathroom, which had concrete floors. It had a stone-paved courtyard at the rear, an area created in 1920 when clay was cut out to build the tennis court.

The Games Room was the second built cabin, used for communal activities. It was similar in the design to Kenny's Cabin with a raked skillion roof and timber weatherboard cladding. It has a central door and windows either side although these are now aluminium sliding frames. It is set on a stone base, has a laundry at one end, a large opening on the north and is not lined inside. A shed similar in form to the Games Room but with fibro cladding was also built to the south-west of the Games Room. The workers cottages numbers 1 ('Kookaburra') and 3 ('Platypus') in the union holiday camp are examples of "Sectionit" prefabricated cabins especially designed for this site. The Sectionit prefabricated house system was developed by Christopher Vandyke in the 1930s to reduce production costs of the family home and was adopted by the government to provide fast and cost effective housing at the end of the Second World War. Vandyke's ideas were highly innovative for his time and displayed many modernist ideals. The Sectionit was a sophisticated prefabrication solution developed and successfully used in mid-twentieth century Australia. They are timber framed and originally had fibrous cement sheet cladding (National Trust listing card).

The Vandyke cabins at Currawong had corrugated iron clad gable roofs, in-situ concrete piers and locally quarried rock faced sandstone front steps. The panels of the Sectionit were 0.91-metre-wide (3 ft) by 2.7-metre-long (9 ft) and came as either a plain wall section, a door section or a window section that fitted over the wall plate. The windows came already installed in a panel section and only these panel sections had the three-hole ventilator. Sectionit came with built in Kitchens and wardrobes plumbing was pre-fitted and coupled on site. This reduced the need for on site labour reducing the cost of the building overall.

The remaining five cottages, Magpie, Lorikeet, Wallaby, Possum and Echidna were, built in 1952 using steel frames. They were prefabricated buildings donated to the Labor Council by the Hudson Timber Co (National Trust Listing Card). These are copies of the two Sectionit cabins but use standardised building materials, a product of the pursuit by the building industry at the time to provide cheap and labour efficient construction, through the use of proprietary products. The Vandyke cabins and the later cabins vary considerably in detail. The later cabins are completely fibro, the double hung windows have single sashes with a standard chamfered architrave across a grouping and the ventilators are metal grilles positioned on site. The Vandykes had factory drilled ventilation holes in the each window panel. The panels were assembled off site and the double hung windows with double sash, were separate units and integral to each panel. In detail, the Vandykes do not use half panels and even the design of the mouldings and fixings are carefully thought out.

All the cabins have undergone some minor modification though otherwise are considerably intact. While all the cabins had porches with an awning over the entry, these have all been slightly modified to extend or add on to the porch. The later cabins originally had pressed metal roofs, but some may have been replaced with some form of tile or shingle at a later stage. These were replaced with corrugated metal in 1992 due to storm damage.

All the cabins were initially painted blue, the colour of the donated paint. Cabin N0.1 Kookaburra, Cabin No.4, Magpie and Kenny's Cabin are still painted blue. They each had small fibro outhouses, rock faced stone walling and barbeques. Prior to the installation of electricity in 1967, Portagas was used for cooking stoves and kerosene fridges kept perishables. Behind or adjacent to each cabin was a water tank, stood on monolithic sandstone piers. Evidence of the piers can be seen but the tanks have been removed.

Manager's Cottage, 1990

The manager's cottage stands on the site of Southend. It replaced the earlier cottage that was burnt down in 1954. The Manager's cottage is a timber-framed building clad in fibrous cement sheeting with a corrugated steel gabled roof. It has casement windows on the front (eastern) elevation which are probably recycled (National Trust Listing Card).

TUTA Building, 1997

This conference facility was built on the elevated land behind the north cabins in a style reminiscent of Midholme.

Natural heritage description and values

The Escarpment and steep slopes The rocky escarpment surrounding the holiday resort is in the Watagan Colluvial Soil Landscape Grouping which is characterised by rolling to very steep hills on fine-grained Narrabeen Group sediments. Local relief is 60–120 metres (200–390 ft) with slopes greater than 25%. There are narrow convex crests and ridges, steep colluvial side slopes, occasional sandstone boulders and benches. Vegetation typically consists of tall open-forest with closed-forest in sheltered positions. Soils are typically shallow to deep (30–200 centimetres (12–79 in)) Lithosols/Siliceous Sands (Uc1.24) and Yellow Podzolic Soils on sandstones; moderately deep (100–200 centimetres (39–79 in)) Brown Podzolic Soils (Db1.11), Red Podzolic Soils (Dr2.21) and Gleyed Podzolic Soils (Dg2.21) on shales. Land in the Watagan Soil Landscape Grouping is generally not capable of urban development, regular cultivation or grazing. Soils on sandstone crests and very steep side slopes in these areas are likely to have moderate erodibility but an extreme erosion hazard for both non-concentrated and concentrated flows. Topsoil and subsoil losses arising from urban development are likely to be high. Large variations in soil properties occur over short distances, requiring detailed assessment of surface movement potential.

The Flats

The flatter area on which Midholme, the manager's cottage and the sporting facilities are located has been classified in the Warriewood Swamp Soil Landscape Grouping. This is characterised by level to gently undulating swales, depressions and infilled lagoons on Quaternary sands. Local relief is less than 10 metres (33 ft) and slopes are less than 3%. The water table is at less than 200 centimetres (79 in). The area is mostly cleared of native vegetation. Soils are typically deep (greater than 150 cm), well sorted, sandy Humus Podzois (Uc2.32) and dark, mottled Siliceous Sands (Uc1.21) overlying buried Acid Peats (0) in depressions, deep (greater than 200 centimetres (79 in)) Podzois and pale Siliceous Sands (Uc1.2) on sandy rises. Limitations for this soil landscape grouping are given as localised flooding and run-on, high water tables and highly permeable soil. Land in these areas has a generally low to moderate capability for urban development, with localised swampy areas not capable of urban development. The photographic record and site investigations for Currawong indicate frequent swampy areas on the flats. Drier areas are generally capable of regular cultivation and grazing. The historic record for Currawong suggests that in the 19th century and during the Stiles period of occupation the flats area was used for grazing of dairy cattle and growing of some food crops for domestic consumption. Soils on the flats are likely to have low erodibility and a low erosion hazard for non-concentrated flows, moderate to high erosion hazard for concentrated flows and low to moderate hazard for wind erosion.

The Beach

Although not shown on the Sydney 1:100,000 Soil Landscape map, the beach and foredune areas at Currawong are likely to have similar soil landscape characteristics to those at Great Mackerel Beach. These have been mapped as Narrabeen/Marine which has beaches and coastal foredunes on marine sands. Beach plains with relief to six metres (twenty feet), slopes less than 3%, foredunes with relief less than 20 metres (66 ft) and slope gradients up to 45%. Spinifex grassland / herbland to closed-scrub on foredunes. Soils are deep (greater than 200 centimetres (79 in)) Calcareous sands on beaches, Siliceous Sands and occasional compressed sands on foredunes. Limitations include extreme wind and wave erosion hazard, non-cohesive soil, very low soil fertility and high soil permeability.

Vegetation and escarpment

The study of the Currawong site by Macquarie University students carried out in 1978 provides a detailed analysis of the vegetation. A visual study by Craig Burton, in the Barrenjoey Peninsula and Pittwater Heritage Study, 1989, analysed the spatial and visual structure of Pittwater and mapped areas considered to have a high degree of visibility and considered essential to conserve the environmental heritage and scenery of the place. Burton has mapped visually significant areas based upon historic viewing points, steep slopes and visibility from public areas. The slopes and escarpment at Currawong are ranked as visually significant by Musescape and Beaver.

=== Condition ===
As at 29 May 2007 the physical condition of the buildings and facilities of the holiday camp were generally good. The site is still operational, providing holiday accommodation and is maintained by Unions NSW. Most of the holiday cabins date back to the 1950s and have been well maintained. The heritage listed homestead Midholme was in poor condition in the late 1980s but was restored in 1993.

Three of the other original farm buildings (Southend, Northend & Canning's Cottage) no longer exist, however, some archaeological potential should exist.

In relation to indigenous occupation of the site, it is considered that there is high archaeological potential, as yet not explored. Other archaeological potential may exist in relation to the early use of the site as a working farm.

The site displays a high degree of integrity. The natural areas are relatively intact since pre-European settlement. Some evidence remains from the early settlement and farming of the site, including one of the original farmhouses, Midholme. The use of the site as holiday cabins for NSW Labor Union members continues to this day. While buildings has been altered and modified, the holiday camp maintains high integrity in its built structure with the cabins much the same as when they were built.

== Heritage listing ==
As at 30 April 2009, Currawong is of State historical significance as an intact remaining example of a mid-twentieth century, union-organised workers' holiday camp in NSW, designed for workers "to get away from crowded industrial areas and enjoy places normally frequented by richer people". The establishment of the holiday camp was a response to the social and work place reforms taking place in NSW in the post World War II period, following the introduction of annual leave in 1944 and the 40-hour week in 1947. Currawong is then a physical symbol of the social reform movements of mid-twentieth century Australia, and more specifically celebrates the increased leisure time legislated for workers at that time. Its significance is enhanced by the fact that the camp was established by the NSW Labor Council (now known as Unions NSW), the peak representative body of unions in NSW.

Currawong is of State significance for its historical associations with the post-war union movement in NSW, especially Unions NSW (formerly known as the Labor Council of NSW) and with Jim Kenny, Assistant Secretary of the Labor Council of NSW and Labor premier Jim McGirr. There is also a strong association with the industrial building manufacturers, the Vandyke Brothers. Currawong is furthermore of State social significance for its associations with union members and their families from all over the state who have holidayed there (as well as non-unionists allowed to rent the cottages in off-peak periods), some now returning as third generation visitors. The social significance of the site is also demonstrated by public protests and media debates over the several proposals for its redevelopment since the 1970s.

Currawong is also of State significance for its representative and rarity values. The provision of inexpensive holiday units in seaside locations for members has been a benefit offered by many unions in NSW since the 1950s. However these units tend to be small-scale in their scope and without shared facilities, located in towns or other built-up locations, and of more recent fabric than Currawong. The conservation plan for the Eureka Youth League's "Camp Eureka", which is listed on the Victorian Heritage Register, states that 'Camp Eureka is one of only two "workers" holiday camps' from the 1940s and 50s remaining in their original form; the other being Camp Currawong at Little Mackerel Beach on Pittwater outside Sydney'. Currawong is rare within Australia for having operated as a union camp continuously for 60 years, with little modification of the original fabric of its units.

Currawong is of State significance for its aesthetic values as a workers' holiday camp located amongst bushland and surrounded by national park on a magnificent Sydney waterfront. The cottages are aesthetically distinctive as a group and although not architecturally significant form a rare and important composition grouping. They exemplify a style and are not degraded but clearly represent their history and the informal relationship between them. The Currawong site has high scenic quality derived from its backdrop sandstone escarpment, forested slopes and beach. Its unspoilt natural landscape sits well with the heritage fabric remaining from its farming phase (1830s-1942), and from its union holiday camp phase (1949–present). Both periods of use are readily distinguishable with the later use not obscuring the former use or dominating over the natural environmental values. Two of the holiday cottages at Currawong (No.1, "Kookaburra" and No.3, 'Platypus'), are likely to be of State significance for their technical innovation as examples of intact "Sectionit" holiday cabins. This was a pre-fabricated house system developed by the Vandyke Brothers to reduce production costs. While this form of housing can be found in public housing estates across NSW, the design was especially adapted by Vandyke to Currawong. The Currawong Vandyke cabins are indicative of the relationship between innovative industrialists, Postwar Reconstruction ideals and the union movement.

Currawong is of local heritage significance for its historical values as a colonial farm turned workers' holiday "paradise". One of the early land grants in the Pittwater area, the Currawong property is rare in the area for retaining nearly half of the original 100 acre (40 hectare) grant of 1836, with much of the original grant boundary still legible in the landscape. The historic cottage of Midholme is likely to be of local aesthetic significance as a now rare example of a farmhouse in the Pittwater region, and an early example of the use of fibro in construction there. Currawong has research potential given that it has been continuously occupied in several distinct phases, first by Aboriginal people, then by early settlers and farmers, and most recently be leisure-seekers. A study of the site's importance to the Aboriginal community has not been undertaken but it is likely that there may be sites within the Currawong property that are important to indigenous culture. There is also likely to be archaeological evidence from the farming phase of occupation.

Currawong also has scientific research potential and representative values for its natural environment, being adjacent to and part of an inter-related landscape with Ku-ring-gai National Park, which is listed on the National Heritage Register.

Currawong Workers' Holiday Camp was listed on the New South Wales State Heritage Register on 12 May 2009 having satisfied the following criteria.

The place is important in demonstrating the course, or pattern, of cultural or natural history in New South Wales.

Influenced by labour social ideals and the reconstruction programs of post World War II Australia, Currawong is of State significance for presenting the most intact example of a mid twentieth century union holiday camp in Australia, designed for workers "to get away from crowded industrial areas and enjoy places normally frequented by richer people". The establishment of the holiday camp was a response to the social and work place reforms taking place in NSW in the post World War II period, with the introduction of annual leave in 1944 and the 40-hour week in 1947. Currawong is then a symbol of the social reform movements of mid-twentieth century Australia, and more specifically celebrates the increased leisure time legislated for workers at that time. Its significance is enhanced by the fact that the camp was established by the NSW Labor Council, the peak representative body of unions in NSW. Due to the deprivations arising from the war, development of the camp was initially reliant on donated building materials and the volunteer labour of unionists. The State and federal governments were working together to establish Postwar Reconstruction and housing programs in response to the critical shortages, leading to the development of labour saving construction methods and the industrial manufacture of cost effective building materials. This new approach and the resource constraints of that historical period are embodied in the modest 1950s fibro cabins. Currawong is of local heritage significance for its historical values as a colonial farm turned workers' holiday "paradise". One of the early land grants in the Pittwater area, the Currawong property retains nearly half of the original 40-hectare (100-acre) grant of 1836, with much of the original grant boundary still legible in the landscape.

The place has a strong or special association with a person, or group of persons, of importance of cultural or natural history of New South Wales's history.

Currawong is of State significance for its historical associations with the post-war union movement in NSW. It is associated with Jim Kenny, Assistant Secretary of the Labor Council of NSW, who was passionate about providing an affordable holiday for workers and their families. It is equally strongly associated with the NSW Labor Council and a great many union members who have holidayed there over half a century. It is also associated with Labor premiers Jim McGirr (who was committed to improving the conditions of workers and post-war reconstruction) and Neville Wran (who visited during his term as Premier of NSW and advocated buying the property so that it could be absorbed into Ku-Ring-Gai National Park). There is also a strong association with the industrial building manufacturers, Vandyke Brothers, demonstrated in the two extant Sectionit holiday cabins.

The place is important in demonstrating aesthetic characteristics and/or a high degree of creative or technical achievement in New South Wales.

Currawong is of State significance for its landmark value as a workers' holiday camp located amongst bushland and surrounded by national park on a magnificent Sydney waterfront (described by Governor Phillip in 1788 as "the finest piece of water which I ever saw". . . ). The Currawong site has high scenic quality derived from the striking sandstone escarpment, forested slopes and beach. Currawong presents an unspoilt natural landscape which sits well with the heritage fabric remaining from its farming phase (1830s-1942 - represented by the c.1916 homestead Midholme, some exotic trees and remnant pasture land), and from its union holiday camp phase (1949–present - represented by the intact holiday cabins and facilities). Both periods of use are readily distinguishable with the later use not obscuring the former use or dominating over the natural environmental values. The modest nature of the existing development has enabled the site to retain a high degree of visual integrity compared with other less sensitive developments such as Great Mackerel Beach. Workers cottages 1 and 3 in the union holiday camp are likely to be of State significance for their technical innovation as examples of "Sectionit" prefabricated cabins especially adapted to this site by the manufacturer. The Sectionit prefabricated house system was developed by Christopher Vandyke in the 1930s to reduce production costs of the family home by industrialising building construction, and was adopted by the State Government in an attempt to provide fast and cost effective housing at the end of the Second World War. Vandyke's ideas were innovative for his time and were informed by modernist ideals. The Currawong Vandyke cabins were individually adapted for the Labor Council camp and are indicative of the close relationship between innovative industrialists, Postwar Reconstruction ideals of social economy and the union movement. The historic cottage of Midholme is of local aesthetic significance as a now rare example of a farmhouse in the Pittwater region. Built of timber frame with half weatherboard, half fibro, it is one of the earliest remaining examples of fibro construction in the district.

The place has a strong or special association with a particular community or cultural group in New South Wales for social, cultural or spiritual reasons.

Currawong is long associated with the occupation and ownership by clans of the indigenous Guringai people. Currawong is of State heritage significance for its associations with union members and their families from all over the state who have holidayed there (as well as non-unionists allowed to rent the cottages in off-peak periods), some now returning as third generation visitors. Since its establishment in 1949, Currawong has continued to provide an affordable holiday and is strong in the collective memories of many families. Extensive oral and photographic records provide evidence to this and enhance the long term understanding of the importance of Currawong to many people. Some oral histories have been reproduced in the publication "The Halcyon Days of Summer on Pittwater" (1991) by Audrey Sheperd. A collection of oral histories about Currawong are kept in the Local Studies Collection at Mona Vale Library, including interviews with Bernard Stiles, Flora Webster, the Wells family (who had been visiting Currawong since the mid-1950s), those associated with the trade union movement, a former manager at Currawong and the current caretaker, Barry Kirkman. Currawong also features in the Labor Council Oral History Project. The Carey family were staying in Northend the night it collapsed and the daughter Gabrielle Carey included descriptions of Currawong in her novel "Puberty Blues", which she co-authored with Kathy Lette in 1979. A documentary on the maritime communities of Pittwater, "The Water Dwellers", made by the Australian Commonwealth Film unit in 1967 included reference to Currawong. The social significance of the site is also demonstrated by public protests and media debates over the several proposals for its redevelopment since the 1970s.

The place has potential to yield information that will contribute to an understanding of the cultural or natural history of New South Wales.

Currawong has at least local research potential given that it has been almost continuously occupied in several distinct phases, first by Aboriginal people, then by early settlers and farmers, and most recently be leisure-seekers. A study of the site's importance to the Aboriginal community has not been undertaken but it is likely that there may be sites within the Currawong property that are important to indigenous culture. There is also likely to be archaeological evidence from the farming phase of occupation. Currawong also has scientific research potential based on the natural environment, being adjacent to and part of an inter-related landscape with Ku-ring-gai National Park, which is listed on the National Heritage Register.

The place possesses uncommon, rare or endangered aspects of the cultural or natural history of New South Wales.

Currawong is of State significance as the most intact, mid-twentieth century, union-based holiday camp remaining in NSW, and probably in Australia. The conservation plan for Camp Eureka, which is listed on the Victorian Heritage Register, states that 'Camp Eureka is one of only two "workers" holiday camps' from the 1940s and 50s remaining in their original form; the other being Camp Currawong at Little Mackerell Beach on Pittwater outside Sydney'. Currawong is rare for having operated as a union camp continuously for 60 years, with little modification. By comparison, Camp Eureka was abandoned for several decades from the 1970s and has been substantially restored. The other comparable early union-based holiday camp was the Australian Railways Union Camp near Sussex Inlet, which was opened with some fanfare by Premier McGirr in 1948 (and it is technically located in the ACT, being on Jarvis Bay Territory land). Now known as the New Generation Holiday Camp, it is still union-run (now by the Rail Bus and Tram Union) but was substantially refurbished with new cabins in the 1980s. The Canberra Tradesmen's Union Club has holiday units in 10 locations in NSW (and more in Queensland and Victoria) but the units in Sussex Inlet and Forster are the only ones of a similar vintage to Currawong. While they are modest, intact and still in their original use, the CTUC units are positioned in a strip on a suburban block in town and are more like an apartment block than a holiday camp; moreover both sets of units are planned to be sold in 2007. Currawong is one of few intact groupings of 1950s holiday cabins remaining in NSW, whether union-based or private, and as such demonstrates a modest mid-twentieth century family vacation style and practice that is in danger of being lost. Two of the holiday cottages at Currawong (known as No.1 or "Kookaburra" and No.3 or 'Platypus'), are significant as examples of intact Sectionit holiday cabins. This was a pre-fabricated house system developed by the Vandyke Brothers to reduce production costs and patented in 1936. Sectionit prefabricated houses were built extensively for the Housing Commission and many examples remain. However the design was especially adapted by Christopher Vandyke for Currawong and no other examples of holiday cabins of this kind are known to exist. The historic homestead Midholme (c. 1916) is of local significance as a rare example of a farmhouse in the Pittwater region. It is thought to be one of the earliest uses of manufactured fibro, with asbestos cement sheeting first manufactured in Australia in 1916 (imported since 1910). The natural landscape and low-impact development that characterises the appearance of Currawong is increasingly uncommon in Pittwater especially when compared to the adjacent Greater Mackerel Beach area (which formed part of the original land grant for Currawong).

The place is important in demonstrating the principal characteristics of a class of cultural or natural places/environments in New South Wales.

Currawong is of State significance as the most intact remaining example of a mid-twentieth century, union-based workers' holiday camp in NSW. This significance is enhanced by the fact that the camp was established by the Labor Council, the peak representative body of unions in NSW, and it was hoped that Currawong would act as the prototype for a network of union-based holiday camps, although this plan never eventuated. The place is representative of a modest mid-twentieth century family vacation style and practice that is in danger of being lost. Currawong is representative of the Pittwater region's natural environment, retaining many examples of endangered flora and fauna. The majority of the Currawong estate is remnant bushland and provides habitat for Lyre birds, bandicoot, curlew, honeyeater, giant dragon flies and possibly koalas.
