= Royal National Park Coastal Cabin Communities =

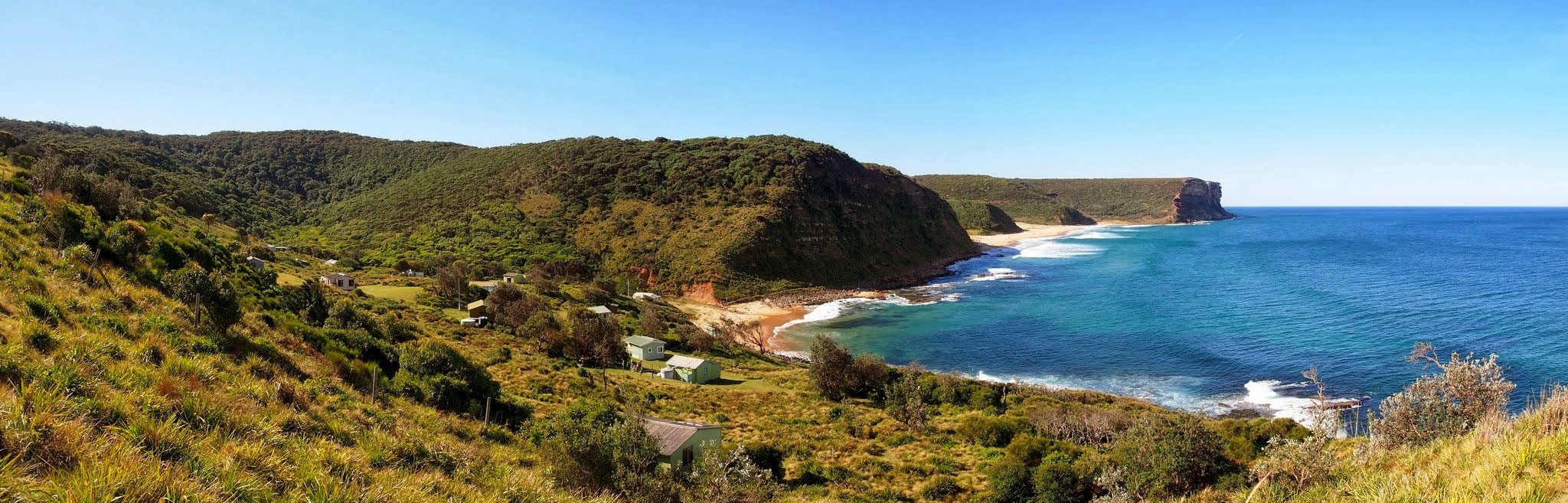
- Little Garie Beach

- Location within New South Wales Location within Australia
- 34.1797°S 151.0540°E
- Location: Royal National Park, Lilyvale, City of Wollongong, New South Wales, Australia

History
- Built: 1930–1950

Site notes
- Architect: Various.
- Owner: Department of Planning, Housing & Infrastructure

New South Wales Heritage Register
- Official name: Royal National Park Coastal Cabin Communities; Royal National Park Coastal Cabin Communities of Little Garie; South Era and Burning Palms; Royal National Park Coastal Shack Communities
- Type: state heritage (built)
- Designated: 27 April 2012
- Reference no.: 1878
- Type: Other – Recreation & Entertainment
- Category: Recreation and Entertainment

Royal National Park Coastal Cabin Communities are heritage-listed cabin communities in the Royal National Park, Lilyvale, New South Wales, Australia. They were built from 1930 to 1950 by private citizens using their own initiative, resources and labour. It refers to the specific communities of Little Garie, Era and Burning Palms, also known collectively as the Royal National Park Coastal Shack Communities. The area is owned by the Department of Planning, Housing & Infrastructure. It was added to the New South Wales State Heritage Register on 27 April 2012.

== History ==
In the 1870s, Sydney was expanding at a rapid pace, helped partly by the extension of the railway network, but railroads needed a helping hand to make them viable and keep them expanding. Premier of New South Wales John Robertson believed this could be achieved by encouraging people to take train rides to the countryside. At the time, appreciation of the wilderness was a growing trend in Sydney and around the world, and the world's first national park was proclaimed in the United States at Yellowstone in 1872. Robertson was also concerned about both logging and the growth of the city continuing unchecked without green spaces. In 1879 he proclaimed an area south of Sydney as a national park. In 1954, Queen Elizabeth II travelled through the park by train and in 1955 it became the Royal National Park.

The cabin communities of Little Garie, Era, and Burning Palms and were generally built between the late-1930s and early-1950s on freehold land with the permission of the landholder or the person holding grazing rights. The land at Portions 1, 7, 13, 44, 47 and 48 Parish Bulgo, County of Westmoreland are collectively known as the "Era Lands". Portion 1, the largest portion, was a grant in 1832 to Andrew Byrne. On Byrne's death, c. 1868, the land was managed by a Trust along with other property of Byrne for the benefit of the Trustees. The other portions were in various ownership; Portions 13 and 44, where Little Garie is sited, were owned by the Adams and Collaery families respectively.

Byrne, who held land in Sydney and Appin, ran cattle on these lands and this was continued by his descendants who used the Burgh track to move cattle to and from the area. This track was later used by Helensburgh miners and people fishing to get to the coast in what later became the cabin areas.

The Aboriginal sites recorded within and around the cabin groupings provide evidence of the long Aboriginal use and occupation of this area. This association was continued during the pastoral use period and oral history indicates that the first hut was built at Era by the Aboriginal stockman "Old Tom" and that it was present in about 1910-1912. Tom was employed to look after the cattle on the land that supplied meat to southern Sydney and the Illawarra. This cabin was later taken over by the Lightfoot family of Helensburgh, and today is believed to be cabin No. 88.

In the 1910s and 1920s, people from the nearby mining town of Helensburgh often visited the coast and camped in the area, usually to fish. During the Depression, the number of campers and occupants increased with extended periods of occupation. Little Garie was known as Tin Hut at this time. The Collaery family allowed the building of cabins on the area they owned or had grazing rights over. In the late 1930s, Robert Gray, who had a World War I soldier settler grant on top of the escarpment, obtained a grazing lease from the Trustees of the Byrne Estate. Gray allowed the building of shacks, allocated sites for them and collected rent, initially a shilling a week, rising to 2 shillings per week by the 1940s.

During the mid-to-later 1930s, more bushwalkers from Sydney discovered the area as a recreation resource, some arriving from the adjoining National Park with others making their way down the ridge to what were termed "hide away" villages in the press of the time.

During World War II and immediately after, the numbers of huts grew as people from Sydney joined those from Helensburgh. This reflects a pattern of social and workplace reforms in NSW at that time including the introduction of annual leave in 1944. In 1944 there were approximately 38 cabins at Era, 13 at Little Garie and 15 at Burning Palms. At this time a number of Sydney artists "found" Era and people such as Margaret Olley, Max Dupain, David Moore, Hal Missingham and many others visited and stayed at the community.

In the mid-1940s, rumours circulated that the Byrne estate was to sell the land. People at Era and Burning Palms formed a Protection League with its first meeting taking place on 14 October 1945 at Era in order to try to purchase the land, or otherwise seek the protection of the cabin communities. A notice of sale for the Portion 1 Byrne Estate land was placed in the Sun Herald newspaper in February 1950.

After considerable organisation and lobbying by bushwalker organisations and the Protection League the land was resumed by the State Government in February 1950 for the purpose of public recreation. At that time some nature conservation groups questioned inclusion of the area into the National Park because of the recreation development focus of the National Park Trust, preferring inclusion into Garawarra State Park. Indeed, some evidence suggests that a close relationship existed between Deputy Premier Joseph Cahill, who was also the Chairman of the National Park Trust, and the Little Garie community that may have played a part in the decision to resume.

Nevertheless, in September 1953 the area was incorporated into the National Park administered by the National Park Trust. In 1953 there were 37 cabins at Little Garie, 116 at Era and 43 at Burning Palms. At the time of resumption the Lands Minister advised the Secretary of the Protection League that cabin owners could "remain in possession" of their huts and tents. The National Park became the Royal National Park in 1954 in honour of the Queen's visit to Australia. The Royal National Park, first established in 1879, is an iconic national park being the oldest in Australia and the second oldest in the world.

The State Park Trust prepared a full inventory of the cabins in 1953 (including size, construction and ownership details) with Lands Inspector Mr Kentwell recommending that the cabins and their occupation was an appropriate use of the land and that the revenue would provide important revenue for the Trust. At this time the Trust relied to some extent on the income of permissive occupancies. At Bonnie Vale on Port Hacking, adjacent to Bundeena, it had planned and managed the construction of what became a cabin village.

For the next 16 years, rental on the cabins was collected by the National Park Trust and cabins were bought and sold, with the Park Trust being notified of these transfers. Some current members of the cabin communities purchased their cabins during this time.

Embryonic community moves to set up surf clubs at Era and Burning Palms received added impetus following a drowning at Era in 1938. Asher Joel (later Sir Asher Joel), then publicist for the National Park Trust, was charged by the Trust to assist with setting up Surf Clubs at Garie Beach, Era and Burning Palms. He became the first President of the Garie Surf Life Saving Club. Those three clubs operate to this day and it is their proud boast that they have not had a single drowning on a patrol day.

There was no formal documentation of licences until in 1965 the Park Trust was forced by the then Minister of Lands (and later Premier) Tom Lewis, to issue a Permissive Occupancy that regularised the occupations. This Permissive Occupancy (PO) document prevented the transfer of cabins in the future. Cabin owners opposed it, but by 1966 were forced to sign the PO agreement after threats that if it was not signed "action would be taken".

With the passing of the National Parks and Wildlife Act (NSW), 1967 the Park Trust was dissolved and the National Parks and Wildlife Service established to manage national parks in NSW. The philosophical environment in this period favoured the reinforcement of natural values by removing where necessary cultural places and uses, in particular places of habitation. Within RNP, occupancies tolerated by the National Park Trust were removed. In the immediate area fishermen's shacks at Werrong, Jibbon and Marley were all removed, and the historic Allambie Guest House was burnt down. Other guest houses on the Hacking River were demolished, whilst other buildings were allowed to fall into disrepair and were removed.

The 1966 Permissive Occupancy agreement was replaced in 1979 by a licence that was terminable at the will of the Minister and non-transferable. The National Parks and Wildlife Service adopted the policy of removing the cabins on the death of the owner, or if rent fell into arrears. Over the next thirty years over 55 cabins at Era, Burning Palms and Little Garie and the whole community of Bonnie Vale (with the exception of approximately 8-10 cabins) were removed.

In order to circumvent the cabin demolition policy, there were unofficial transfers of cabins. In some instances, when people died the family did not notify the NPWS of the death and the family continued to pay the rent. Other transfers of cabins occurred with elderly people who could no longer maintain them adopting another community member, particularly a Surf Club member, to assist with and take over the cabin.

In the 1980s, the communities sought and achieved heritage listing with the National Trust of Australia and the Australian Heritage Commission and nominated the groups for protection under the 1977 Heritage Act (NSW). As a result of these listings and nomination the NPWS prepared a state-wide huts study, part of which was a draft Cabins Conservation Plan that was placed on public exhibition in September 1994 along with a revised Plan of Management for the Royal National Park. The draft CMP recommended the retention of all the cabin communities and the Plan of Management recognised that the cabin communities were of cultural significance and should be retained.

Along with the public exhibition of the draft Cabins Conservation Plan a moratorium was placed on cabin demolition. The Plan of Management was adopted in February 2000 and a subsequent RNP Coastal Cabins Areas Conservation Management Plan (CMP) was prepared in 2005.

In December 2006, following proceedings in the Land and Environment Court instigated by the RNP Coastal Cabins Protection League, an agreement was reached between the majority of cabin owners in the Little Garie, Era and Burning Palms communities and the Minister for the Environment that provides for a licence to these cabin owners for up to 20 years and does not exclude the issuing of further licences (but the Minister is not bound in any way to do so). The Bulgo community, at the far southern end of RNP with approximately 57 cabins, was not party to that court action and agreement and has chosen not to be part of this SHR nomination.

There are two other cabin groups within RNP: one coastal cabin group at Bulgo below Otford at the southern end of the Park and one at Bonnie Vale adjacent to Bundeena on Port Hacking at the northern end of the Park. The Bulgo group of approximately 53 cabins are similar in their form and in the nature of construction and use, however they are more strongly associated with the mining community of Helensburgh. The Bonnie Vale cabins are different to the coastal groups; they were constructed under the auspices of the National Park Trust and the site was accessible by car which has changed, to some extent, the nature of the built form. Along with the Bulgo and Bonnie Vale cabins the cabin communities at Little Garie, Era and Burning Palms are by far the largest remaining groups of recreational cabins within the OEH estate and NSW generally. The historical associations with RNP and the aesthetic qualities of their dramatic landscape settings also set these RNP cabins apart from similar structures elsewhere.

While there are a large number of huts within Kosciuszko National Park and elsewhere within OEH estate, the RNP cabins are quite different in their history, construction and nature of use to the other huts; the huts are also diversely located whereas the RNP cabins are closely grouped with different resulting cultural landscape and social values.

Other small cabin groups exist within OEH estate such as: Crater Cove, Dobroyd Head; Sydney Harbour National Park (7 huts), Mullet Creek, Brisbane Water National Park (11 cabins and cottages spread along the Creek); and Sandon, Yuraygir National Park, north of Grafton (13 cabins in 3 groups). There are two groups of cabins licensed to professional fishers in Myall Lakes National Park; 9 cabins for prawn fishers at Tamboy on the Myall River; and the 7 fishers cabins on Broughton Island. All of these groups are smaller and have different historical and physical characteristics to the RNP coastal cabins.

Outside OEH estate in NSW, small weekender cabin groups exist at Boat Harbour, Kurnell; Patonga, Pittwater; several small groups on Lake Macquarie on land managed by the Department of Lands; and the former Currawong Workers' Holiday Camp at Pittwater. Similarly to OEH estate, these groups represent significantly different histories and physical characteristics to the RNP coastal cabins; for example the Currawong cottages were constructed in a planned manner by a single entity at one time.

Weekender cabin groups exist in other states: in Tasmania around the central highlands lakes; on the Murray River in Victoria; and in South Australia and Western Australia. However, in these states there has been a progressive removal of cabins in the last three decades, particularly on public lands.

An important contextual issue is the associations between the cabin communities and the history and significance of Royal National Park, now included on the National Heritage List. RNP provides important evidence of key developments in the nature of recreation in Australia and also provides a visually and ecologically significant setting for the cabin groups.

Royal National Park was named NSW's most popular national park for domestic visitors in 2012 when a state government commissioned survey found it received 4 million visits during that year. The surge of popularity followed restoration of the Audley Dance Hall, providing a new visitor centre, cafe and function centre. The latest survey showed visits dropped to 3.2 million in 2014, relegating it to second most popular (to Blue Mountains National Park).

In September 2015, Royal National Park grew by 8.5ha through inclusion of a parcel of land at Bundeena previously owned by Sutherland Shire Council. The transfer of ownership is the first part of a "land swap" the Council has been seeking from the state government. In return, Council is expected to be given ownership of Loftus Oval, Heathcote Oval and Grays Point Oval, which at present are part of the National Park. Council has requested that extra land be excised from the National Park next to Loftus Oval so an extra playing field, with a synthetic surface, can be provided. It is believed the transfer of the Bundeena site, which includes a former night soil depot, was gazetted in August. Environment Minister Mark Speakman and Mayor Kent Johns were set to make an announcement on site yesterday but it was cancelled on Friday. Mr Speakman said the council-owned land was added to the National Park at no cost to the government. He said it contained upland swamp, a coastal relic cliff dune system and endangered vegetation communities. It was home to rare and threatened plants and animals, including the eastern pygmy possum, several species of honeyeaters and the firetail. He said the deal coincided with a $2m upgrade of the Royal Coastal Track between Bundeena and Marley.

== Description ==
The coastal cabin communities of Little Garie, Era and Burning Palms are located around separate beaches in the southern area of Royal National Park (RNP). Access is only on foot, either around the rocks from Garie Beach in the north or down Burgh ridge from the Garawarra carpark. Each community has a distinctive visual character reflecting particular histories and topography but is generally defined by tight groupings of cabins within cleared grassed areas that are backed by the dense rainforest escarpment and separated by headlands.

The 20 cabins at Little Garie are located on the southern side of Black Gin Gully and sheltered from southerly winds by Thelma Head.

Era is the largest group with 95 cabins in distinct groupings around Mid Era Point at the north end of Era Beach, Semi Detached Point at the south end of the beach and around Era Gully. The close proximity of cabins on Semi Detached Point reflects an historic association with mining families from Helensburgh who first built on this hill; hence the alternative name for this area, Burgh Hill.

The location of the 28 cabins on and near the headland at the northern end of Burning Palms Beach reflects a period when cabins were moved from behind Burning Palms Beach with the creation of Garawarra State Park in 1934.

A cabin is a particular type of residence that is between a hut and a cottage in size and is usually associated with temporary accommodation as a coastal weekender. Typical RNP coastal cabins are one or two room single level structures constructed with a light timber frame with either asbestos cement, corrugated iron or weatherboard external cladding; often with an unlined interior. Roofs are usually of a gable form, often with a skillion portion over an enclosed verandah. The roofs are usually clad in corrugated iron and are often unlined internally. A number of the cabins are an unusual design and construction, some utilising local stone and other recycled and locally found materials that have distinctive aesthetic qualities that express highly individualised design tastes.

Many cabins contain technology dating to the 1930s, including kerosene fridges and stoves. In addition to the traditional form of the cabins, other traditional vernacular features include the external expression of an enclosure for fuel stove cookers, bucket shower enclosures and a pit toilet nearby. Notwithstanding current regulations prohibiting the use of local wood and the advent of modern technologies such as LPG cooking and solar lighting, many cabins deliberately retain examples of these earlier societal technologies as part of a cabin heritage experience and for passing down the knowledge to subsequent generations. Within the settings of many cabins are beer bottle retaining walls, toilets, fireplaces and washing lines and introduced plants such as aloe and oleander. The lack of fencing and roads make a distinctive aesthetic for groupings of buildings of such numbers.

The isolated locations of these communities that required material to be carried in and the nature of tenure has meant that cabins have been constructed and repaired with a wide variety of recycled materials and materials found on site (e.g. driftwood, flotsam and local stone). The exposed coastal location necessitates continual ongoing repair and maintenance, further enhancing the eclectic character of cabin fabric.

Whilst the curtilage for their heritage listing is a distinct boundary around each cabin community (excluding the Era and Burning Palms Surf Life Saving Clubs) that encompasses all cabins within each of the three nominated areas of Burning Palms, Little Garie and South Era, it is noted that this curtilage is set within a broader landscape setting that provides for key views to and from the cabin areas and includes the escarpment above the communities, the Burgh and Thelma ridges and Garawarra carpark.

=== Condition ===
Most of the cabins were reported to be in good condition and are regularly maintained by their owners as at 20 September 2011. The current licence provides for the cabins to be maintained within agreed standards with strict limitations imposed on the nature and extent of change permissible. Given the maritime location and simple nature of construction, continual protective maintenance, including the need for fabric replacement over time, is both necessary and an important characteristic of the cabins' significance.

The archaeological sites and features of the cabin areas (including those that relate to pastoral activities at North Era) have the ability to yield information about the occupation and development of these areas over time. The archaeological resource forms part of the built fabric and form of the sites and provides evidence of local design and adaptation to buildings and their surroundings. Individual items such as garbage scatters and pits, construction techniques and materials of the cabins and related structures, wells, long drop toilets etc, possess scientific and research potential.

The overall integrity of the cabin communities remains high. Between 1953, when cabin numbers were at their highest, and 1990 when a moratorium on cabin removals was instigated by the then National Parks and Wildlife Service (NPWS), approximately 55 cabins were removed. These losses have not impacted the overall integrity of the collective size or "critical mass" of the groups. Currently, one cabin at Era is a "stabilised ruin" due to a dispute between its owners and OEH which has not allowed the building to be repaired or occupied. Two cabins at Burning Palms are required to be removed by the OEH due to geotechnical issues. The Burning Palms community wishes to relocate or rebuild these cabins in another environmentally appropriate site; however OEH is considering whether this is appropriate.

=== Modifications and dates ===
Prior to the original Permissive Occupancy agreements in the 1950s many cabins were altered with small additions or with the infill of verandahs. However, since that time the external footprints and external form have remained generally intact and are now controlled by the current licence agreements and condition standards. As noted above, fabric repair and fabric change is a necessity because of remoteness and the maritime location and is also part of the character and significance of the cabins. This aspect is recognised in the Conditions Standards that form part of the current licences. Alternative technologies and adaptation to changing technology (such as solar systems) are also cabin characteristics and appropriate change in technology is recognised in the Conditions Standards that form part of the current licences. Policies prohibiting the collection of firewood have seen many cabins change from traditional outdoor and indoor wood fire cooking to gas fired BBQs and stoves.

== Heritage listing ==
The Royal National Park (RNP) coastal cabin communities of Little Garie, Era and Burning Palms are of State heritage significance as the largest and most intact groups of vernacular coastal weekender cabins remaining in NSW. Cabin communities were once common along the coast of NSW and the groups at Little Garie (20 cabins), South Era (95 cabins) and Burning Palms (28 cabins) are now rare in the State context and along with the Bulgo group in RNP are likely to represent a small number of similar cabin groups remaining in Australia.

These cabin communities are historically important in a NSW context as evidence of the development of a distinctive way of life associated with recreation from the middle parts of the twentieth century, once common in coastal NSW but now rare. The cabins provide evidence of the development of simple weekender accommodation around Sydney from the 1920s and 1930s starting with tent accommodation that developed into huts and cabins. The cabins also reflect the embracing of Sydney's bush hinterland in the early part of the twentieth century and the reciprocal role the bush had in the development of recreation and conservation philosophy in NSW. The cabin communities represent a type of simple weekend escape from Sydney now rare because of changing recreation lifestyles, conservation requirements and development pressure. The cabin communities are part of an important landscape demonstrating key phases in the history of Royal National Park including Aboriginal occupation, pastoralism, agriculture and recreation uses. The latter began in the 1920s, continued during the Depression period and intensified during and immediately after the Second World War, reflecting important social and workplace reforms in NSW at that time that provided more leisure time (State Significance).

The historical associations of the coastal cabin communities encompass both the Sydney and Illawarra regions, with some of these associations extending back to the 1920s. The cabins themselves are significant for their continuity of use and associations, most of them for over sixty years. Historical associations are found with the northern Illawarra mining community of Helensburgh in particular, and this association is reflected most strongly in the Burgh Hill area of Era. There are strong historical associations between the Surf Life Saving clubs formed in each cabin area, with other clubs in the Sydney metropolitan area and with other emergency rescue services. The cabin communities are significant for their long historic associations with important designers, artists, musicians, writers and poets over time including Gordon Andrews, Max Dupain, Hal Missingham, David Moore and more recently Chris O'Doherty aka Reg Mombasa (Local Significance).

The cabin communities demonstrate aesthetic and creative achievement with the combination of large village-like groupings of a now rare vernacular building type located within dramatic landscape settings of cleared former pastoral areas separated by erodible cliffs and backed by the rainforest escarpment. These distinctive cabin landscapes have no direct comparison in terms of scale and setting in NSW. A number of the cabins have distinctive aesthetic qualities reflecting highly individualised design tastes and the use of local stone and other recycled materials (State Significance).

The cabin communities have social significance at a state level because of the breadth of direct associations across a broad regional area, the strength of ties and sense of identity within each cabin community associated with the cabins lifestyle, its values and a strong sense of place in the landscape and for individual and family associations. The strong family and individual associations with the cabins reflect, in many cases, continuous associations for four generations. The relative isolation of the cabin communities, not accessible by car, has influenced the physical and social nature of these communities (State Significance).

The cabin communities have the potential to yield information that will contribute to a further understanding of the historic, aesthetic and social values of the cabin communities. Changing attitudes to conservation and recreation in RNP, research on changes in the design use of cabins and the social dynamics within the cabin communities are examples of potential research relating the historic, aesthetic and social values of these communities (Local Significance).

The cabin communities represent a rare recreation lifestyle and architecture that is becoming uncommon in Australia and rare in a NSW context. The visibility of historic landscape layers, the scale of the cabin groups and their dramatic landscape settings have produced a rare series of recreational cultural landscapes in a NSW context. There are no similar sized groups of weekender cabin communities remaining in NSW, apart from the Bulgo group at the southern end of RNP (State Significance).

While the cabin areas are representative of the principal characteristics of NSW mid-twentieth century vernacular weekender architecture on public coastal land, the particular history, strength and breadth of social associations and the size and settings and groupings of these cabin groups are unusual and outstanding in a NSW context (State Significance).

The historic, aesthetic, rarity and representative values most strongly contribute to the overall State significance of the Little Garie, Era and Burning Palms cabin communities.

Royal National Park Coastal Cabin Communities was listed on the New South Wales State Heritage Register on 27 April 2012 having satisfied the following criteria.

The place is important in demonstrating the course, or pattern, of cultural or natural history in New South Wales.

The cabin communities of Little Garie, Era and Burning Palms are historically important in a NSW context as evidence of the development of a distinctive way of life associated with particular recreation and leisure pastimes from the middle parts of the twentieth century, once common on coastal NSW but now rare. Along with the Bulgo group in RNP, these three groups are the largest and most intact examples of weekender cabin communities remaining in NSW.

The cabin communities are part of an important landscape demonstrating key phases in the history of Royal National Park including Aboriginal occupation, pastoralism and agriculture but particularly recreation uses that started in the 1920s, continued during the Depression period and intensified during and immediately after the Second World War.

The cabins are significant for their continuity of use for over fifty years. The cabins provide evidence of the development of simple weekender accommodation around Sydney from the 1920s and 1930s, starting with tent accommodation and developing into huts and cabins. The cabins also reflect the embracing of Sydney's bush hinterland in the early part of the twentieth century and the reciprocal role the bush had in the development of recreation and conservation philosophy in NSW. The rapid growth in cabin numbers from the mid-1940s reflect important social and workplace reforms in NSW at that time that provided more leisure time.

The cabin communities are historically significant in demonstrating links between Sydney and the Illawarra, in particular the northern Illawarra coal mining town of Helensburgh and southern Sydney suburbs. It was Helensburgh miners and their families who first visited the area and stayed for extended periods during the Depression. Bushwalkers from Sydney joined the Helensburgh families as car and public transport assisted access to the area.

The RNP cabins and cabins lifestyle represent unique historic patterns of use that reflect self regulated communities operating within, and effected by, the nature of tenure and the actions of various external agencies (land trustee, Park Trustee and NPWS/OEH) and other stakeholders (including national parks and conservation stakeholder groups) that have strongly influenced the physical and social character of the cabin communities. These historic patterns and influences are reflected in the cabins landscapes where individual freedom has been tempered by community responsibilities (both local and broad) and other controls and restrictions arising from their location within an iconic national park. The history of the cabins community reflects important aspects of NSW community and social history where both diverse and minority viewpoints and lifestyles were tolerated at a time when they were not supported with the mainstream community.

The cabin communities are an important aspect of the history of Royal National Park itself. The establishment of nature conservation groups is a key aspect of the identified national values of RNP and the tension between nature conservation and recreation management, including the future of the cabins, is a major theme in the history of Royal National Park. The cabins and extent of the cabin community areas are evidence of the extension of the National Park (later Royal National Park) in 1950 and the commitment of the then government to conserve important landscapes in response to the lobbying of both nature conservation and cabins groups (State Significant).

The place has a strong or special association with a person, or group of persons, of importance of cultural or natural history of New South Wales's history.

The historical associations of the coastal cabin communities of Little Garie, Era and Burning Palms encompass both the Sydney and Illawarra regions, with some of these associations extending back to the 1920s and most being continuous since the 1940s. Broad historical associations are found with the northern Illawarra mining communities generally and that of Helensburgh in particular. This association is reflected most strongly in the Burgh Hill area of Era.

There are strong historical associations between the Surf Life Saving clubs formed in each cabin area with other clubs in the Sydney metropolitan area and with other emergency rescue services.

There have been historical associations between the cabin communities and the observance of ANZAC Day ceremonies, with dawn services held regularly at places such as Little Garie.

The cabin communities are associated with early Sydney and Illawarra bushwalking groups who joined with cabin owners to lobby for the extension of the national park in the 1940s, although at times the bushwalking groups have lobbied to have the cabins removed.

The cabins are significant for their long historic associations with artists, musicians, writers and poets over time including Gordon Andrews, Max Dupain, Hal Missingham, Margret Olley, David Moore, Roland Robinson and more recently Chris O'Doherty aka Reg Mombasa.

While connected with a wide variety of people and groups of broad significance in the Sydney region, the cabins communities are not considered to meet this criterion at a state level.

The place is important in demonstrating aesthetic characteristics and/or a high degree of creative or technical achievement in New South Wales.

The cabin communities of Little Garie, Era and Burning Palms are large village-like groupings of a now rare vernacular building type located within landscape settings of cleared former pastoral areas separated by erodible cliffs and backed by the rainforest escarpment. These cabin landscapes have no direct comparison in terms of scale and setting in NSW.

The weekender cabin that evolved in the early part of the twentieth century is unusual as a building type in terms of both design and use. These particular examples are important reflections of this period and use; although they were constructed relatively free from specific design controls, later change was limited by licence controls and the lack of tenure and this assisted the preservation of vernacular characteristics and use.

The repetitive patterning of building styles and materials demonstrates the communal and traditional nature of construction and the limitations imposed by the natural environment and isolated locations of the cabins areas. The changes over time in materials, including those recycled and from the sites, as well as changes in technology, reflect creative achievement and adaptability and a creative and technical response to site and place. A number of the cabins are examples of highly individualised design styles and tastes, utilising local stone and other recycled and locally found materials in a distinctive manner that reflects a high level of creative achievement (State significant).

The place has strong or special association with a particular community or cultural group in New South Wales for social, cultural or spiritual reasons.

The cabin communities of Little Garie, Era and Burning Palms have social significance at a State level because of the breadth of direct associations across a broad regional area, the strength of ties and sense of identity within the cabin community areas associated with the cabins lifestyle, and sense of place in the landscape and the continuous and strong family associations, in many cases for four generations.

Parts of the cabins area localities have particular importance to the Dharawal people as burial sites. The coastal edge surrounding the cabin areas remains an important fishery for the local Aboriginal community, particularly the Wadi Wadi people of the Illawarra at Wollongong and La Perouse and other Dharawal people of the south coast. The cabins areas contain sites that have cultural, spiritual and social associations with Dharawal people and local community associations such as the Illawarra Local Aboriginal Land Council and La Perouse Local Aboriginal Land Council.

The cabin areas have social value for the long term visitors and users of these areas for recreational activities from Sydney and the Illawarra, in particular the northern Illawarra coal mining communities and southern Sydney/Sutherland communities. The Helensburgh community has had a strong and continuous association with Era in particular for over sixty years and many Helensburgh families have had associations with particular cabins for at least four generations.

The Surf Life Saving clubs at Burning Palms, Era, and Garie Beach (which Little Garie is associated with) have high social value for the services that they provide to cabin users and recreational users of the local area. The surf clubs contain a strong focus on community identity and sense of belonging, and are strongly associated with the surf life saving movement, along with specific Sydney metropolitan clubs.

The group of people that make up each cabin community area have strong community ties and hold in high esteem the values of the cabins and their history. The members of each cabin community have a strong collective association with these scenic but isolated places and the particular lifestyle involved, including the transfer of generational values and of self sufficiency, respect for different values and beliefs and shared obligations for issues such as track maintenance and surf lifesaving. Social significance at a community level is also reflected in the collective efforts to respond to the various issues that have arisen and through the efforts of the Cabins Protection League and the Surf Clubs.

The cabins provide a strong sense of identity for the families of cabin owners, many of whom now have four generations of direct and continuous associations with the cabins. People now come from all over NSW and Australia with several cabin owners living as far afield as Darwin and Tasmania. The cabins also have social significance associated with a sense of loss for those families who had licences terminated and cabins removed prior to 1990 or for those who have lost family members closely associated with particular cabins.

The place has potential to yield information that will contribute to an understanding of the cultural or natural history of New South Wales.

The cabin communities of Little Garie, Era and Burning Palms have the potential to yield information that will contribute to a further understanding of the historic, aesthetic and social values of the cabin communities. Changing attitudes to conservation and recreation in RNP, research on changes in the design and use of cabins and the social dynamics within the cabin communities are examples of potential research relating the historic, aesthetic and social values of these cabin communities.

The nature and diversity of the Aboriginal archaeological sites within RNP and the cabin areas has the potential to contribute to our understanding of pre-Contact Aboriginal occupation of the south coast of NSW.

The cabins areas have the potential to yield information on the evolution of coastal ecology and regeneration within a concentrated culturally modified area.

The cabins areas have the potential to yield information on the development of the vernacular weekender cabin as a mid-twentieth century architectural style. Many of the cabins contain rare fabric, design and siting details from the first phases of establishment during the 1930s (demonstrating the evolution of the cabins from weekend recreation use to permanent structures).

The cabins have the potential to yield information on the use and maintenance of early twentieth century technology now becoming rare such as kerosene ovens, stoves, lamps and fridges. The cabin areas also have the potential to yield information on communities that developed and maintained their own water, power and waste systems in non road accessible locations without government supplied services.

The archaeological features of the cabins areas such as the various paths and tracks and beer bottle retaining walls have potential to yield information about the use and development the areas (Local Significance).

The place possesses uncommon, rare or endangered aspects of the cultural or natural history of New South Wales.

It meets this criterion of State significance because the cabin communities represent a rare recreation lifestyle and architecture that is becoming uncommon in Australia and rare in a NSW context. The visibility of historic landscape layers, the scale of the cabin groups and their dramatic landscape settings have produced a rare series of recreational cultural landscapes in a NSW context. There are no similar sized groups of weekender cabin communities remaining in NSW, apart from the Bulgo group at the southern end of RNP. Particular historical, administrative and locational circumstances have shaped the physical and social composition of these large groups in a manner not found elsewhere.

The place is important in demonstrating the principal characteristics of a class of cultural or natural places/environments in New South Wales.

The cabin areas are of Significance because they are representative of the principal characteristics of other NSW mid-twentieth century vernacular weekenders on public coastal land such as Mullet Creek, Dark Corner-Patonga, Crater Cove, Bonnie Vale and Boat Harbour-Kurnell. The particular history, strength and breadth of social associations and the size and settings and groupings of these cabin groups are unusual and in the opinion of the cabin community outstanding in a NSW context. The history of the cabin groups are representative of the key historic themes in the history of RNP, a nationally listed place; the size and differing cultural and community backgrounds of these cabins communities is unusual and the remoteness of the groups has resulted in particular constraints not demonstrated in other examples. These other groups are either more spread out (Mullet Creek), represent quite different histories (Crater Cove), and administration and construction (Bonnie Vale).
