= Currawong Beach =

- Suburb
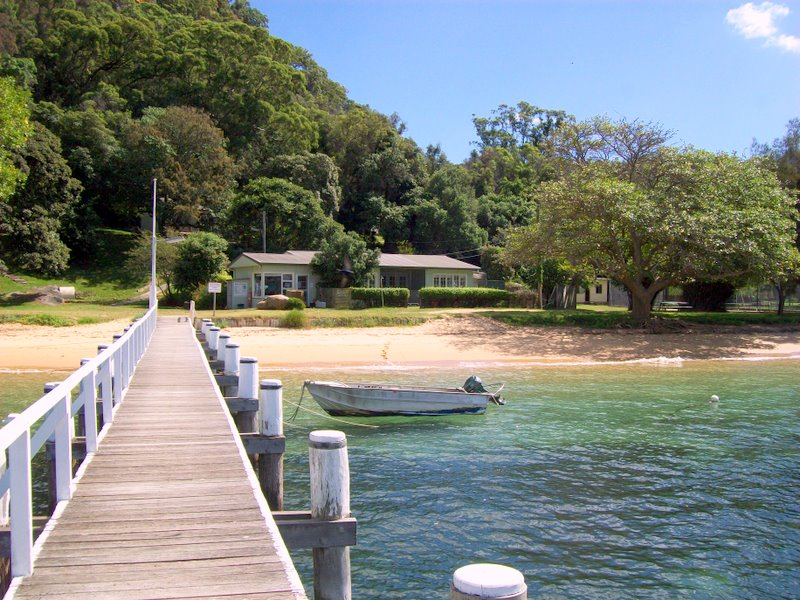
- Currawong Beach

- Interactive map of Currawong Beach
- Country: Australia
- State: New South Wales
- City: Sydney
- LGA: Northern Beaches Council
- Location: 42 km (26 mi) north of Sydney CBD
- Established: 1949

Government
  - State electorate: Pittwater
  - Federal division: Mackellar
- Postcode: 2108
Suburbs around Currawong Beach
	Great Mackerel Beach
Ku-ring-gai Chase National Park	Currawong Beach	Palm Beach
	Coasters Retreat

Currawong Beach is a suburb in northern Sydney, in the state of New South Wales, Australia. Currawong Beach is 42 kilometres (26 mi) north of the Sydney central business district, in the local government area of Northern Beaches Council.

Currawong Beach is located on the edge of Ku-ring-gai Chase National Park, on the western shores of Pittwater, beside Great Mackerel Beach and north of The Basin. Coasters Retreat and Palm Beach are located nearby.

== History ==
Currawong, originally named Little Mackaral Beach, was settled by John Clarke in 1823, a NSW Military Veteran. The land was purchased by William Burke in 1824. Governor Thomas Brisbane formally granted the land to Burke on 16 January 1835. Burke had arrived in NSW in 1815 and had farmed in Bringelly from 1820. In 1835 Burke leased part of the land to Patrick Flinn, a convict.

The Wilson family owned Little Mackarel from 1871 until 1908, when the property was known as "Wilsons Beach" In 1908 Little Mackerel Beach came into the possession of Pink Marie Stiles, who was married to Dr. Bernard Tarlton Stiles, a physician. The Wilson house, occupied by the Stiles family, was destroyed by fire before 1917. Between 1916 and 1917 a house named "Africa" was built by the Stiles family. This house survives today, albeit renamed "Midholme". The Stiles family also constructed a house known as "Wildenerss" or "Southend", used as a general store and guest house. Little Mackarel Beach was purchased by the Port Jackson & Manly Steamship Company in 1942.

=== Currawong Workers' Holiday Camp ===
In 1949 the Port Jackson & Manly Steamship Company sold the Beach to the Labor Council of New South Wales for £10,000, including 4 cottages. Following on from the legislated 40-hour working week, and two weeks of paid annual leave, the Labour Council proceeded to use the site for holiday accommodation. Eight cabins were constructed between 1949 and 1952 and an additional "Vandyke" style cabins between 1950–1953 and in 1990 a managers house was constructed.

=== Protection ===
A group of local residents, led by actor Shane Withington, established the Friends of Currawong to lobby for its protection. In the 1990s, Michael Costa, then secretary of Currawong's owner Unions New South Wales, attempted to lease the land to Maharishi TM Incorporated, a transcendental meditation group. This deal was aborted when a development deadline was missed. In 2007, Currawong was sold to developers Allen Linz for $15 million. The Liberal Party of Australia NSW Division and Pittwater Liberal Candidate Rob Stokes, during the 2007 state election campaign, stated that a NSW Liberal Government would Heritage list the site with a goal of buying the site and gazetting it as part of the Ku-ring-gai Chase National Park. Independent State Member and Mayor of Pittwater Alex McTaggart announced a policy for the council to manage the site on a long-term lease basis.

Following the 2007 NSW state election, newly elected MP Rob Stokes sought assurances from Federal Environment Minister Malcolm Turnbull and NSW State Environmental Minister Phil Koperberg that they would use their statutory powers to protect Currawong. These assurances were given in particularly that a road would not be built through the National Park to link the site with West Head Road, however final say lay with Planning Minister Frank Sartor. On 7 November 2007, the NSW Heritage Council voted to include Currawong on the NSW State Heritage Register, with the listing gazetted on 12 May 2009. Currawong was bought by the State Government in 2011 who announced the creation of Currawong State Park in 2015. "Midholme", the original Currawong homestead built in 1911, was restored in 2014, and in September 2017, the NSW Government announced a $1 million grant for the restoration and modernisation of the remaining 1950s-era cottages.

== Heritage listings ==
Currawong Beach has a number of heritage-listed sites, including:

- Currawong Workers' Holiday Camp

== Gallery ==
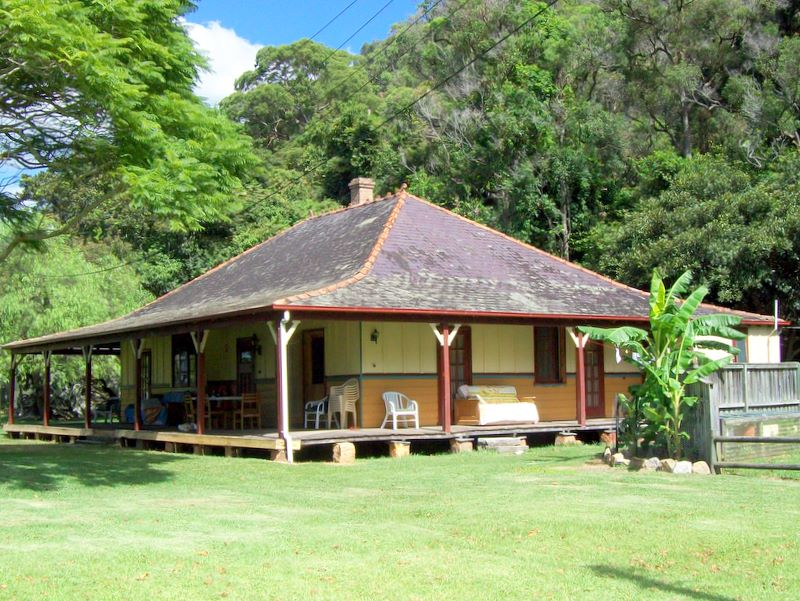
"Africa" built by Dr. Bernard Stiles in 1916–1917 and later renamed "Midholme".

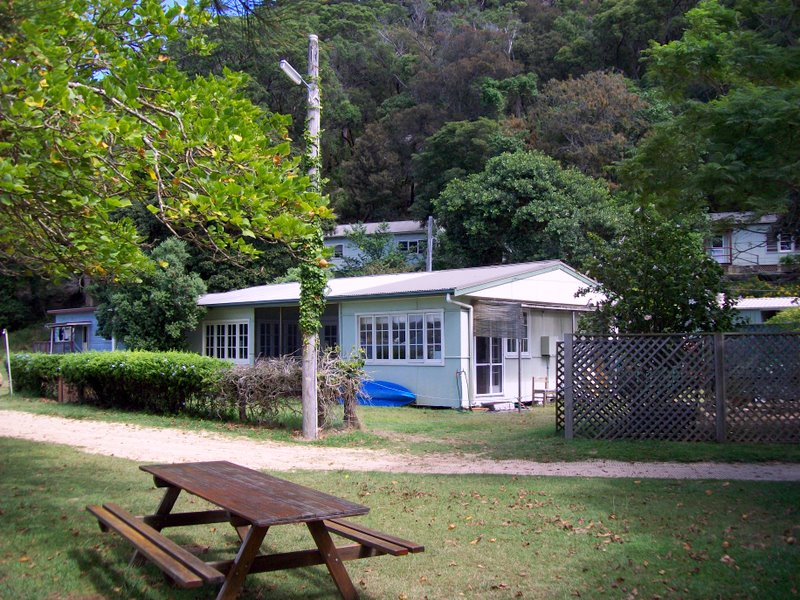
holiday cabins

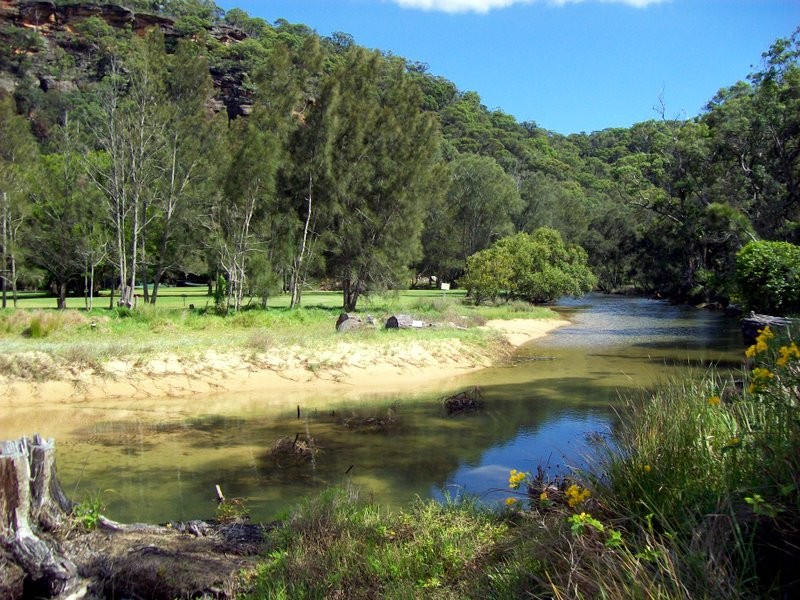
tidal creek at the north of Currawong Beach

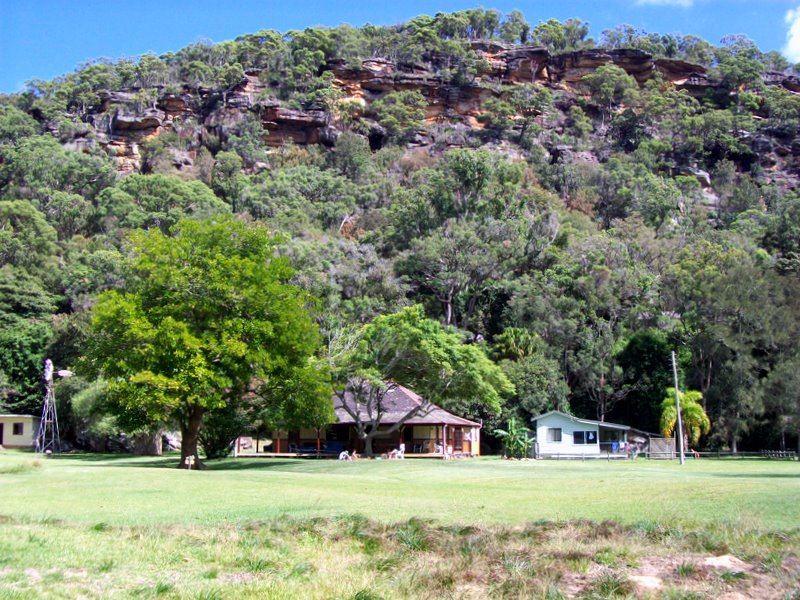
grassy area at Currawong Beach, showing sandstone cliffs in the adjacent Ku-ring-gai Chase National Park
