= Burning Palms =

Burning Palms may refer to:

- Burning Palms (film)
- Burning Palms, New South Wales
