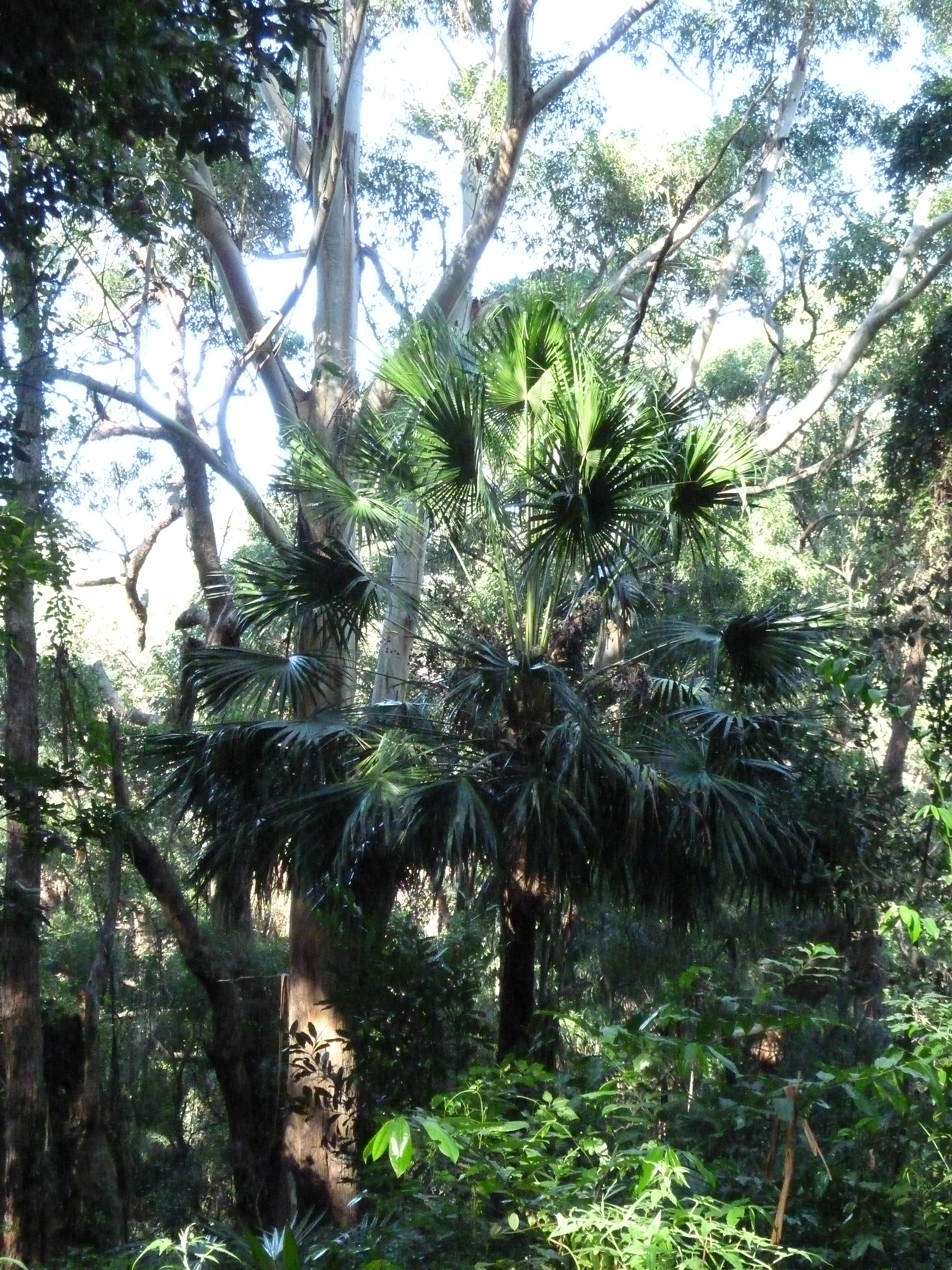

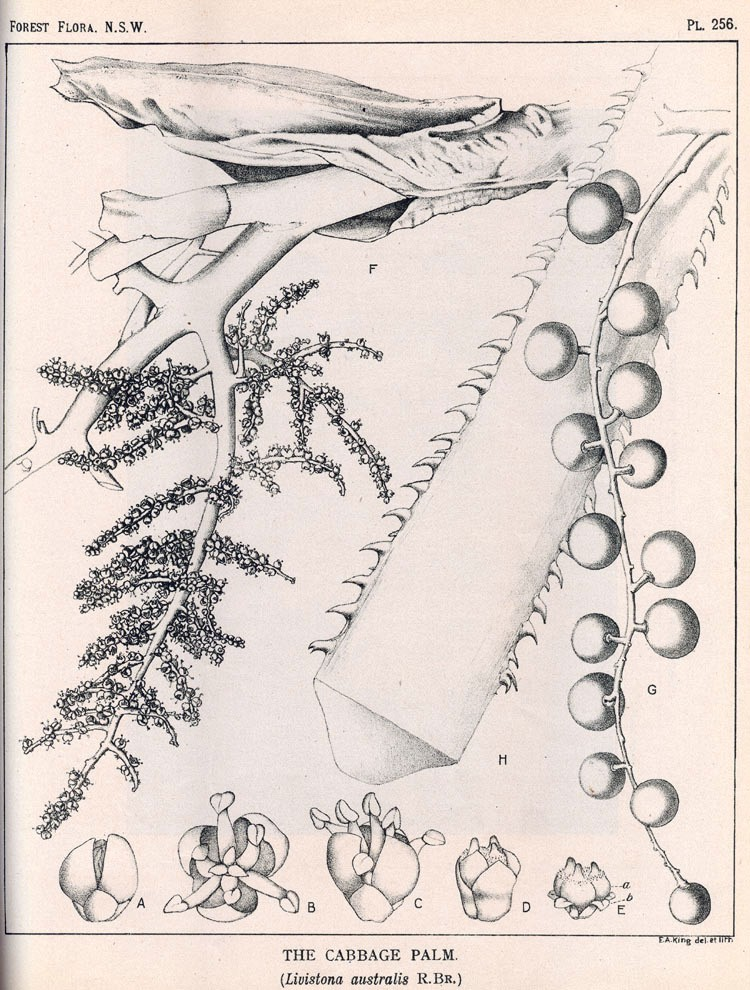

Scientific classification
- Kingdom: Plantae
- Clade: Embryophytes
- Clade: Tracheophytes
- Clade: Spermatophytes
- Clade: Angiosperms
- Clade: Monocots
- Clade: Commelinids
- Order: Arecales
- Family: Arecaceae
- Tribe: Trachycarpeae
- Genus: Livistona
- Species: L. australis

Binomial name
- Livistona australis (R.Br.) Mart.

= Livistona australis =

Species of palm

Livistona australis, the cabbage-tree palm, is an Australian plant species in the family Arecaceae. It is a tall, slender palm growing up to about 25 m in height and 0.35 m diameter. It is crowned with dark, glossy green leaves on petioles 2 m long. It has leaves plaited like a fan; the terminal bud of these is small but sweet. In summer it bears flower spikes with sprigs of cream-white flowers. The trees accumulate dead fronds or leaves, which when the plant is in cultivation are often removed by an arborist.

It is the namesake of the Tharawal people (i.e. after its native name in their language) residing on the coast of present-day Wollongong. Seeking protection from the sun, early European settlers in Australia used fibre from the native palm to create the cabbage tree hat, a distinctive form of headwear during the colonial era.

== Distribution and habitat ==
Mostly this plant is found in moist open forest, often in swampy sites and on margins of rainforests or near the sea. It is widely spread along the New South Wales coast and extends north into Queensland and southwards to eastern Victoria, growing further south than any other native Australian palm.

== Culture ==
The cabbage-tree palm grows best in moist, organically rich soils, and thrives in both sheltered and well-lit situations. It is also salt, frost and wind tolerant, with populations occurring in exposed coastal situations along the east coast of Australia from Queensland to Victoria. The most southerly stand is near Cabbage Tree Creek 30 kilometres east of Orbost, Victoria (37° S).

Reproduction is by seeds. At first the fruit is red, finally turning black, at which point it is ready to be peeled and planted.

== Significance in Aboriginal culture ==
The cabbage-tree palm was called "Dtharowal", where the aforementioned Tharawal language gets its name from. New growth of the tree could be cooked or eaten raw and the heart of the trunk could be cooked as a medicine to ease a sore throat. Leaves of the cabbage-tree palm were used for shelter and fibres for string, rope and fishing lines.

== Gallery ==
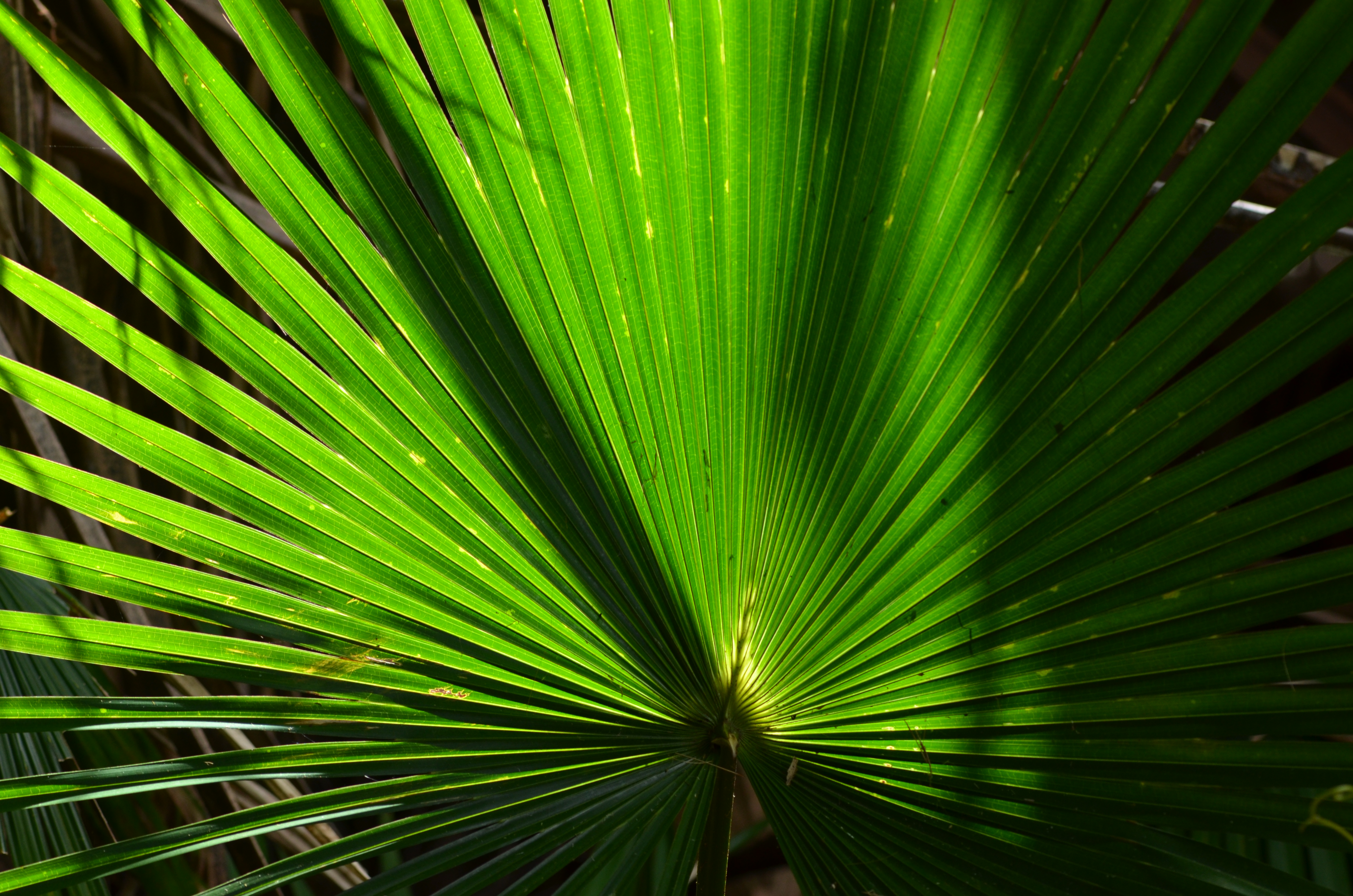
Fan leaf, Burning Palms, New South Wales

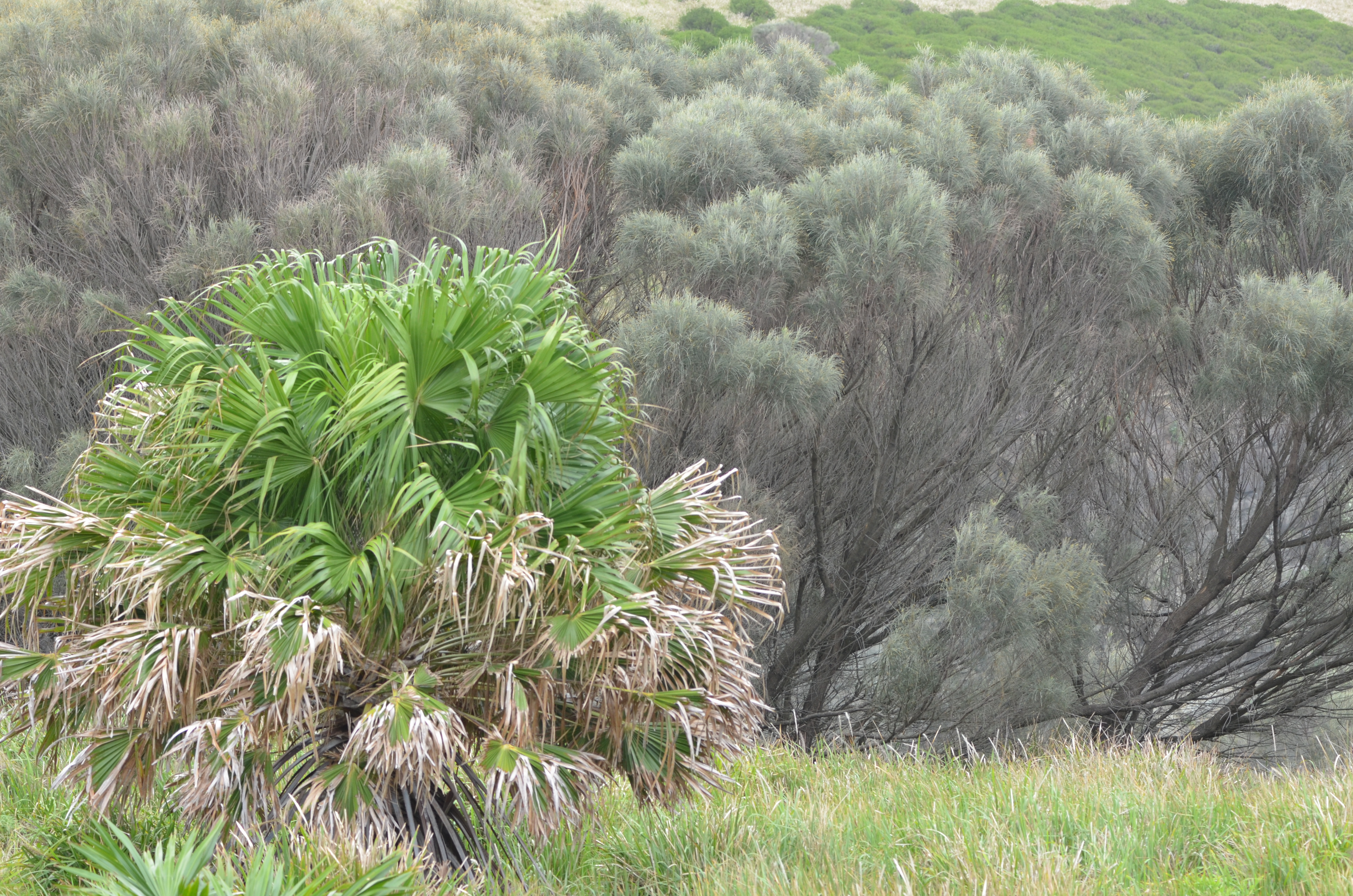
L. australis & casuarinas on a cliff above the sea

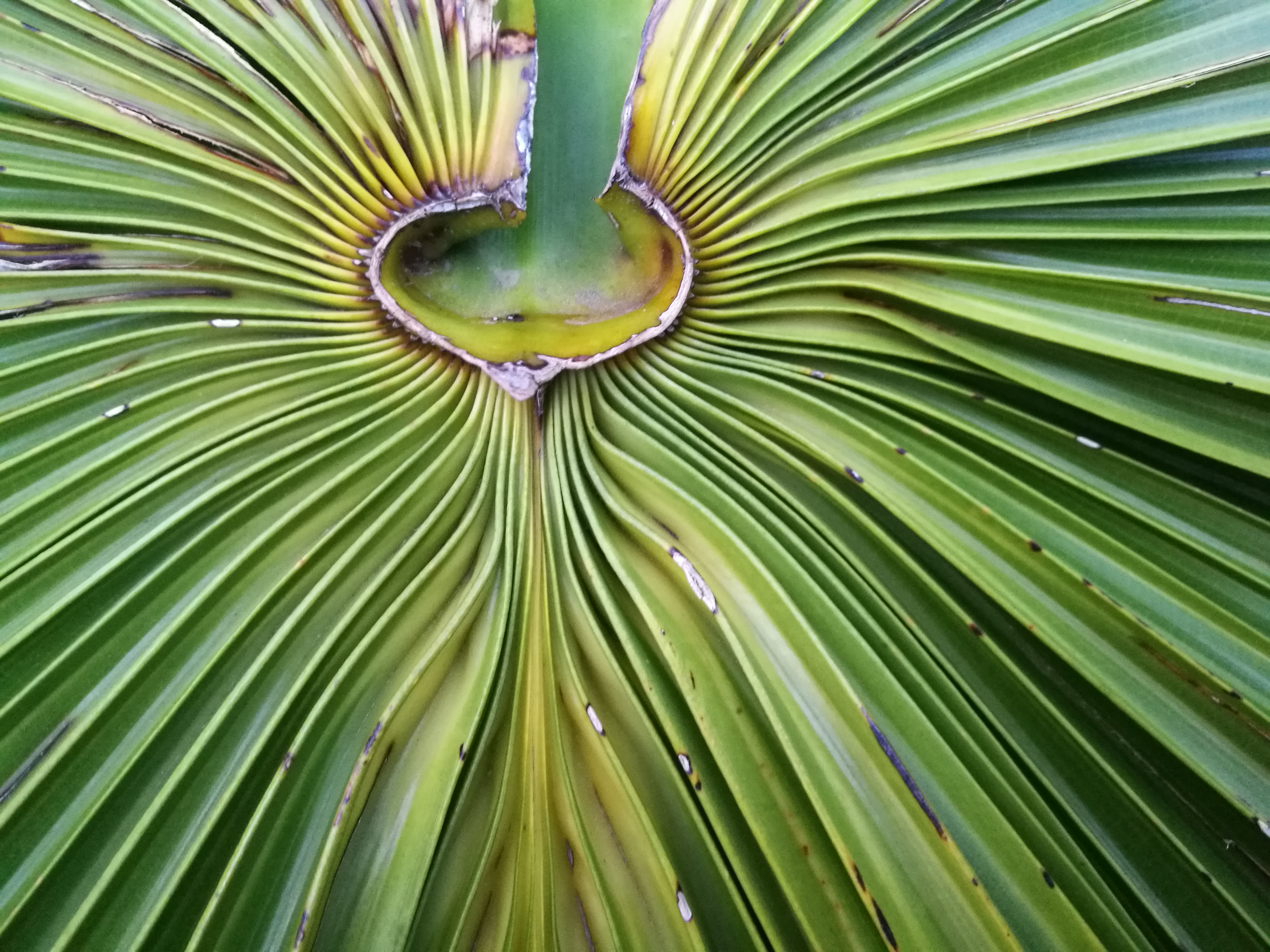
L. australis Leaf detail

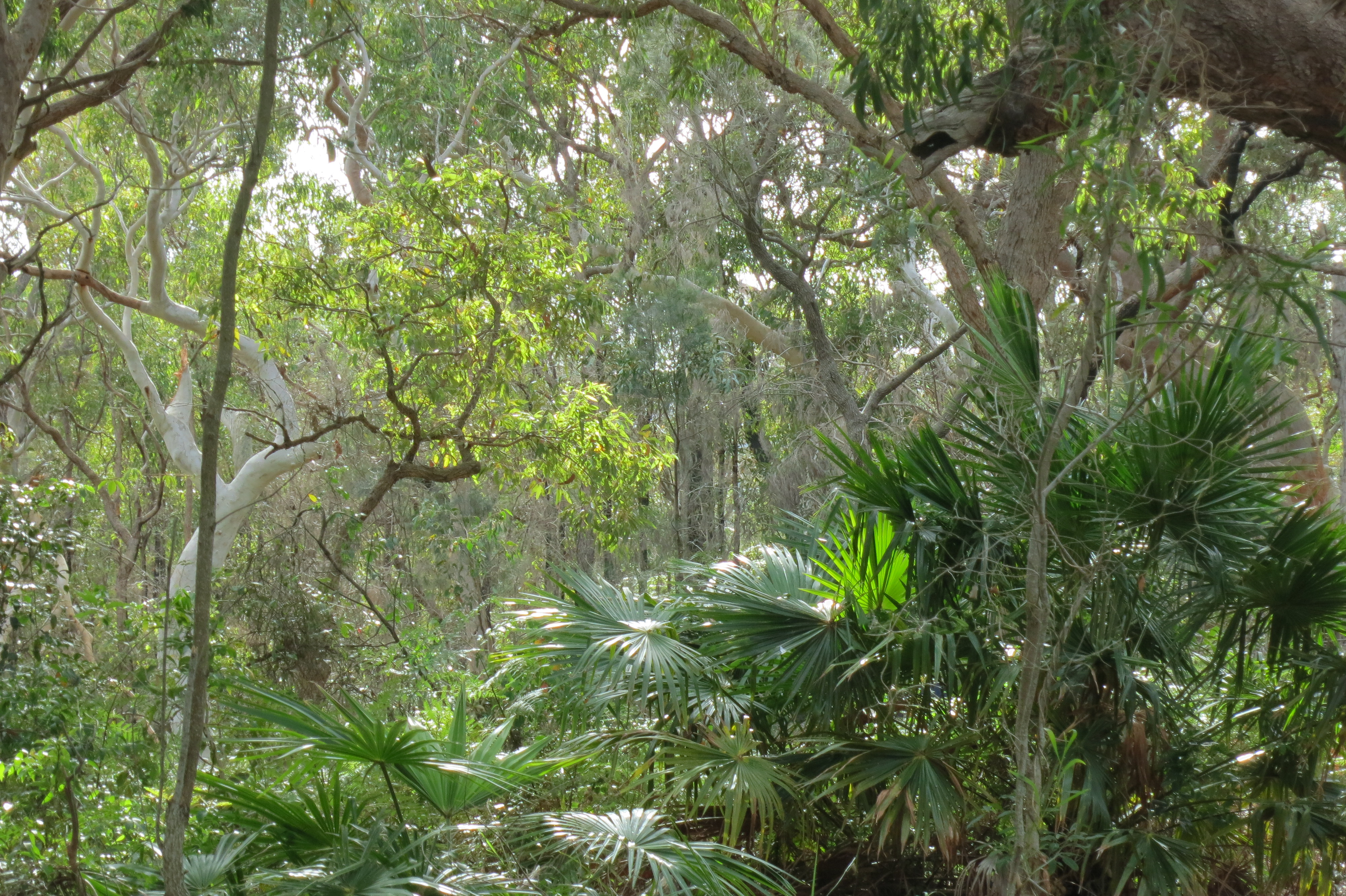
L. australis McKay Reserve, Palm Beach, NSW

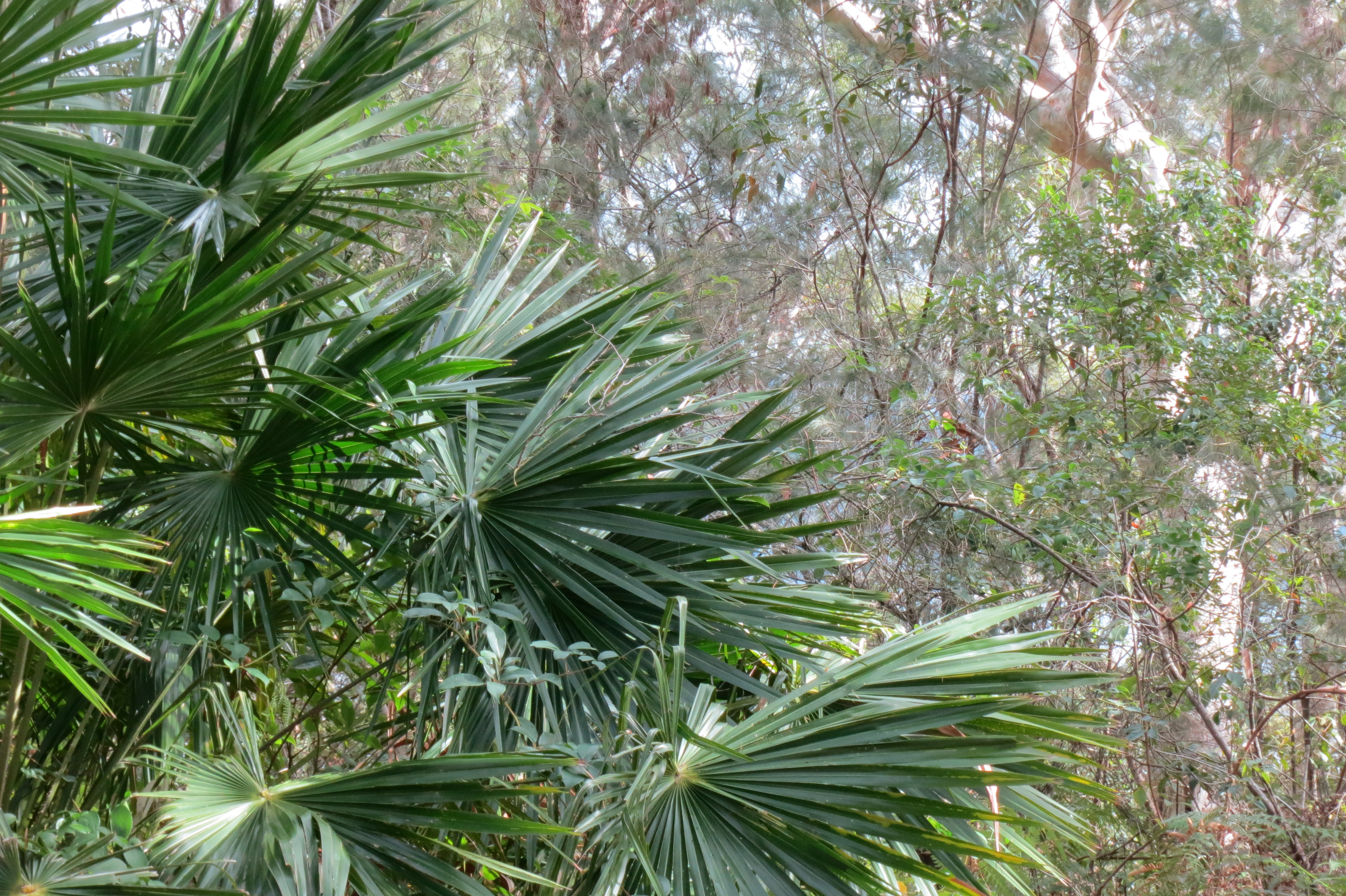
L. australis Ku-ring-gai Chase NP NSW
