= Great Mackerel Beach =

- Suburb
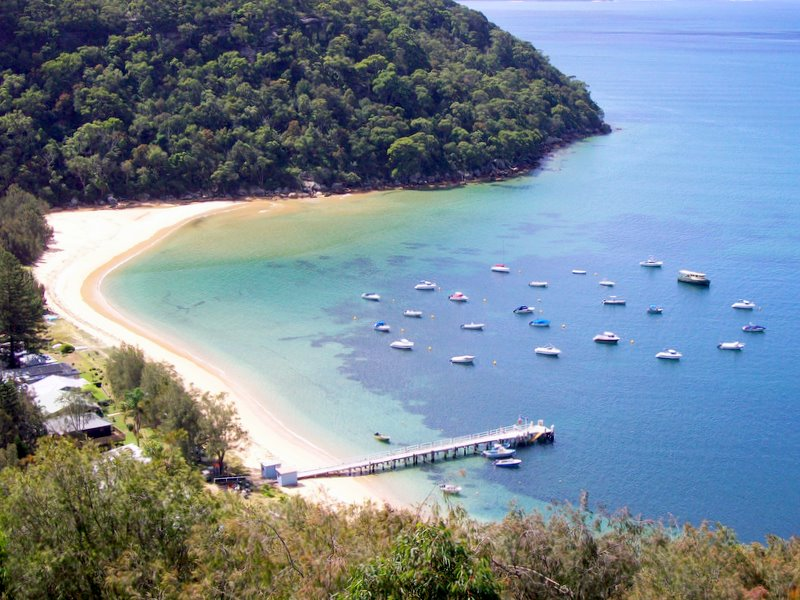
- Great Mackerel Beach, photographed from the south

- Interactive map of Great Mackerel Beach
- Country: Australia
- State: New South Wales
- City: Sydney
- LGA: Northern Beaches Council
- Location: 43 km (27 mi) north of Sydney CBD

Government
  - State electorate: Pittwater
  - Federal division: Mackellar

Population
  - Total: 50 (2021 census)
- Postcode: 2108
Suburbs around Great Mackerel Beach
Ku-ring-gai Chase National Park	Great Mackerel Beach	Palm Beach
	Currawong Beach

Great Mackerel Beach is a suburb about 43 kilometres north of the Sydney central business district, from 2016 in the local government area of Northern Beaches Council, Sydney, New South Wales, Australia, formerly part of Pittwater Council. It is on the western shores of Pittwater in Ku-ring-gai Chase National Park, beside Currawong Beach, and near Coasters Retreat and Palm Beach. The resident population was 50 at the 2021 census; the median age was 57, with an average of 0.3 children per family and an average of 1.7 people per household. The population was 36 at the 2016 census, 301 at the 2011 census, and 103 in 2006. As of 2021 there were 111 private dwellings, with many people not listed as residents occupying properties during school holidays and weekends. Great Mackerel Beach is frequently referred to as Mackerel Beach or [Great] Mackeral Beach, although the spelling "Mackerel" is becoming standard.

A nearby beach is called Little Mackerel Beach, often referred to as Currawong Beach.

== Geography ==
The Mackerel valley was formed by a creek that flows from within the National Park, passing through sub-tropical rain forest and mangroves to exit at the north end of the beach where a sand delta has been formed. The sand on the beach is the result of sandstone flowing down the Hawkesbury River and is soft and golden.

== History ==
Mackerel was originally a dairy farm settled in 1823 by a John Clark who sold it on to Martin Burke who is known as "The Father of Pittwater". Subdivision of Mackerel took place in 1920 and since then over 100 houses have been built. Originally most of the houses were fibro shacks built as fishermen’s cottages and weekenders. However much development has occurred since and now Mackerel has a large variety of homes ranging from some of the original shacks to waterfront mansions.

== Housing ==
At the 2016 census there were 105 dwellings. of which none were apartments, with an average of 2.2 people per occupied dwelling. There are no shops.

Mackerel Beach is largely considered a "holiday home haven", but it is increasingly seen as a beachside suburb, although access to central Sydney CBD requires a boat (private, ferry, water taxi) followed by a 43km road journey.

Median property price fluctuates (statistically, due to the small number of properties), but was around A$550,000 in 2013, significantly higher than the figure for all of NSW.

== Facilities ==
The Northern Beaches Council says "there are no public facilities at Mackerel Beach". Electricity and telephone (and hence Internet) connection are available, but there is no water supply and no sewerage - houses have water tanks to collect rainwater for all purposes, and septic tanks. Residents' rubbish is collected twice weekly from containers at the wharf.

=== Transport ===
Great Mackerel Beach has no road access and no roads or vehicles; access is by the Palm Beach Ferry, water taxi, or private boat. Access to Sydney is normally by a short boat trip to Palm Beach, then a 43km journey by car or bus. Cars may be left parked near the ferry terminal at Palm Beach.

=== Public facilities ===
There are no public facilities for use by visitors or residents at Great Mackerel Beach, no shops, public toilets, barbecue or picnic facilities, or availability of drinking water. There is a public telephone booth near the wharf. Residents' rubbish is collected twice weekly, but there is no public facility. Palm Beach, a short boat ride away, has a few shops, and there are more comprehensive shops further away in the surrounding area.

=== Recreational boating ===
While many residents have boats, there are no moorings available for visiting recreational boating at Great Mackerel Beach, including no Commercial/Club (orange) or Courtesy (pink) moorings. Visiting recreational boats may not tie-up on Great Mackerel Beach Wharf. Private (yellow) moorings may not be used by non-owners and may not be sublet or traded in any way.

== Community ==
=== MBA ===
The Mackerel Beach Association is a group of about sixty-five property-owners who represent the wider community (especially with Council) on parking, garbage collection, and other issues of import to the community.

=== Pet animals ===
Due to its position bordering the Ku-ring-gai National Park, pet dogs have historically been prohibited from Mackerel Beach, as they are at The Basin and Currawong and other communities positioned along the western foreshores of Pittwater. Mackerel Beach is a Wildlife Protection Area (WPA); a major concern is protection of indigenous wildlife.

In 2007 some residents asked the MBA for a leash-free area on the south end of the beach. This was rejected by the MBA at the AGM; the residents then raised the request with Pittwater Council, which decided to run a six-month trial of a Public Dog Exercise Area (PDEA) at the north end of the beach. Many residents disagreed with this decision. The area defined by the PDEA prohibited dogs from being walked past the northernmost house, where the Ku-ring-gai Chase National Park begins, home to many species of native mammals, reptiles and birds.

In 2008 the National Parks and Wildlife Service submitted a report to Pittwater Council that advised against a PDEA at Mackerel Beach.

In December 2009 Pittwater Council resolved to permanently allow dogs off leads at Mackerel Beach between the public wharf north to the last house/National Park boundary, at certain times and with restrictions. The regulations are difficult to enforce in sparsely-populated and isolated Mackerel Beach. A man was injured by an attack from a dog on a leash in 2012. Cats are prohibited in WPAs; Northern Beaches Council banned pet cats from Mackerel Beach due to their impact on the native wildlife.
