= Coasters Retreat =

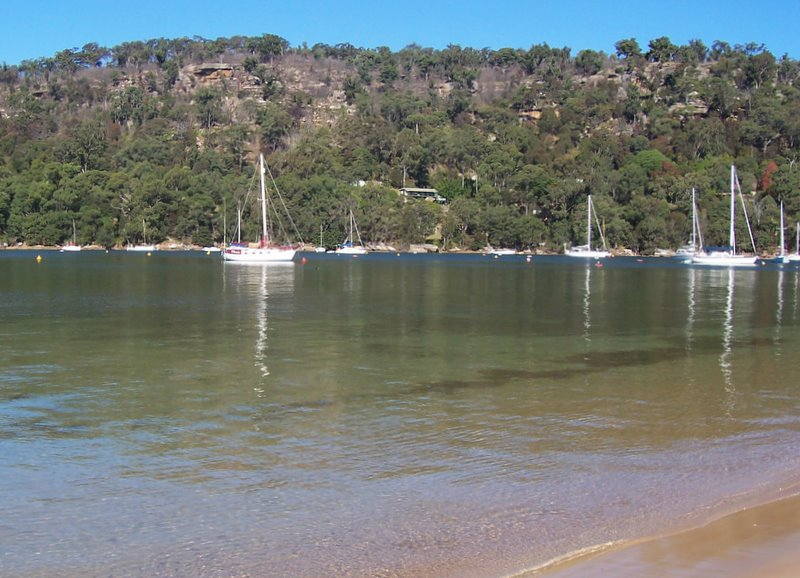

- Interactive map of Coasters Retreat
- Country: Australia
- State: New South Wales
- City: Sydney
- LGA: Northern Beaches Council
- Location: 42 km (26 mi) north of Sydney CBD

Government
  - State electorate: Pittwater
  - Federal division: Mackellar

Population
  - Total: 30 (2021 census)
- Postcode: 2108
Localities around Coasters Retreat
	Pittwater	Pittwater
Ku-ring-gai Chase National Park	Coasters Retreat	Ku-ring-gai Chase National Park
Ku-ring-gai Chase National Park	Ku-ring-gai Chase National Park	Ku-ring-gai Chase National Park

Coasters Retreat is a road-inaccessible suburb in northern Sydney, in the state of New South Wales, Australia, 42 kilometres north of the Sydney central business district, in the local government area of Northern Beaches Council.

== Location ==
Coasters Retreat is an enclave within Ku-ring-gai Chase National Park, on the western shores of Pittwater looking northward toward the Basin. Coasters is made up of fifty holiday houses set in the bush and beside the beach. Two of them date from settlement in 1922–1924. Coasters Retreat has no road or land access and is entirely dependent on transport via the Palm Beach Ferry Service. Coasters Retreat is serviced by two wharves, and a rural fire brigade.

== History ==
The area was first inhabited by Indigenous Australians, the Kuringgai (also spelt Ku-ring-gai, Kuring-gai, Guringai). The Kuringgai were hunters and gatherers. The Basin, adjoining Coasters Retreat, has particularly rich Aboriginal Heritage sites including the Basin Track Engraving Site, featuring petroglyphs of hunters, kangaroos, fishing and wallabies. On the headland north of Coasters Retreat is the Red Hands Cave, featuring a hand print in red ochre. Other hand prints, pictographs, middens and carvings can be found in the locality. On the foreshore at Coasters Retreat is an Aboriginal carving of a dolphin.

In 1770 Captain Cook sighted Broken Bay, naming it for its rugged terrain. Pittwater was first explored by Governor Arthur Phillip in 1788, who named it after British Prime Minister William Pitt. Pittwater was again charted in 1789 by Captain John Hunter. In 1842 Coasters Retreat was first granted to a former soldier of the NSW Army Corps by Governor Gipps, who gave his name to "Soldiers Point" on the western extremity of the south headland, with agriculture beginning on a small scale. A farmhouse was built at The Basin in 1881.

Coasters Retreat became enclosed by Ku-Ring-Gai Chase National Park following its establishment in 1896. In 1914 Bonnie Doon Wharf was built by the Ku-Ring-Gai Chase National Park to provide access for campers and visitors.

The oldest house, Negunya, was built by the Norton Russell family in 1922, and the second oldest house was built by the Alldrit Family in 1926, following a 1921 subdivision of the original land grant. The area underwent subtle growth during the 20th century with the construction of holiday houses. In 1944 Bennetts Wharf was constructed, following further subdivisions. After the Coasters Retreat Progress Association succeeded in connecting to the electricity supply in 1967, the Association became dedicated to the preservation of the unique coastal environment at Coasters Retreat. Electricity lines were hidden underground, road building never initiated, fences not allowed, and communal postal services maintained in order to promote a tranquil non-suburban environment. Subsequently, a Rural Fire Brigade was formed, protecting the community in 1994 from bushfires.
