= Burning Palms, New South Wales =

Burning Palms New South Wales
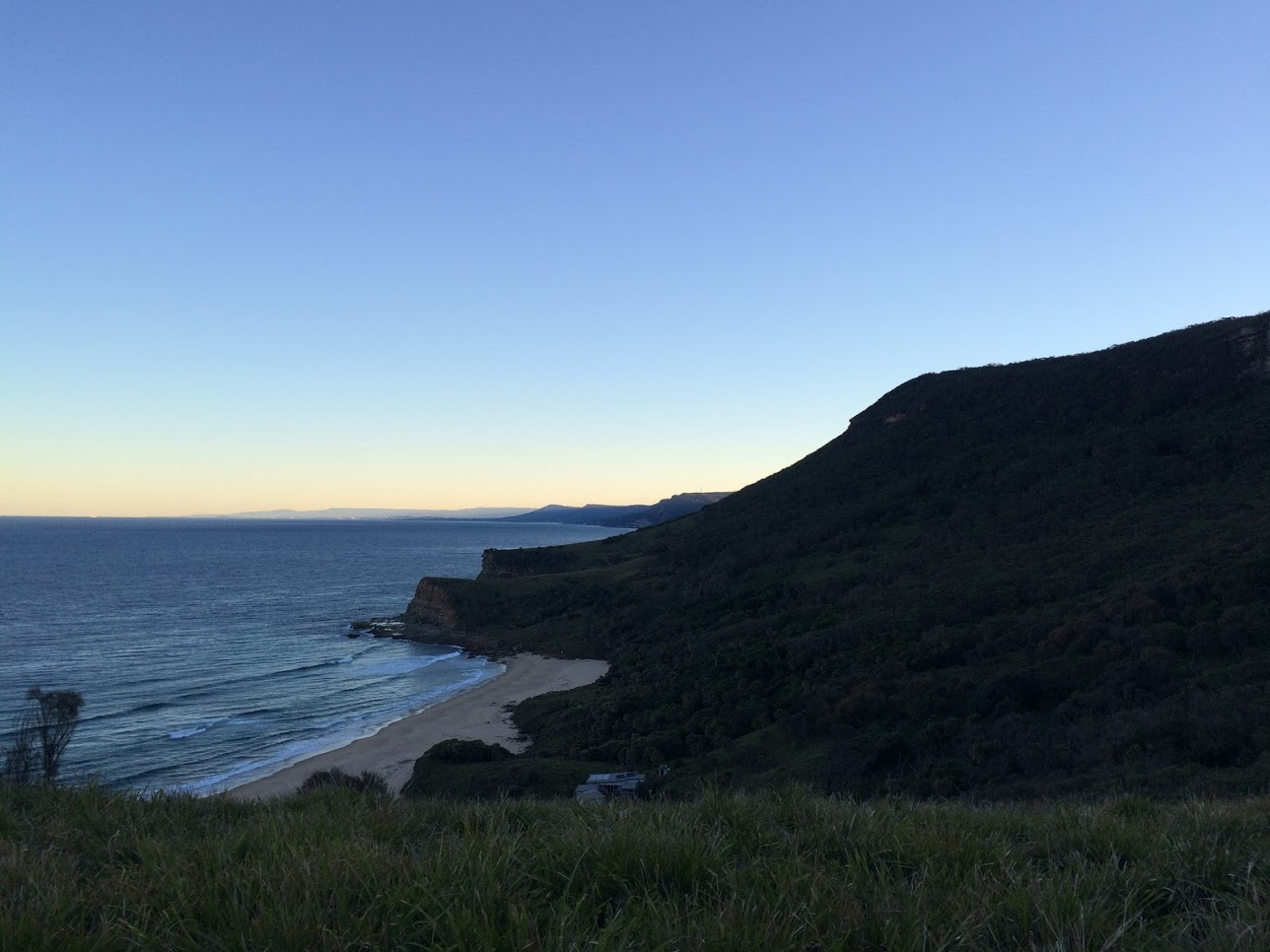
- Southwestern view of the beach from Burgh Ridge Track

- Coordinates: 34°11′S 151°03′E
- Postcode(s): 2508
- LGA(s): City of Wollongong
- State electorate(s): Heathcote
- Federal division(s): Cunningham

Burning Palms is an unbounded neighbourhood within the locality of Lilyvale and a beach in the Royal National Park, Wollongong, south of Sydney, New South Wales, Australia.

It is accessed via a very steep, moderately difficult walk down (and up) the mountain through forest and grass plains. It is located in the area known as the Garawarra.

Together with Little Garie and Era, the neighbourhood was added to the New South Wales State Heritage Register on 27 April 2012 as part of the Royal National Park Coastal Cabin Communities.
