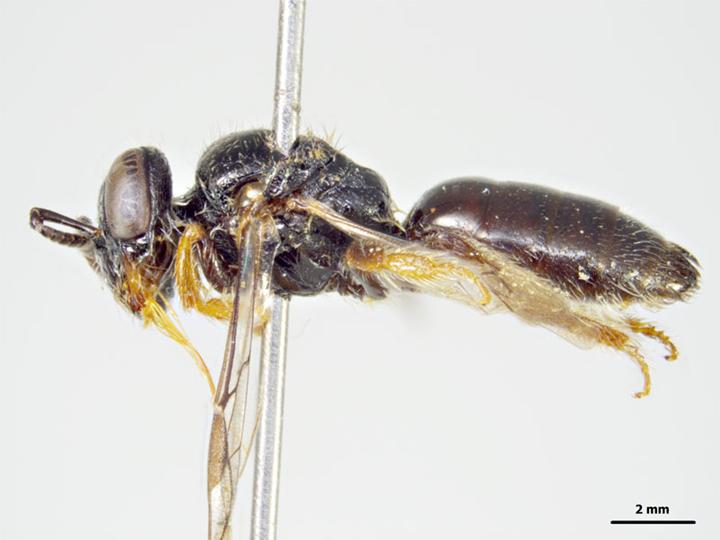
- Female

Scientific classification
- Kingdom: Animalia
- Phylum: Arthropoda
- Clade: Pancrustacea
- Class: Insecta
- Order: Hymenoptera
- Family: Colletidae
- Genus: Leioproctus
- Species: L. hamatus

Binomial name
- Leioproctus hamatus Maynard 1994

= Leioproctus hamatus =

Species of bee

Leioproctus hamatus, or Leioproctus (Filiglossa) hamatus, is a species of bee in the family Colletidae and subfamily Colletinae. It is endemic to Australia. It was described by Australian entomologist Glynn Maynard in 1994.

== Etymology ==
The specific epithet hamatus (Latin: "hooked") is an anatomical reference to the structure at the base of the mandibles.

== Description ==
Female body length is 5.5 mm. Integumental colouration is mainly black.

== Distribution and habitat ==
The species occurs in New South Wales. The type locality is Lady Carrington Drive, Royal National Park, Sydney.

== Behaviour ==
The adults are flying mellivores. Flowering plants visited by the bees include Persoonia species.
