= Wedding Cake Rock =

Rock formation that looks like a wedding cake

Coordinates: 34°06′34.8″S 151°09′08.7″E

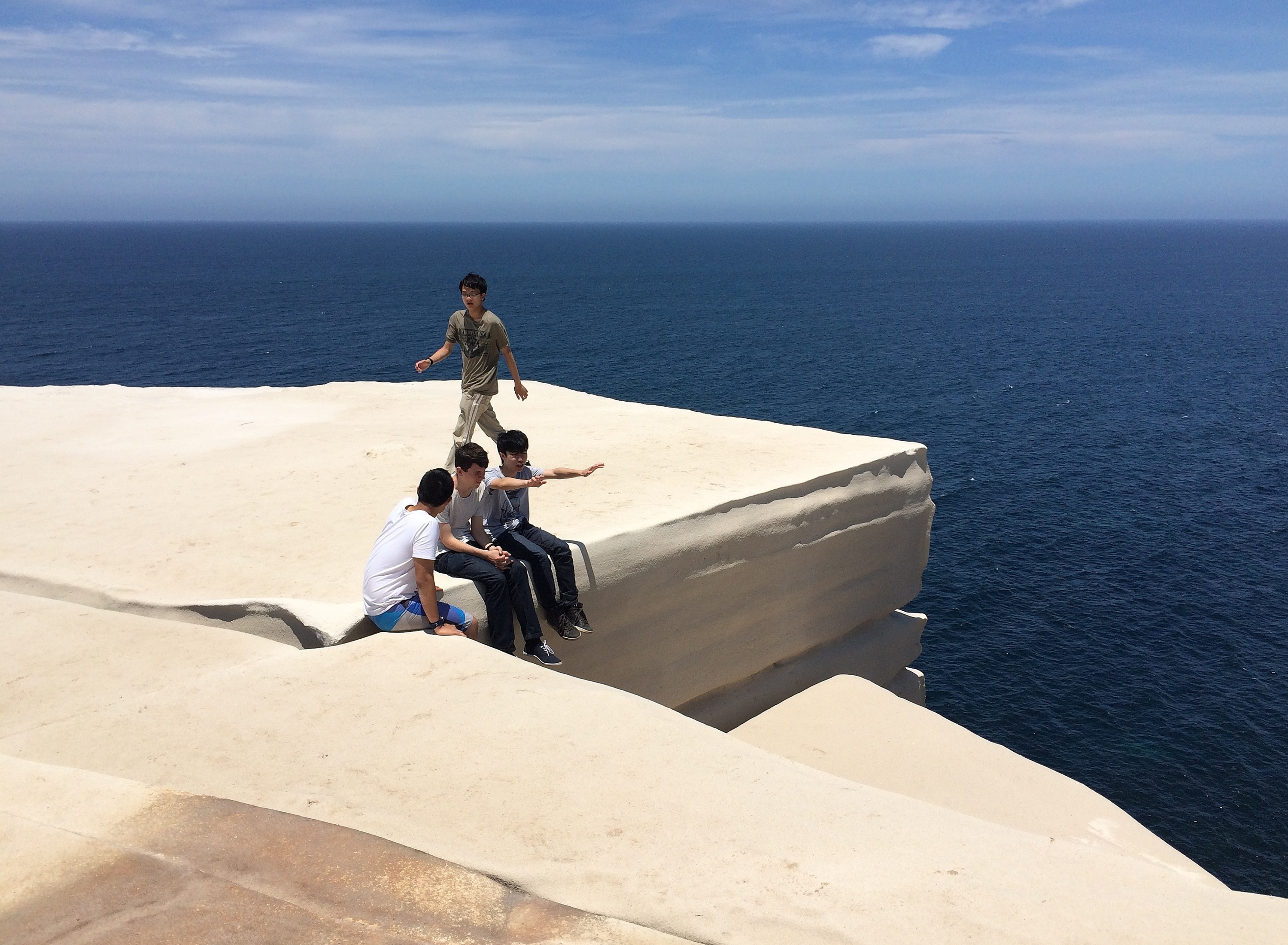
Visitors interacting with Wedding Cake Rock, pictured in December 2014, prior to the landmark’s closure to the public.

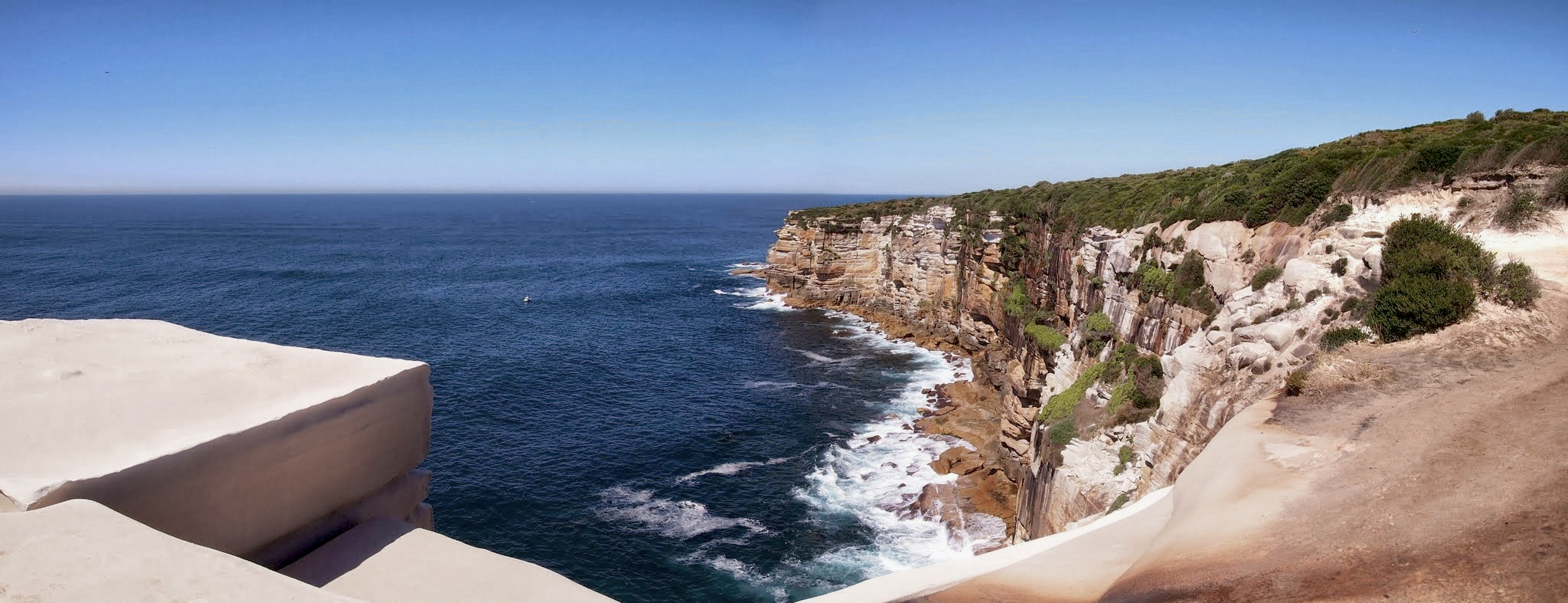
Panoramic view of Wedding Cake Rock's surrounds. The sandstone composition of the rock is distinct from surrounding cliffs.

Wedding Cake Rock, also known as White Rock, is a sandstone rock formation located in the Royal National Park near Bundeena in Sydney, New South Wales, Australia, accessible via the Royal National Park Coast Track. The rock is one of many formations that appear north of Marley Beach, and is suspended 25 metres (82 ft) above sea level. Wedding Cake Rock is noted for its scenic location and popularity with bushwalkers and tourists, as an attractive location for photography. Its reputation, however, was damaged after the landmark saw a sudden spike in popularity in 2015, and subsequently fell victim to vandalism. The rock was closed off from public access in May 2015 by the New South Wales National Parks and Wildlife Service, citing the dangerous behavior of recent visitors, and later, safety concerns, after a survey conducted the following month determined that the rock was unstable, and that it would collapse into the Tasman Sea within the next decade.

== Summary ==
Wedding Cake Rock earned its name from its resemblance to a slice of a wedding cake; the feature shows layers and is unusually eroded into a perfectly cuboid shape, in addition to being white, similar to a wedding cake. The feature is one of many formations between Bundeena and Marley Beach, including The Balcony (Bundeena Lookout) and the adjacent "White Cliffs" of Marley. Before its closure from the public, travellers to Wedding Cake Rock were often advised not to stand near the edge of the cliff, mainly due to regularly strong winds. The rock can be reached by the Royal National Park Coast Track, a walking trail through the park that spans the entire length of the park's coastline, from Bundeena to Otford. Wedding Cake Rock is situated 5.1 kilometres (3.2 mi) from the start of the trail at Bundeena.

== Contemporary history ==
There has been one death at Wedding Cake Rock that has not been the result of erosion. A 24 year old French tourist and amateur climber jumped from the lower tier to grab the upper tier, but slipped on impact, lost traction, and fell more than 40 meters to his death.

=== Closure and aftermath ===
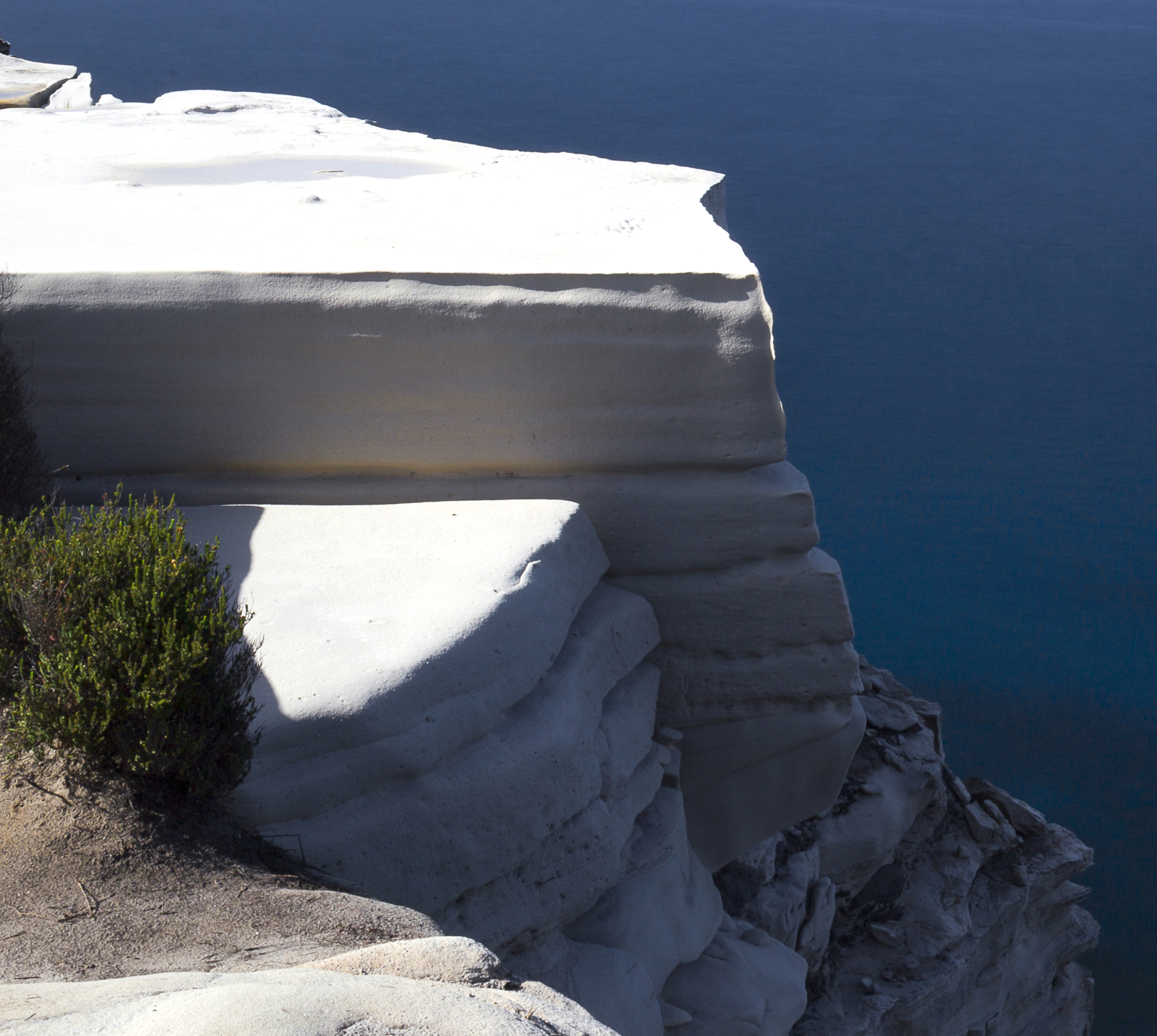
Southern view of part of the rock's structure in May 2016, showing visible signs of erosion underneath. Concerns about the rock's stability led to the landmark's closure by the NPWS the previous year.

In early 2015, Wedding Cake Rock saw a sudden spike in popularity. The New South Wales National Parks and Wildlife Service (NPWS) reported the number of visitors per month on the Royal National Park Coast Track had sharply risen from the average of 2,000 per month to over 10,000. The social media photo sharing service Instagram has been cited as the cause for the growth in patronage, with users going to the landmark to take pictures on top of it, often while performing a stunt. The spike in popularity became concerning for the NPWS, whose regional manager, Gary Dunnett, questioned, "whether having 30 or 40 people standing on that area has the potential to tip it one way or the other". The site was closed off in May 2015, citing the aforementioned safety concerns. After the closure, a geotechnical assessment and evaluation of Wedding Cake Rock was conducted to determine the stability of the landmark. The study found, to the NPWS' surprise, that the formation was not only unstable, but was certain to collapse at any time within the next ten years, with the entire structure being described as "precariously balancing on the edge of the cliff, and severely undercut", seeming to be only upheld by very few pieces of debris from a recent major fracture below the rock.

The closure of the landmark, however, did not deter visitors from jumping the safety fence established nearby and continuing to take photographs atop the unstable formation, prompting the NPWS to issue a $300 fine for visitors who do so, effective in late March 2016. This also did not prevent further instances of visitors jumping the fence, leading to the NPWS to collaborate with the New South Wales Police Force to start patrolling the area; an operation which began in June 2016. By July 2016 six fines had been officially issued by the NPWS since the rock's closure, with seven more being issued by July 2018. The rock will remain closed to the public until its eventual demise, though proposals by the NPWS advised establishing a permanent viewing platform near the landmark. As part of the New South Wales Government's 2016-17 state budget, the proposal was fully funded as part of a $9 million "windfall" granted to the NPWS over the subsequent 4-year period to upgrade the Royal National Park Coast Track.

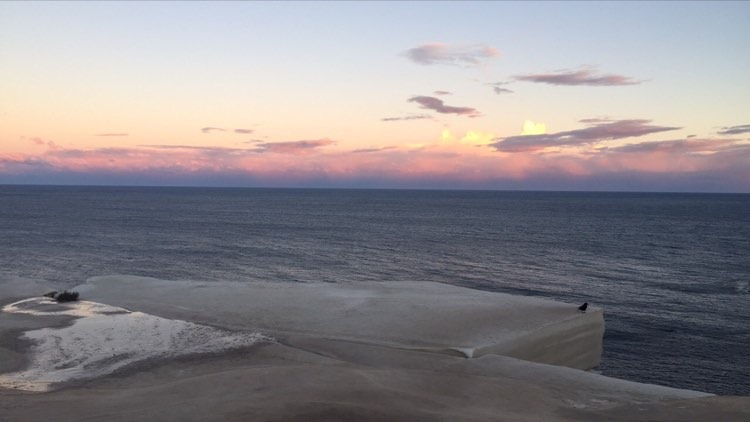
Sunset with a top view of Wedding Cake Rock in July 2017.

== See also ==
- Ruined Castle - another high-altitude rock formation, located in the Blue Mountains National Park.
- London Bridge (Victoria) - a rock formation in the Port Campbell National Park that partly collapsed into the sea.
