= Garie Beach =

Beach in New South Wales, Australia

- Beach
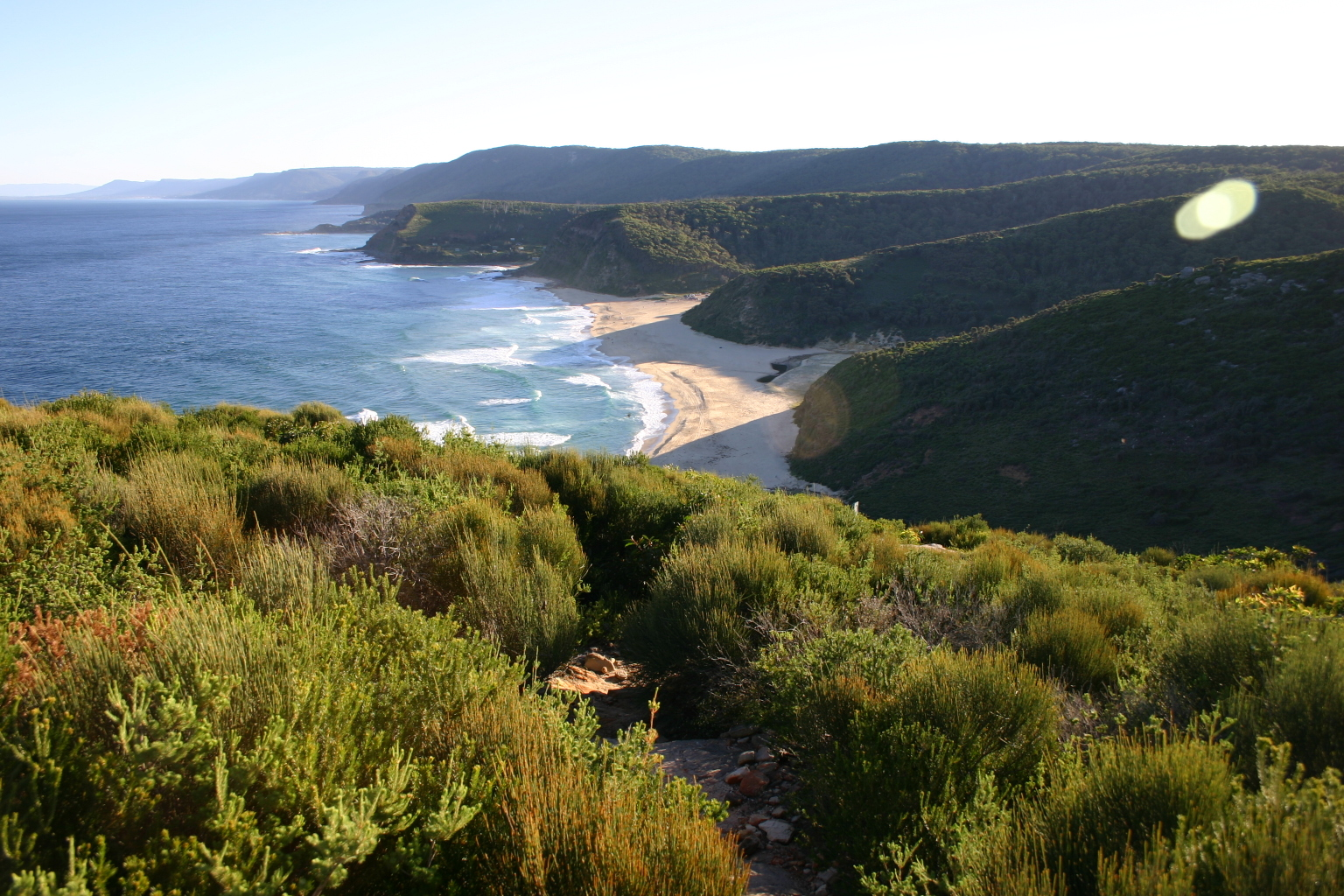
- View of Garie Beach from the Royal National Park Coast Trail, looking south
- Interactive map of Garie Beach
- Coordinates: 34°10′13″S 151°04′03″E
- Location: Royal National Park, Sydney, New South Wales, Australia

Dimensions
  - Length: 900 m (3,000 ft)
- Patrolled by: Garie Surf Life Saving Club
- Hazard rating: 7/10 (highly hazardous)
- Access: Garie Road (road); Royal National Park Coast Track (foot)

Garie
- Full name: Garie Surf Life Saving Club
- Founded: 1938; 88 years ago
- Colors: Blue Red
- Website: garieslsc.com.au

Uniforms

Garie Beach is a patrolled beach in the lower Royal National Park, on the outskirts of southern Sydney in New South Wales, Australia. The beach is one of eleven beaches located within the Royal National Park and is the southernmost beach in the Greater Sydney Metropolitan area. It is also one of three patrolled beaches in the park, with the Garie Surf Life Saving Club patrolling the beach on weekends and paid lifeguards from ALS Australian Lifeguard Services patrolling on weekdays during the summer school holidays.

== History ==
There are two theories of the origins of the name. Garie is a Dharawal word meaning "sleepy". The name could also be a deviation of the name of a bushranger called Geaty, who camped here.

The beach was used as a location for the 1954 film Long John Silver.

== Facilities ==
Garie Beach is accessible via Garie Road, and has a carpark. It has no barbecue but has toilets, a surf safety centre, a kiosk, and a picnic area. A youth hostel was previously nearby, but burnt down in December 2010 and has not been rebuilt.

== Redevelopment ==
The construction of the Garie Beach Surf Safety Centre is one component of a larger planning and construction program to improve the Garie Beach Valley for the enjoyment of beach users. Stage 1 was completed in June 2005 and included the construction of a 175-space carpark, and the restoration of the creek line and the beach foredune.

Stage 2 involved designing, developing and constructing the Garie Beach Surf Safety Centre, landscaped forecourt, and picnic areas. Once completed, the centre will contain public showers and toilets, a first-aid room, a kiosk, boat and equipment storage, a radio room, and meeting rooms and office space for the Garie Surf Life Saving Club and Garie Boardriders Club. Because there is no electricity, no sewerage system, and no mains water in the Garie Valley, the centre will be solar powered, and will include a low-flush hybrid treatment system to provide flushing toilets using on-site biological treatment. Rainwater storage tanks will hold 31,600 litres of rainwater to provide showers for beach users.

== Surfing ==
Garie Beach has some of the best surfing waves in Sydney and is a very popular family beach destination. The Garie Surf Life Saving Club will provide an essential community service in helping to keep the public safe at the beach. Garie is home to the Garie Boardriders Club. Garie Boardriders has an active membership of just over 100 members on average and has been continually running as a boardriders club since 1978. In 2014, the club's books listed more than 700 members and a lot of older members are returning to compete in the senior and masters divisions.

Garie Boardriders is affiliated with the Surfing Illawarra, Surfing NSW and Surfing Australia. Garie's members have competed up to Australia Titles level as well as a couple who competed at APSA and more recently ACC level.

The most recent surfing photographs from Garie Boardriders competitions are posted on
