= Marley Beach =

Beach in New South Wales, Australia

- Beach
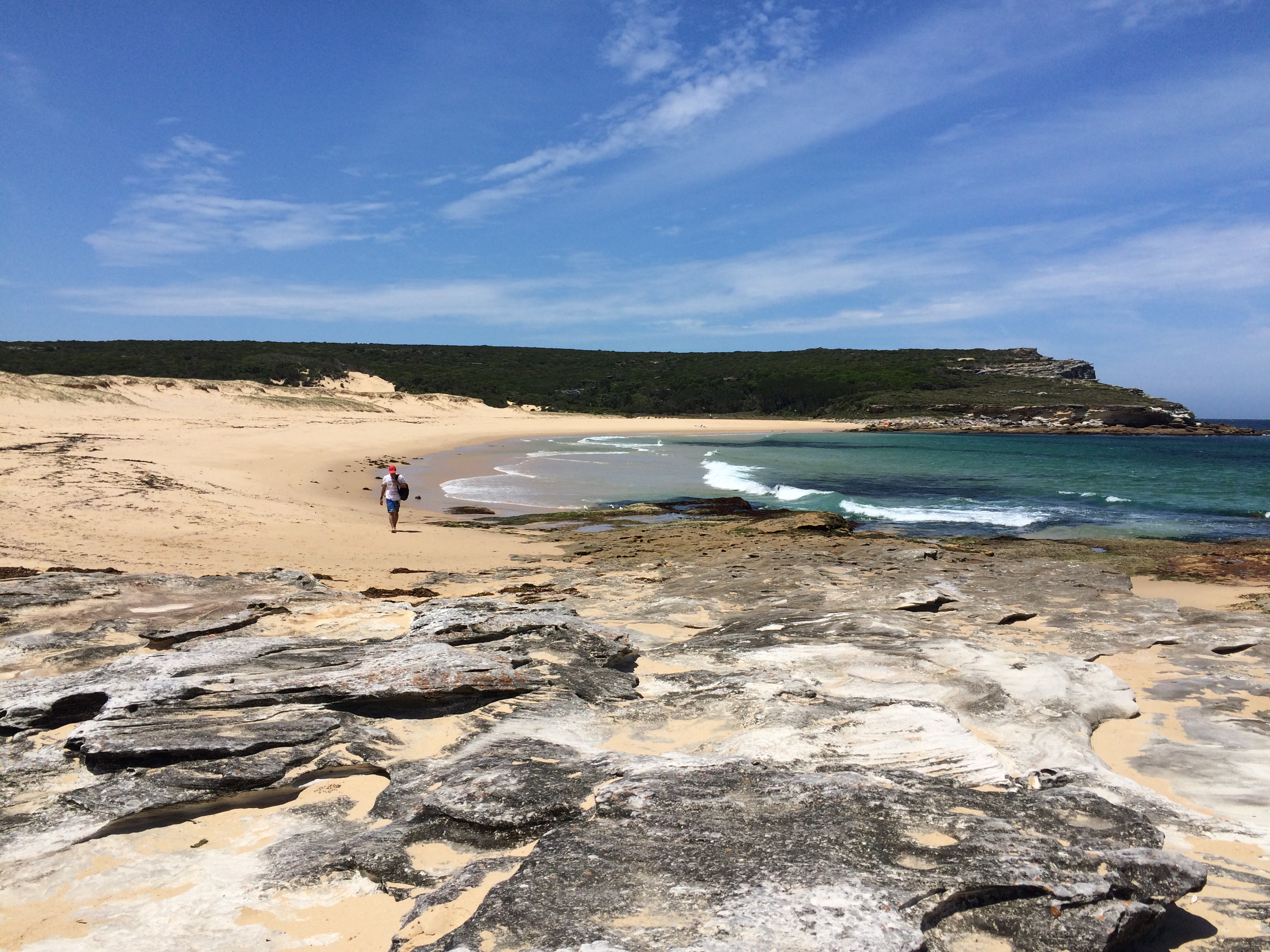
- View across Marley Beach looking northeast
- Interactive map of Marley Beach
- Coordinates: 34°06′56″S 151°08′28″E
- Location: Royal National Park, New South Wales, Australia

Dimensions
  - Length: 360 m
- Hazard rating: 7/10 (highly hazardous)
- Access: Royal National Park Coast Track (foot)

Marley Beach (also known as Big Marley Beach) is an unpatrolled beach in the upper Royal National Park, on the outskirts of southern Sydney, Australia. The beach is one of eleven beaches located within the territory of the Royal National Park. Marley is considered by Surf Life Saving Australia as the most hazardous unpatrolled beach in the park, and both surfing and swimming are not advised by both SLSA and the New South Wales National Parks and Wildlife Service. One of the largest beaches in the Sydney metropolitan area, Marley is also notable for the expansive sand dunes that lie behind the beach, which take up over 130,000 square meters.

== History ==
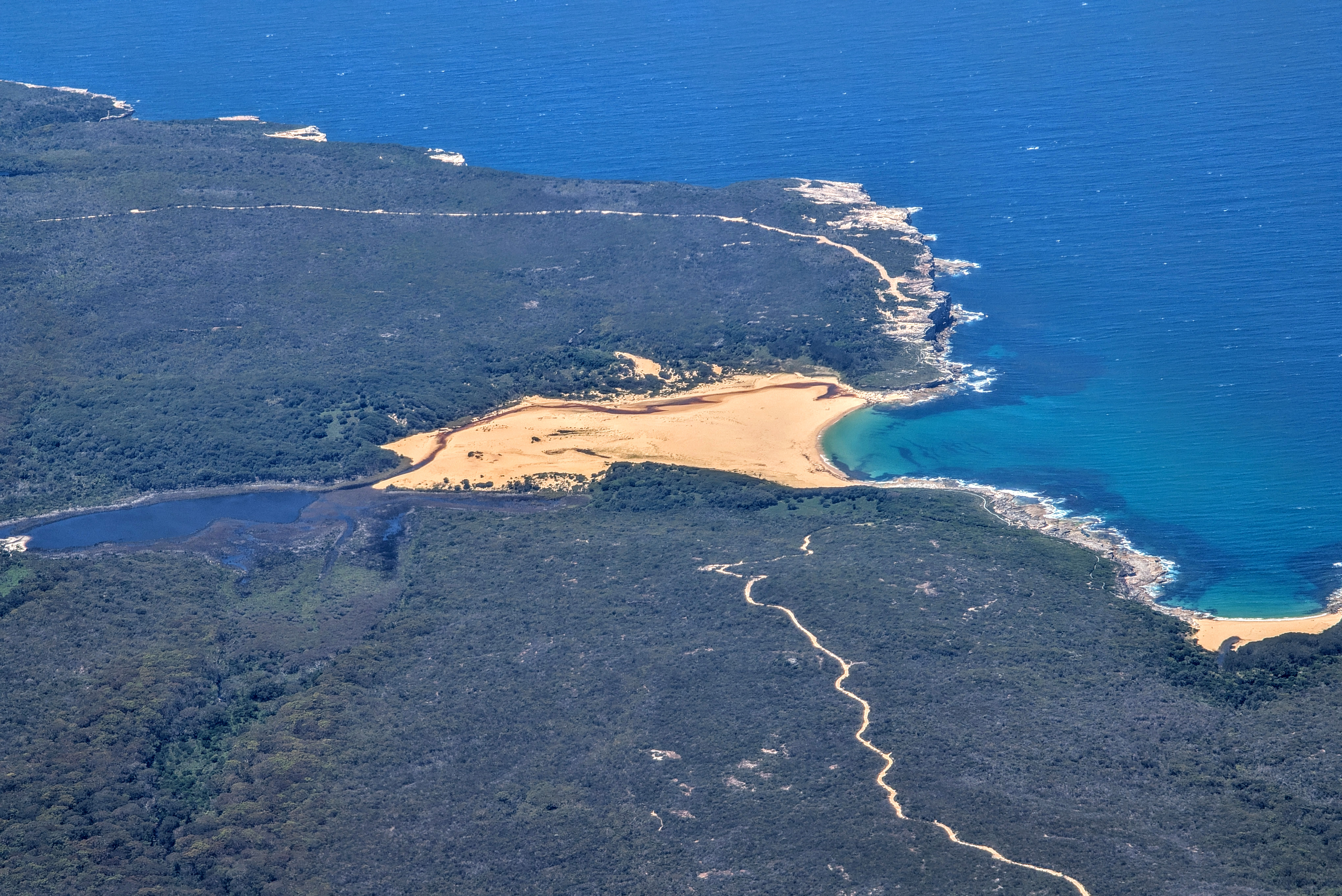
Aerial view of Marley Beach and Little Marley Beach

Both Marley Beach and Little Marley Beach are remnants of a large chain of beaches that existed along the northern coast of the Royal National Park around 7000 years ago, with sand dunes that were as high as the cliffs that exist today. Sand dunes still exist to the north of Marley, near other famous landmarks in the region such as Wedding Cake Rock and the Bundeena Lookout.

On 13 February 1898, during a gale, while her captain was attempting to run her onto Marley Beach, the small coastal steamer, Marion Fenwick, ran aground on a nearby rock shelf and was wrecked, but without loss of life.

On 16 May 1919, a steam powered 'sixty-miler' collier, the S.S. Tuggerah, ran into a violent storm, and capsized around 2 kilometers off the coast near Marley Beach. Six crew, including the ship's captain, died while eleven survivors rowed a lifeboat to Port Hacking. The shipwreck, rediscovered in 1972, has since become one of the more popular diving spots off the Sydney coastline, though due to the depth of the dive (75 metres), experience is recommended for people wanting to attempt a dive.

== Overview ==
Marley Beach is a southeast-facing beach, approximately 360m in length. Neither swimming nor surfing is advised, with hazards including topographical rips, bluebottle and shark sightings. Rock platforms occupy the southern end of the beach, which has been used by many as a fishing spot. Behind the beach exists an extensive system of sand dunes, occupying over 130,000 square meters. While not as big as the Cronulla sand dunes, the area is still comparable to that of Sydney Cove. Lagoons and channels, running off from Marley Lagoon, run through the sand dunes, acting as a popular swimming spot, alternative to the Marley Beach surf. While the landscape and water flow of the dunes change constantly over time, there is usually a consistent body of water about 150 meters from the shore.

== Gallery ==
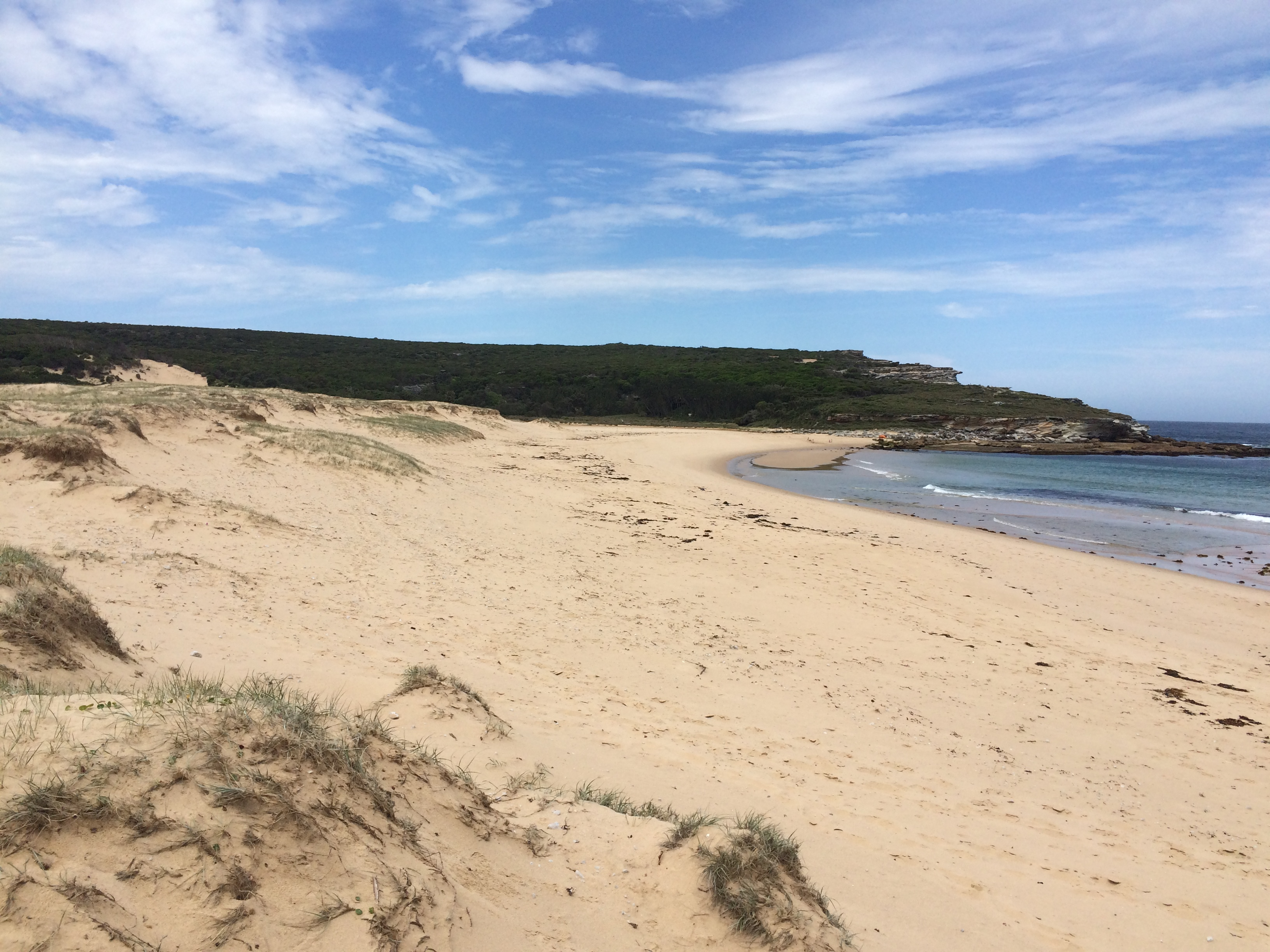
View across Marley Beach from the southernmost part of the beach, looking northwest.

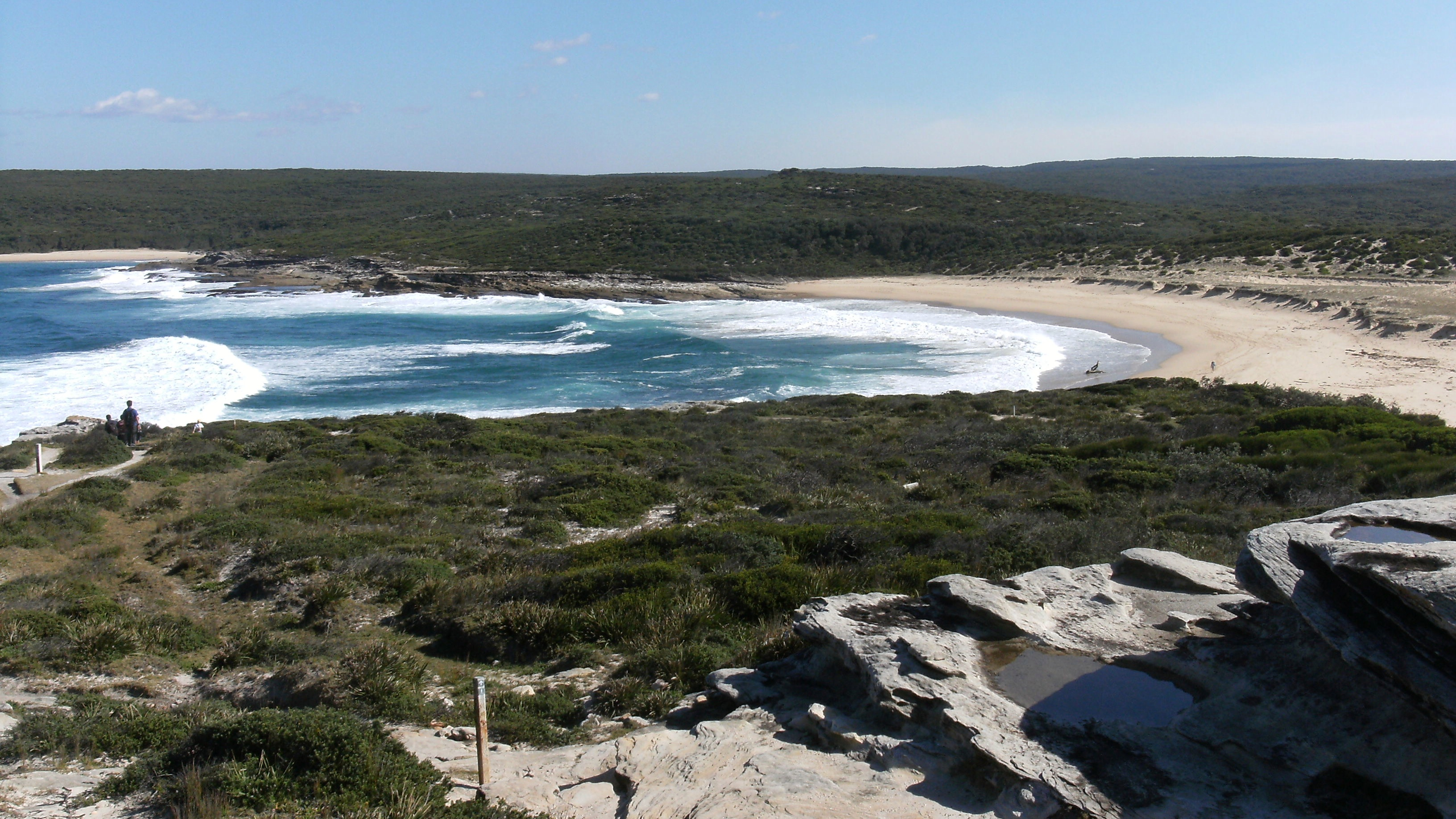
View of Marley and Little Marley Beach from Marley Head, looking southwest.

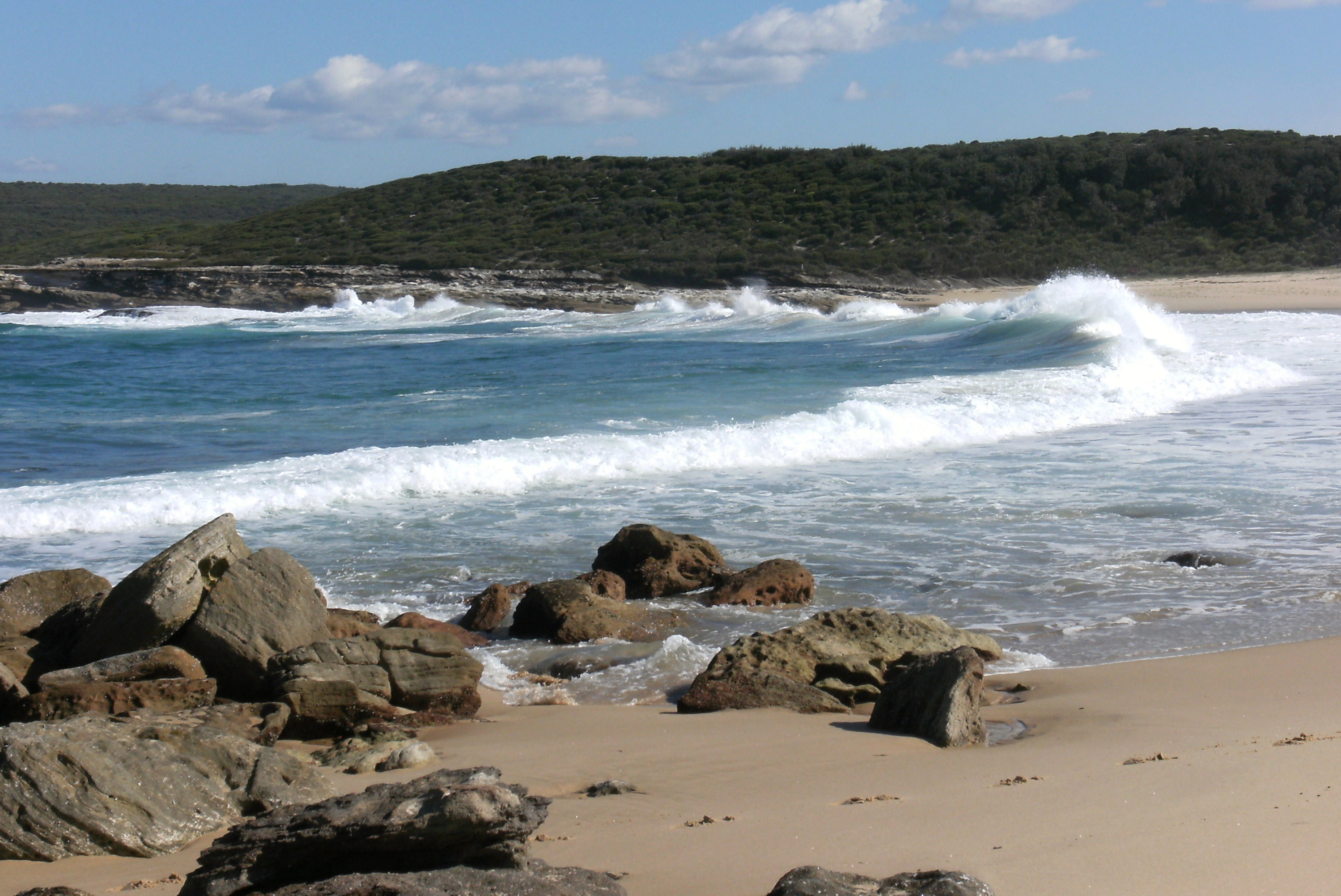
View across Marley Beach, looking southwest.

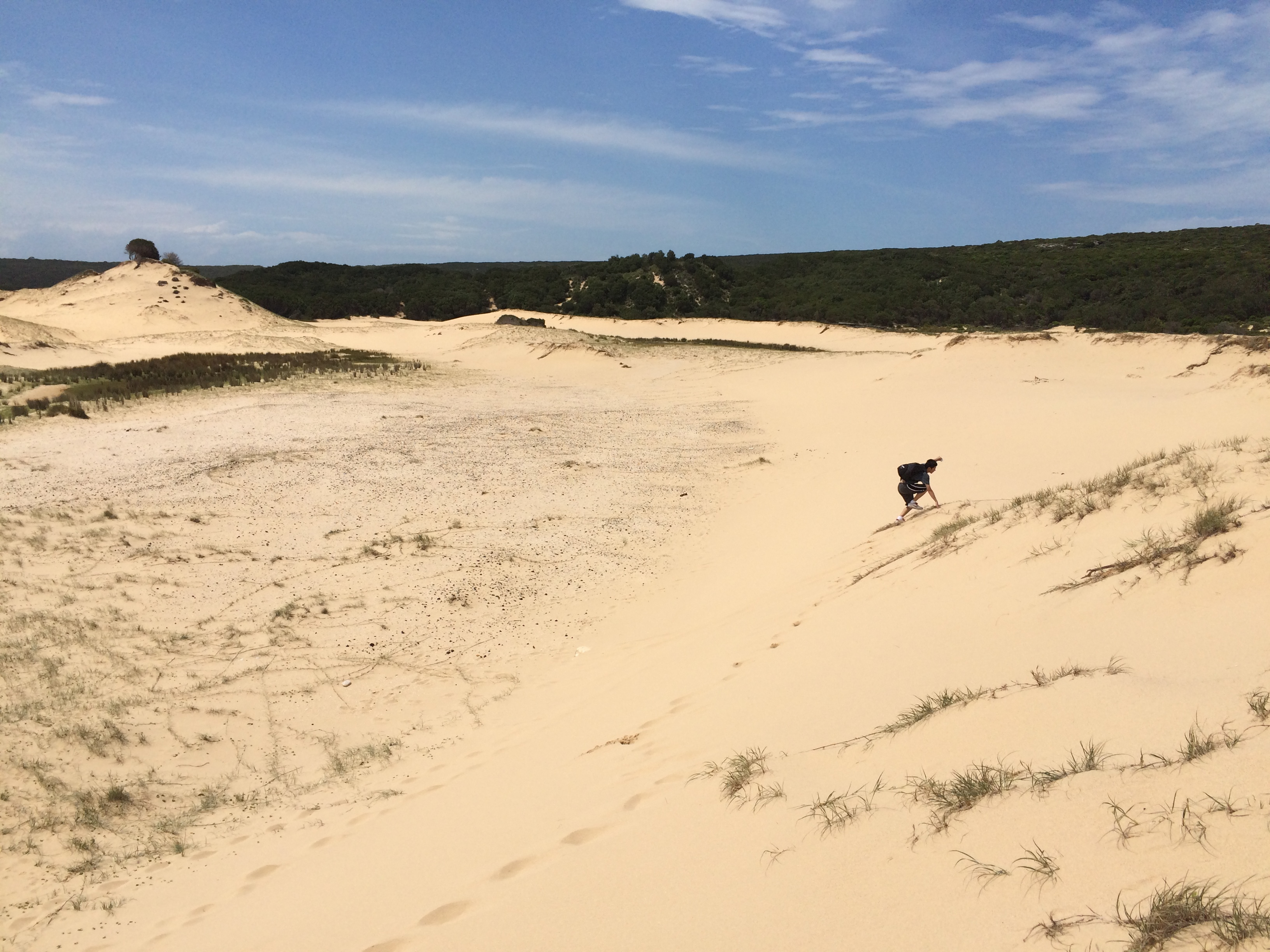
View of the sand dunes behind Marley Beach.

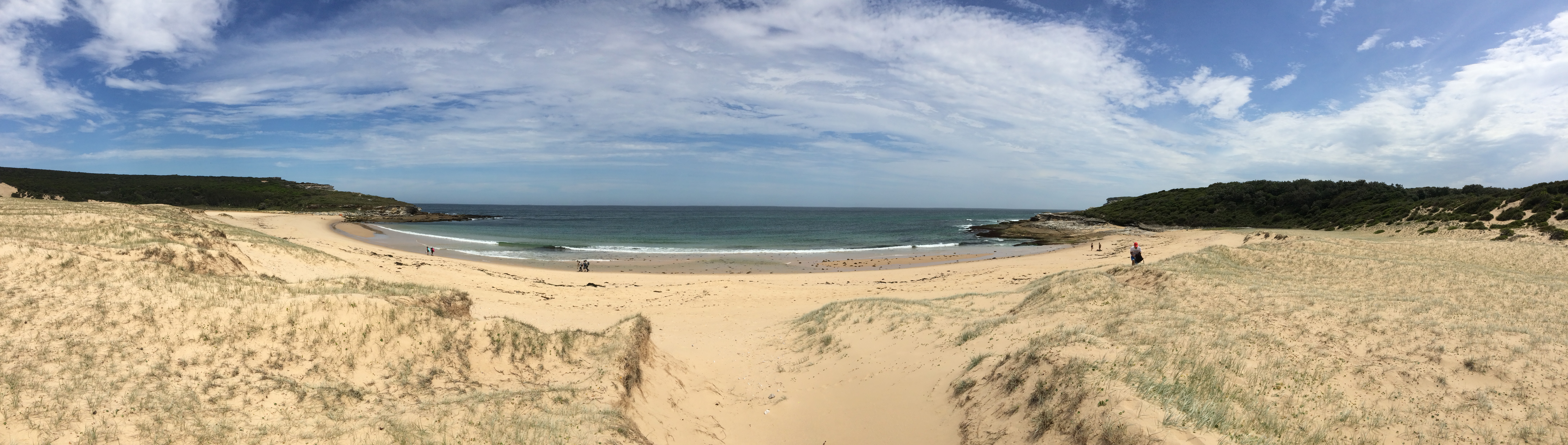
Panoramic image of Marley Beach, taken from the sand dunes, looking towards the Tasman Sea.

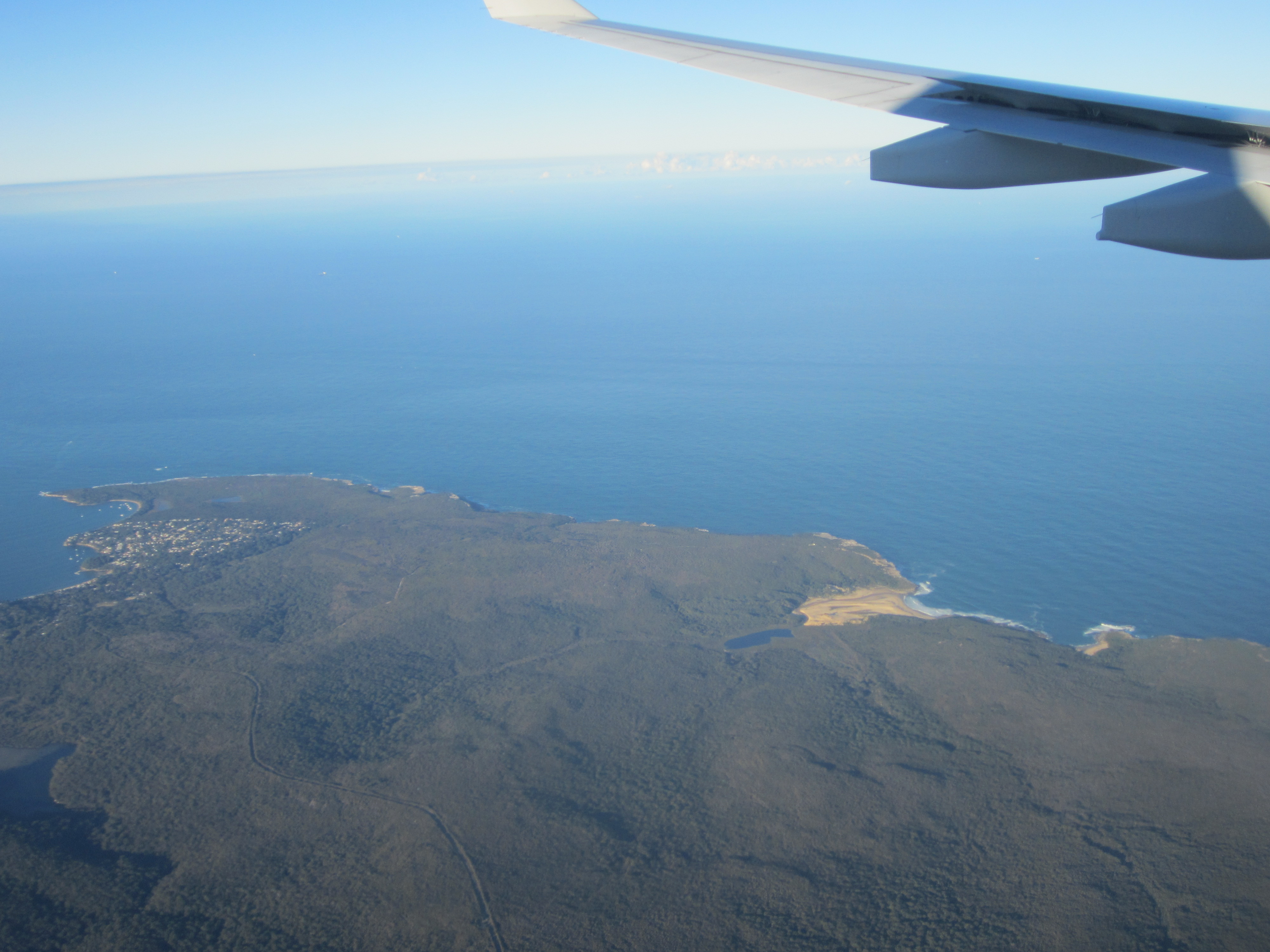
Aerial view of Marley Beach in the Royal National Park and Bundeena
