= Lady Carrington Drive =

Historic service and walking trail in New South Wales, Australia

Coordinates: 34°06′51.5″S 151°02′47.9″E

Lady Carrington Drive New South Wales
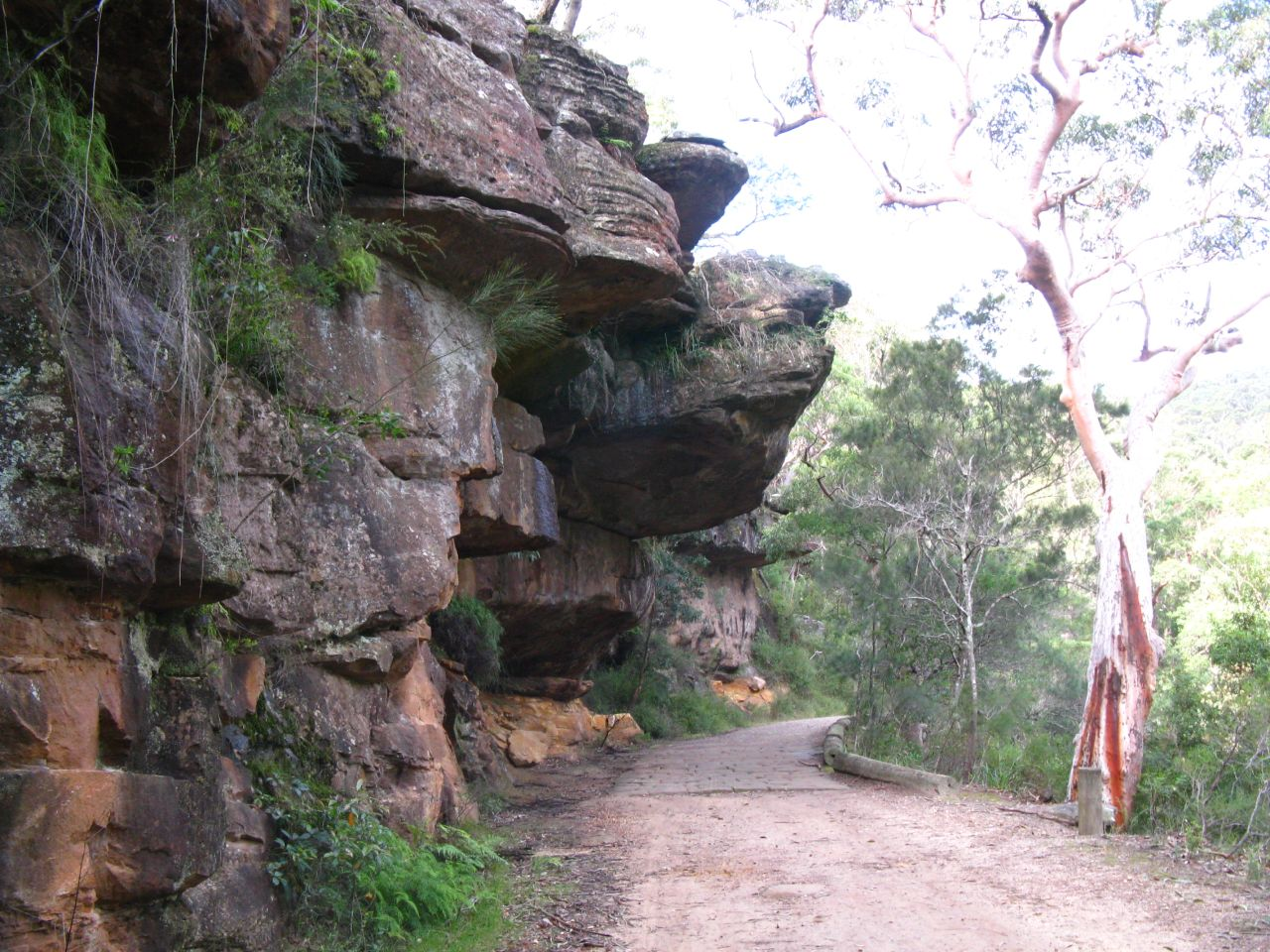
- View of Gibraltar Rock, a rock formation beside Lady Carrington Drive near the trail's start at Audley.

General information
- Type: Track
- Length: 9.7 km (6.0 mi)

Major junctions
- North end: Sir Bertram Stevens Drive, Audley
- South end: Lady Wakehurst Drive, Waterfall

Location(s)
- via: Royal National Park

Lady Carrington Drive is a designated scenic service and walking trail located in the Royal National Park. The trail runs from Audley to the southern precinct of the park east of Waterfall, alongside the Hacking River. Opened in 1886, the 10-kilometre long trail was the first scenic route to be completed in the Royal National Park, seven years after the park was officially declared. It initially served as a carriageway, although traffic on the road is closed, and the trail now serves as a bike and walking trail. The route bypasses many scenic points along the Hacking River, including Gibraltar Rock and Palona Cave.

== History ==
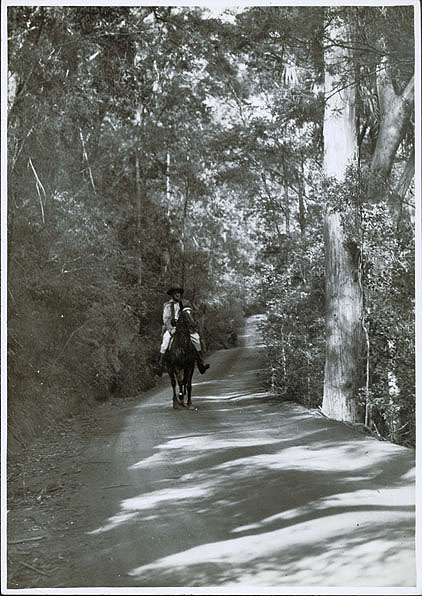
Historic photograph of a park ranger riding on horseback on lady Carrington Drive.

Originally named Lady Carrington Road, the trail took three years to build, starting in 1880 and completed in 1883, although it would not be opened to traffic until another three years later, in 1886. It was the first scenic route to be built through the Royal National Park, which was officially proclaimed by acting Premier of New South Wales John Robertson only the year earlier. The route was first used as a carriageway from Audley through to the southern precinct of the park, east of Waterfall, described as a "pleasure drive, through beautiful sylvan scenery". (Note: "A road from the main camp at Audley to the main Illawarra/Sydney road was constructed between 1880 and 1883 as well as a road running over the Audley causeway and along the right bank of the Hacking River to the southern boundary of the park. This road was opened in 1886 by Lady Carrington and was identified as Lady Carrington Road (later Drive).")

The trail is named after the wife of former Governor of New South Wales, Lord Charles Carrington, Lady Cecilia Carrington. Held in high esteem by the public at the time, the Carringtons were noted for their generosity, and resulting popularity and appeal. Lady Carrington herself was noted for her charitable works, including having established a Jubilee Fund to relieve distressed women. Lady Carrington Drive is one of many places named in honour of the Carringtons, most notable of which are the Carrington Hotel, Katoomba and the Carrington Falls in the Budderoo National Park. Lady Carrington herself opened the road in 1886, a year after her husband was appointed Governor of New South Wales. While the road was cited as the source of the Royal National Park's initial popularity, the road saw waning traffic as the popularity was shifted towards the coastal regions of the park, and was later closed to traffic. The road now serves as a bike and walking track.

== Route ==
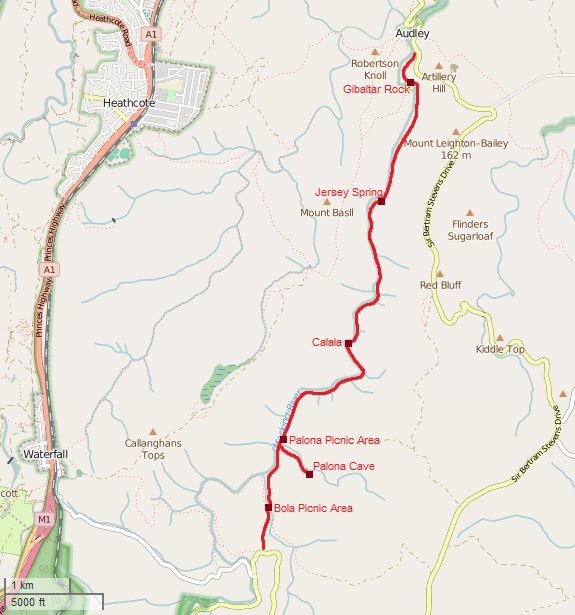
Map of Lady Carrington Drive, highlighted in red, and surrounds. (Click to enlarge)

Lady Carrington Drive starts out at Audley at its north end, where it splits off from Sir Bertram Stevens Drive, just south of Audley Weir. The near entirety of the route is situated on the eastern bank of the Hacking River, the longest river in the Royal National Park. Traffic from Sir Bertram Stevens Drive is allowed up to 200m into the route, with the Royal National Park Visitor Centre situated at the very start of Lady Carrington Drive, and vehicle access into the Willow Tree Flat and Fig Tree Flat picnic grounds. Past Fig Tree Flat, the road is closed off to traffic, and continues as a bike and foot-only track. The trail notably passes over many brooks, which resulted in a large number of small bridges being built for the trail. The brooks are named after the traditional names of birds; the list of brooks from north to south are as follows; Mullion (Eagle), Wurrul (Bee Eater), Burowa (Bustard), Karonga (White Crane), Gorra Worra (Laughing Jackass), Buralga (Native Companion), Kobardo (Parrot), Birumba (Plover), Dirijiri (Wagtail), Murrindum (Quail), Dumbal (Crow), Tamur (Bronze winged Pigeon), Burunda (Swan), Karani (Duck) and Palona (Hawk).

The first section of the trail follows a long series of sandstone faces up until a formation known as Gibraltar Rock, which overhangs an old cobblestone section of the trail. The formation is named after the Rock of Gibraltar. Jersey Spring can be found 2.5 kilometres (1.6 mi) into the trail; the spring feeds into two sandstone watering troughs, built in 1892 to provide water for horses and people traveling along Lady Carrington Road. The troughs, to this day, are still fed by the same spring. The spring is named after Victor Child Villiers, 7th Earl of Jersey, the then-Governor of New South Wales. Immediately after, the first of four rest areas along the trail can be found, named the Jersey Spring Clearing; it is an open grass field. 5.2 kilometres (3.2 mi) into the trail, the Calala rest area can be found, which features a picnic table and a small trail leading to the banks of the Hacking, where minor beaches can be found. Between Calala and the Palona Brook Picnic Area, found 7.7 kilometres (4.8 mi) into the trail, a plaque dedicated to the memory of Alan Rendell, who died fighting bushfires in 1988, can be found.

A kilometre-long offshoot of the track from the Palona Brook Picnic Area leads to the Palona Cave, a large limestone overhang featuring columns, stalactites and even green moss; not reminiscent of most other pristine white limestone caves. 8.7 kilometres (5.4 mi) in, the last of the four rest points, the Bola Picnic Area, can be found at the intersection of Lady Carrington Drive and the Forest Track, which is a short, circuit track that runs through a dense rainforest section of the park. The trail ends at 9.7 kilometres (6.0 mi), where the trail connects to Lady Wakehurst Drive.
