= Royal National Park =

Protected area in Australia

Coordinates: 34°07′06″S 151°03′50″E

- IUCN category II (national park)
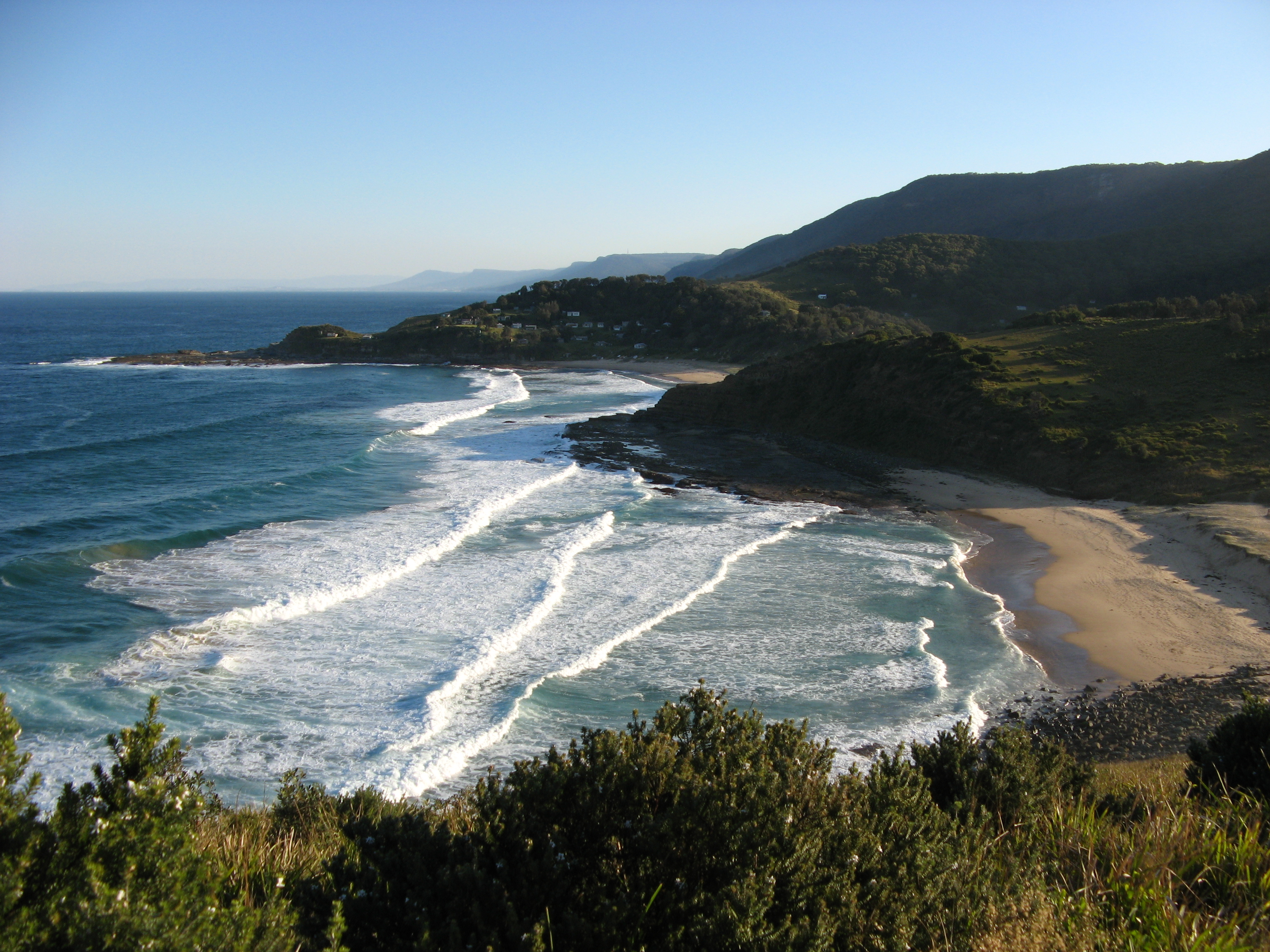
- A view of the Era beaches on the Royal National Park Coast Track, looking south from Thelma Head (Note: This view of the southern region of the Royal National Park coastline, pictured in May 2009, depicts North Era Beach (foreground) and South Era Beach (behind North Era), with Semi-Detached Point visible as the thin stretch of land visible at the left of South Era in this image. A chain of mountains that form part of the Illawarra Escarpment can be visible in the distance behind Semi-Detached Point. Mount Mitchell is the most distant discernible feature in this image.)

- Location within New South Wales
- Location: New South Wales
- Nearest city: Sydney and Wollongong
- Area: 150.91 km^{2} (58.27 sq mi)
- Established: 26 April 1879
- Governing body: NSW National Parks & Wildlife Service
- Website: Official website

The Royal National Park is a protected national park in the Sutherland Shire local government area in Southern Sydney and in the City of Wollongong local government area in the Illawarra region of New South Wales, Australia.

The 151-square-kilometre (58 sq mi) national park is about 29 kilometres (18 mi) south of the Sydney central business district near the localities of Loftus, Otford and Waterfall.

It was founded by Sir John Robertson, Acting Premier of New South Wales, and formally proclaimed on 26 April 1879, a mere 7 years after Yellowstone National Park (1872) and 11 years before Yosemite National Park in the United States. Although Yosemite had been federally protected land since 1864, it did not become a 'National Park' until 1890. It was the first national park to be declared in Australia. Its original name was just National Park, but it was renamed in 1955 after Elizabeth II, Queen of Australia passed by in the train during her 1954 tour.

The park was added to the Australian National Heritage List in December 2006.

== Features ==
The park is situated in traditional lands of the Dharawal, an Aboriginal Australian people. The park includes today's settlements of Audley, Maianbar and Bundeena.

Audley can be accessed by road from Loftus, Waterfall or Otford, and there are several railway stations (Loftus, Engadine, Heathcote, Waterfall, Helensburgh and Otford) on the outskirts of the park. Bundeena and Maianbar can also be accessed by road through the park or by the passenger ferry service from Cronulla.

The national park once had its own dedicated railway station, part of a branch off the Illawarra Line. The branch closed in 1991, and has since been converted to a heritage tramway operated by the Sydney Tramway Museum.

There are numerous cycling and walking trails, barbecue areas and picnic sites throughout the park. Over 100 kilometres (62 mi) of walking tracks take in a wide range of scenery. Cycling is allowed on some fire trails and only on specially marked tracks within the Park. The specially marked mountain biking tracks are bi-directional; care should be taken when traversing these trails. A fee of $12.00 applies when taking a car into the Park.

The most popular walk is the Coast Walk, which skirts the park's eastern edge and delivers exceptional coastal scenery. It is a 30 kilometre track, involving walking from Bundeena to Otford, or vice versa. It's recommended that walkers allow 2 days for the walk. This walk is often done as part of The Duke of Edinburgh's Award. The Wallumarra Track (Wallumarra is an Aboriginal word for education/protect) was constructed in 1975 to meet the growing need for Environmental Education and as a supplement to the park's walking track system. The park is intensely used for environmental education by schools, TAFEs, universities and other groups.

The park has been burnt in bushfires on several occasions, most notably in 1939, 1994 and in the 2001 Black Christmas fires. Australian native bush naturally regenerates after bushfires and as of 2008 few signs of these fires remain visible. In times of extreme fire danger the parks service might close the park to ensure visitor safety.

There are camping sites at Bonnie Vale, North Era and Uloola Falls. These are the only places where camping is permitted within the park, and they are regulated with a booking/registration system, which requires pre-booking a site. The park charges a vehicle access fee, but is free for people on foot.

== Geography, flora and fauna ==
Royal National Park contains a wide variety of terrain. Roughly, landscapes in the park vary from coastal cliffs broken by beaches and small inlets to an ancient high plateau broken by extensive and deep river valleys. The river valleys drain from south to north where they run into Port Hacking, the extensive but generally shallow harbor inlet which forms the northern border of the park. When looking across the park from east to west (or vice versa) the rugged folds of valley after valley fade into the distance.

The geology of the site consists mostly of the Triassic Hawkesbury Sandstone with some sections of the park having the more recent richer Wianamatta shale capping. Deep below the Hawkesbury sandstone belt lies Narrabeen Shales which is mixture of shale and sandstone under which and within which are untapped coal seams which run right through Sydney and are mined extensively where they come closer to the surface south of the National Park near Wollongong. Sections of recent alluvium fringes of estuarine watercourse where the endangered ecological communities; swamp oak woodlands and swamp mahogany woodlands grow still.

=== Coastal heathland ===
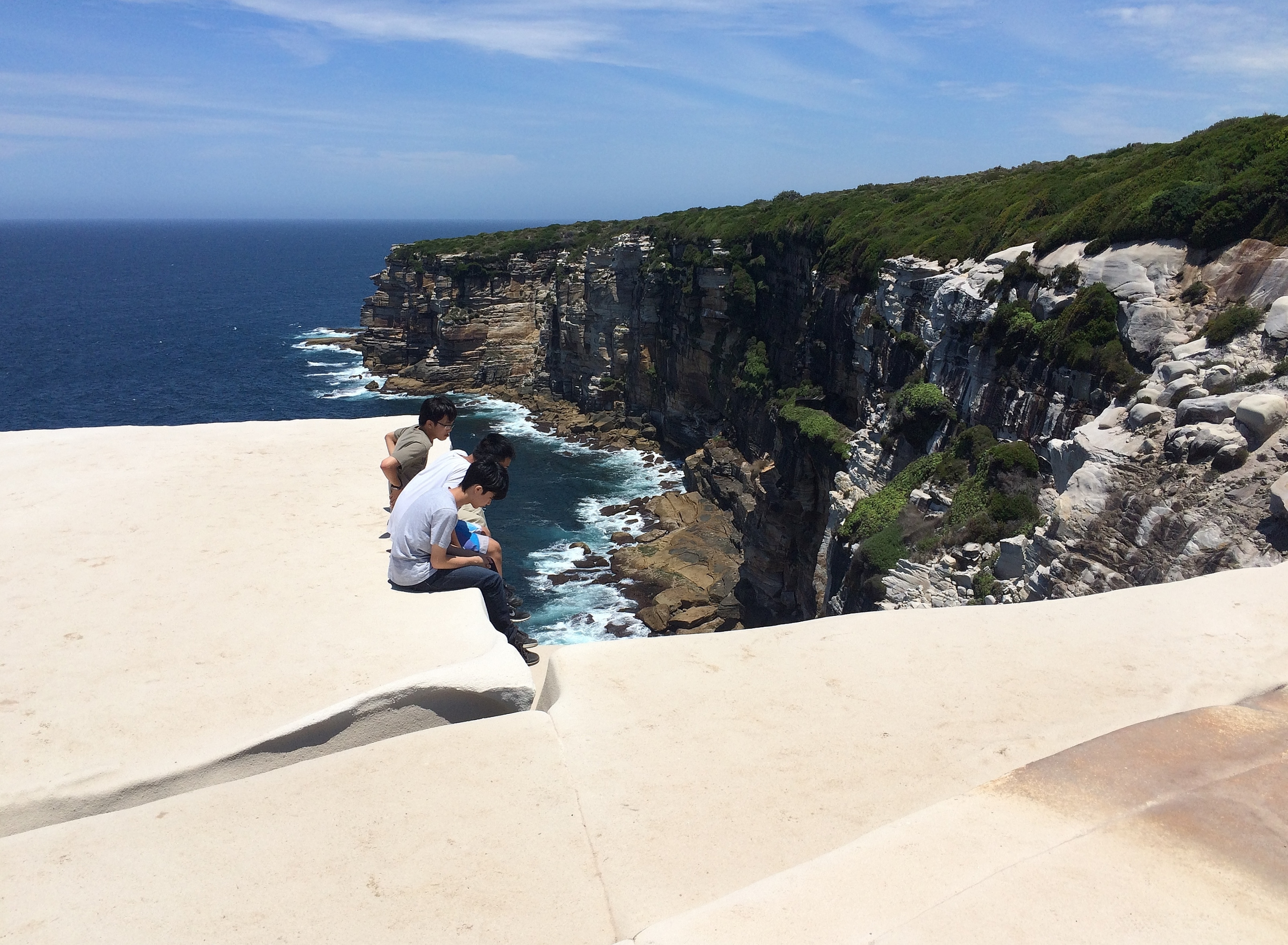
The majority of the park's coastline is dominated by tall cliffs, forming unique features such as Wedding Cake Rock (pictured), facading vast heathland.

Running the full coastal length of the park is a coastal heathland characterised by hardy, low-growing, salt-tolerant shrubs that spread across rocky, hard terrain with very little topsoil. The coast itself is composed mostly of high cliffs reaching a height of nearly one hundred metres at the southern end. These cliffs are punctuated by a number of fine, sandy beaches open to the ocean and providing fine swimming and surfing. Several of the beaches can be reached by road, others only by several hours of bush walking. There are a small number of rocky coves. The beaches, two of which have volunteer surf life-saving clubs and large car parks, are amongst the most visited areas of the park. These heath lands are a hotspot for many small birds that have forsaken the suburbs of Sydney such as the New Holland honeyeater.

Common vegetation on the exposed heaths on the headlands and cliffside paths include Coastal rosemary, darwinia, bracelet honey-myrtle, she-oak, white kunzea, sundew, grass trees, ridged heath-myrtle, snakehood orchids, prostrate forms of coast banksia and long-leaf matrush.

Common vegetation on top of the ancient sand dunes above the coastal path includes silver banksia (Banksia marginata), scrub-oak (Allocasuarina distyla), silky hakea (Hakea sericea), and pine heath (Astroloma pinifolium).

Sections of rare and threatened clifftop grasslands occur along exposed and windy sites which are generally dominated by long-leaf mat-rush and kangaroo grass (Themeda australis).

Many heath specialist birds are present in the heaths which include Lewin's honeyeater (Meliphaga lewinii), New Holland honeyeater (Phylidonyris novaehollandiae), beautiful firetail (Stagonopleura bella), chestnut-rumped heathwren (Hylacola pyrrhopygia) and the southern emu-wren.

=== Littoral rainforest ===
In Royal National Park, littoral rainforest (often the first type of vegetation destroyed during coastal development) has survived the ravages that occurred elsewhere during the 19th and 20th centuries. An example of this vegetation occurs in the southern stretch of the Coast Walk, often referred to as the "Palm Jungle", and includes a typical tuckeroo (Cupaniopsis anacardioides) forest, under grown by coastal tea tree (Leptospermum laevigatum) and long-Leaf matrush (Lomandra longifolia).

=== Exposed uplands ===
Moving farther inland the terrain rises to a series of very rocky ridges and plateaus characterized by hardy, low-growing shrubs and very poor, rocky soil. These ridges are the remnants of an ancient, much larger plateau that has been deeply eroded into an extensive series of river valleys. This specific ridge land habitat is particularly significant for Sydney as most similar habitat was left unprotected and was subsequently destroyed to make way for cheap development which has made many species only found ridges threatened with extinction due to extreme habitat clearance/fragmentation. Soils on plateau land are often up to 2m deep and consist of on sandstone ridges: sandy podsol interspersed with pockets of clay derived. Clay Ridges and Plateaus also have deep Soils but are far rarer due to lack of representation in the park on these sites the soil is derived from Wianamatta clay and is considered rich land producing good quality forest.

=== Valley sides ===
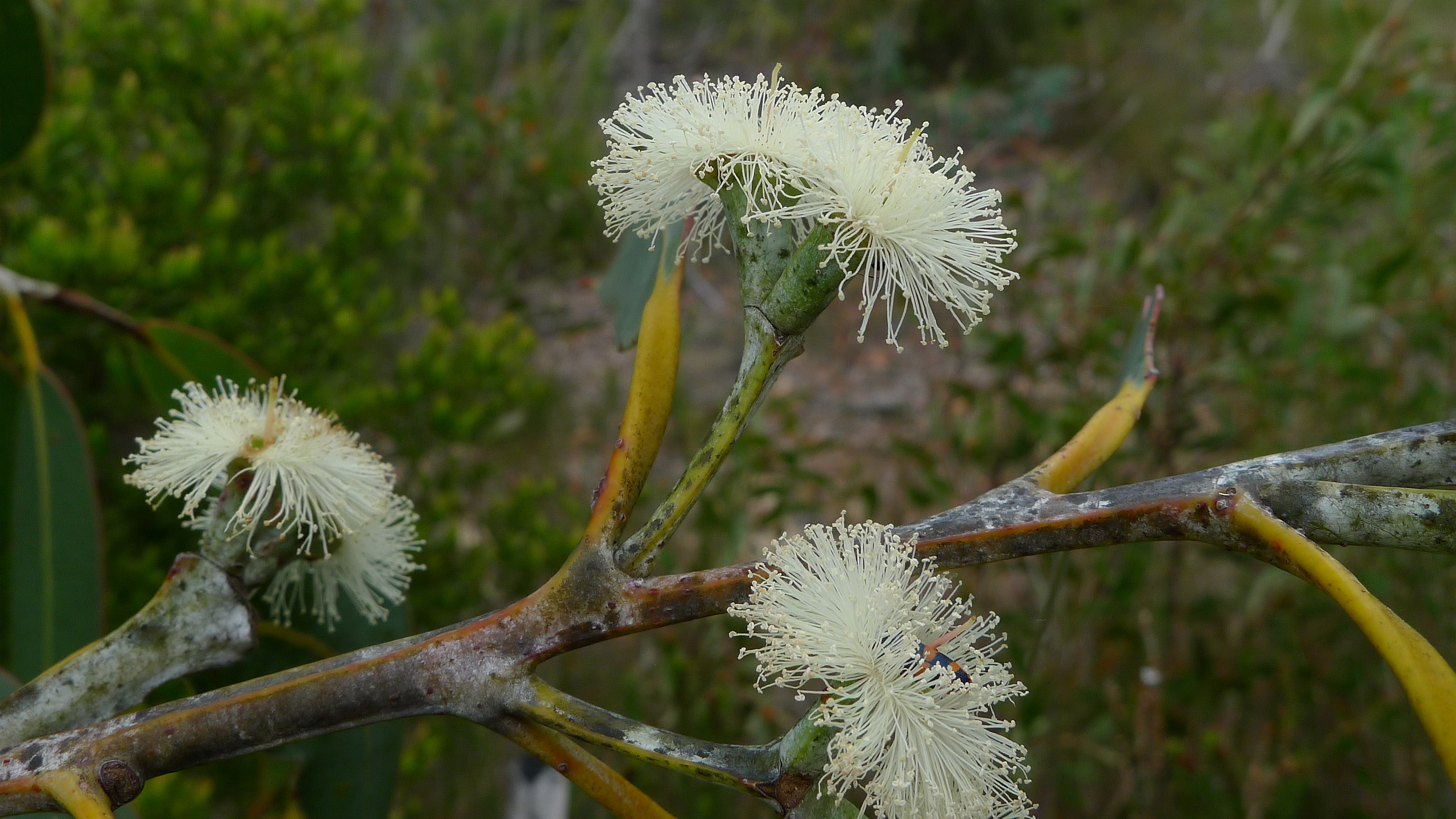
Many species of Eucalyptus, such as the Eucalyptus luehmanniana, thrive in the Royal National Park.

On the sides of the steep river valleys that punctuate the uplands the terrain changes to exposed rock with collected pockets of soil. Although still fairly rocky, a large number of eucalyptus and other tree species are prevalent. Small streams are to be found reasonably frequently and understory plants cohabitate with the larger trees, although the terrain is still fairly open and easy to move through. Tree heights in this area reach an average maximum of about ten metres. The plant mix and geography conditions in this area are typical of much of the terrain in the coastal areas of New South Wales but with many widespread genera having highly localized species in the Royal National Park. This sort of habitat is one of the most floristically diverse in Sydney Basin.

This environment is classed as sclerophyll open forest and is divided into "dry" and "wet" sclerophyll forest. Factors that shape this habitat are primarily bushfires, low phosphorus/nitrogen levels, intense summer heat and low water levels. Resulting in a diverse floristic assembly of flora and fauna with apparently divergent paths in similar habitats, for example scribbly gums (Eucalyptus racemosa/sclerophylla/haemastoma) have smooth barked trees in a manner which reduces their chance of catching on fire while stringy barks (Eucalyptus sp.) have bark which easily catches alight clearing the way for its fire-stimulated seedlings.

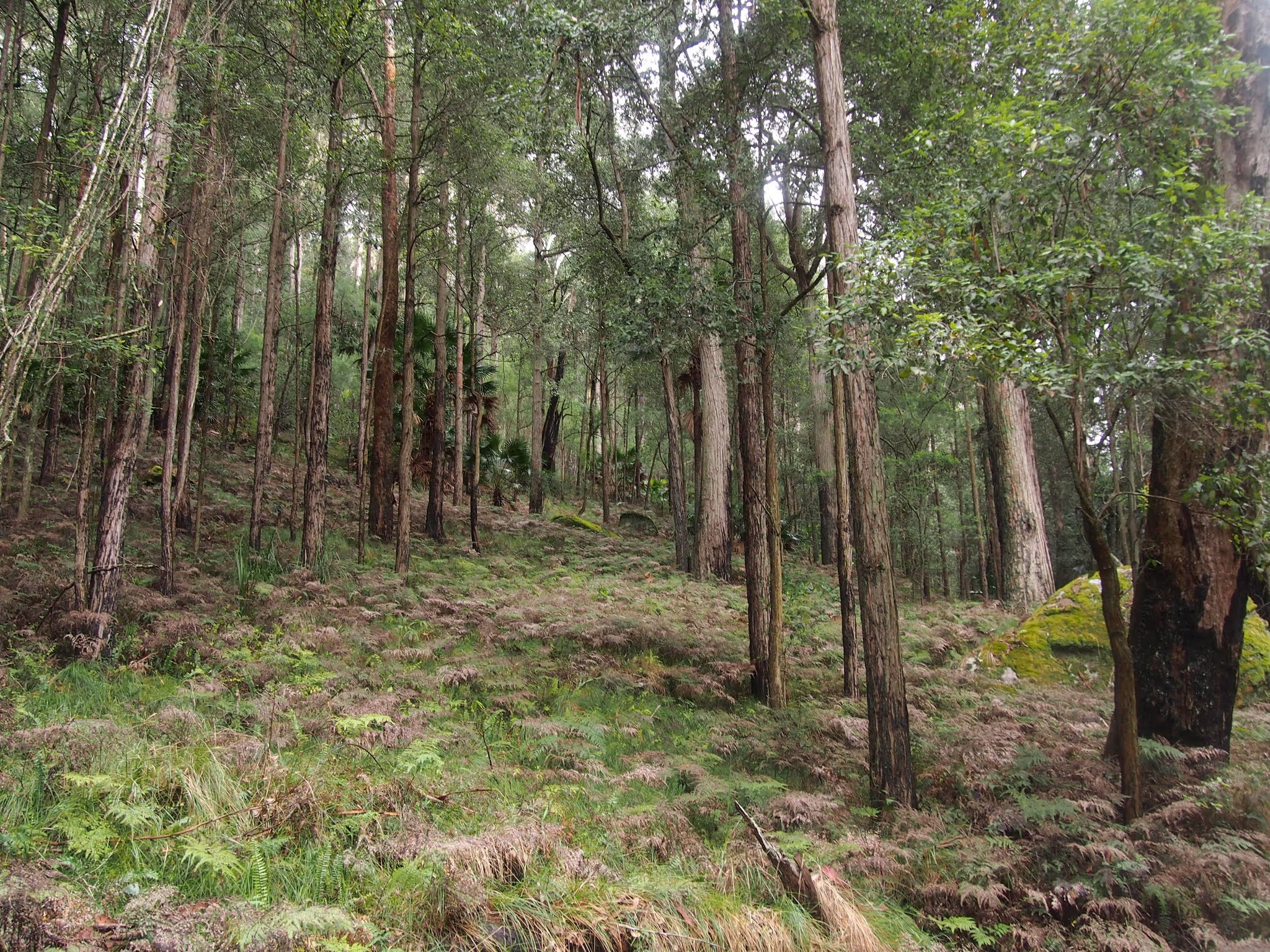
The "Forest Island", a section of forest in the park's south mostly flanked by the Hacking River. In raised valley floors such as these, many more species of flora thrive than in other environments of the park.

Commonly encountered vegetation in this environments include but are not limited to; Sydney redgums (Angophora costata), Sydney peppermints (Eucalyptus piperita), Port Jackson pine (Callitris rhomboidea), red bloodwoods (Corymbia gummifera), Pomaderris sp., old man banksia (Banksia serrata), hairpin banksia (Banksia spinulosa), rock banksia (Banksia oblongifolia), Sydney boronia (Boronia ledifolia), native sarsaparilla (Smilax glyciphylla), violet twining pea (Hardenbergia violacea), dusky coral pea (Kennedia rubicunda), the traditional narcotic hop bush (Dodonaea triquetra), native pea (Dillwynia sieberi), sometimes dwarf apple (Angophora hispida), parasitic devils twine (Cassytha sp.), native panic (Entolasia stricta), Lepidosperma sp. grass, forest grass trees (Xanthorrhoea arborea), Sydney waratah (Telopea speciosissima), flannel flowers (Actinotus minor as well as Actinotus helianthi), blueberry ash (Elaeocarpus reticulatus), silky hakea (Hakea sericea), variable bossiaea (Bossiaea heterophylla), bonnet orchids (Cryptostylis erecta), hyacinth orchids (Dipodium variegatum/punctatum/roseum), Pomax umbellata, native parsley (Lomatia silaifolia), edible native currants (Leptomeria acida), broad leaved geebungs (Persoonia levis), Sydney golden wattles (Acacia longifolia), gymea lilies (Doryanthes excelsa), various sheo-oaks (Allocasuarina littoralis/distyla/verticillata etc.), flax leafed wattle (Acacia linifolia), bracken (Pteridium esculentum), grey spider flower (Grevillea buxifolia/sphacelata), red spider flower (Grevillea oleoides), pink spider flower (Grevillea sericea) and native iris (Patersonia sericea/glabrata/longifolia) to literally name a few of the hundreds of beautiful flora encountered in this diverse and widespread habitat. Even certain hybrid species may be encountered such as the common Banksia ericifolia x spinulosus or the rarer Angophora costata x hispida.

Birds that frequent this habitat include Golden whistlers (Pachycephala pectoralis), yellow-tailed black cockatoos (Calyptorhynchus funereus), laughing kookaburra (Dacelo novaeguineae), eastern whipbirds (Psophodes olivaceus), New Holland honeyeaters (Phylidonyris novaehollandiae), eastern spinebill (Acanthorhynchus tenuirostris), rufous whistlers (Pachycephala rufiventris), willie wagtails (Rhipidura leucophrys), superb fairywrens (Malurus cyaneus), crimson rosellas/mountain lowry (Platycercus elegans), yellow-rumped thornbills (Acanthiza chrysorrhoa) and white-browed scrubwrens (Sericornis frontalis).

Other commonly encountered animals in this habitat include native honeybees, wallaroos (Macropus robustus), common echidnas (Tachyglossus aculeatus) as well as other far rarer species such as the koala (Phascolarctos cinereus), the dingo (Canis lupus dingo) or the predatory native marsupial the spotted quoll (Dasyurus maculatus spp. maculatus).

=== Valley floors ===
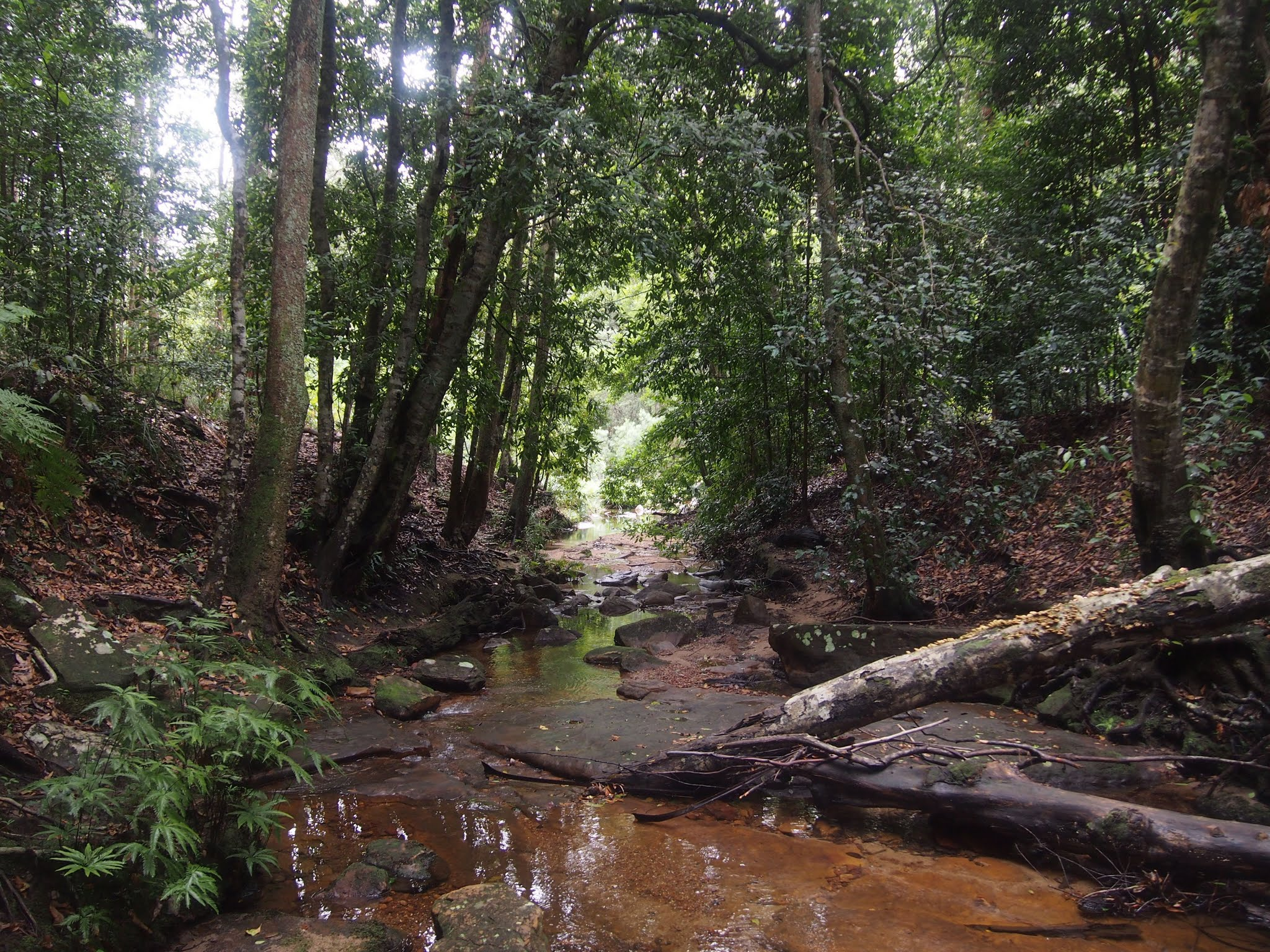
Couranga Track view of Waterfall Creek, one of many that run throughout the park

With rich soils and good supply of water the valley floors are cooler and more humid than any other part of the park. Large tree species such as Australian cedar (Toona cilliata prev. T. australis) and the larger eucalypt species dominate. Tree height reach 50 metres or more and a rich understory of fern, wattles, and other medium-size plants proliferate. Some small areas are classified as temperate rainforest. These areas are characterized by dense groves of very large trees including the iconic Port Jackson fig (Ficus rubiginosa) and Moreton Bay fig (Ficus macrophylla) trees. The absence of light leads to a lack of undergrowth other than a profusion of ferns. These are among the more popular areas for visitors to the park. The park service is also very careful to protect these areas due to their general rarity in the hot, arid Australian landscape.

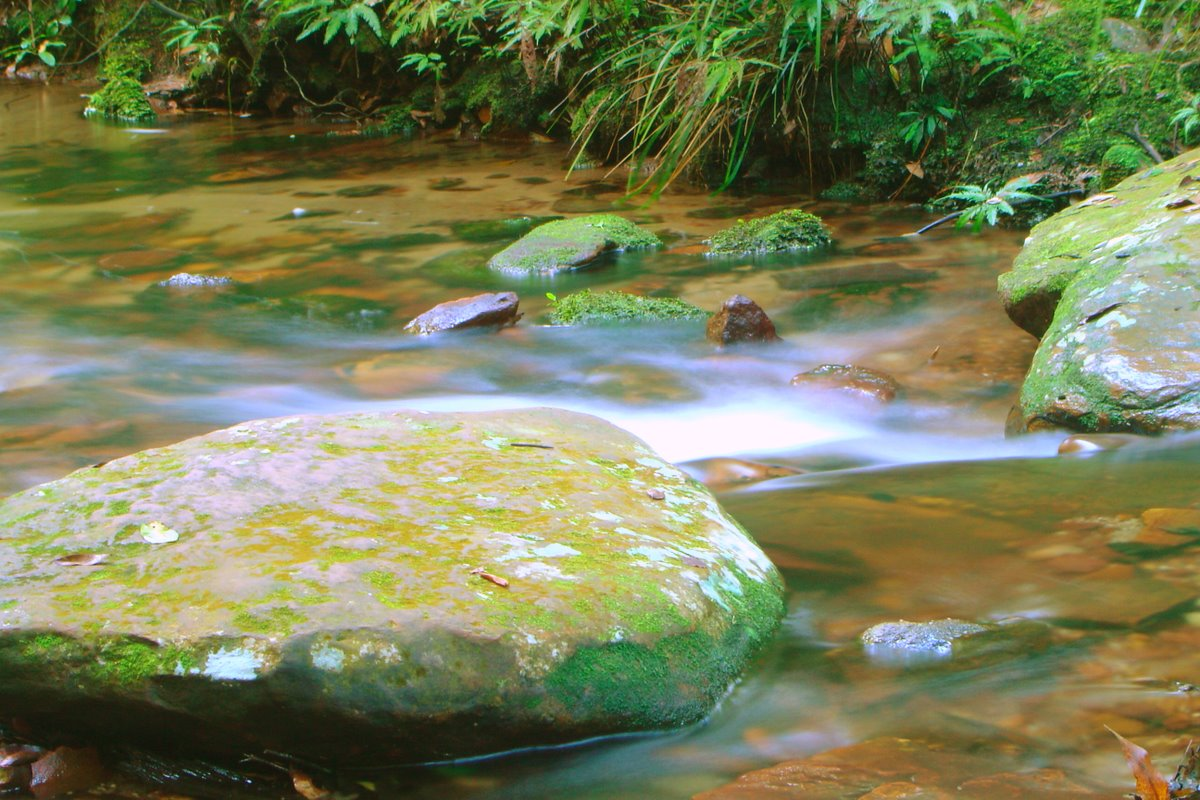
A tributary of the Hacking River, beside Lady Carrington Drive

Impressive groves of turpentine (Syncarpia glomulifera) and blackbutt (Eucalyptus pilularis) trees may be seen growing straight up into the sky forming an open canopy with widely spaced trunks. In these characteristic areas they are generally considered open forest, they may have a grassy understory, a sclerophyll shrubbery or alternatively they may have a rainforest subcanopy or a rainforest understory with growth being densest nearest to the valley floor or permanent watercourses. In these turpentine forests often hundreds of cabbage palms (Livistona australis) may be seen growing in dense tall thickets which are rarely touched by fire or they may exist as young plants in open grassy spaces which are burnt regularly enough not to form visible trunks. Rainforest pockets are dominated by jackwood and sassafras. The lilli pilli (Acmena smithii) produces a fruit edible raw. Another common species is the coachwood (Ceratopetalum apetalum) which were used extensively from Australian rainforests to manufacture horse-drawn coaches.

Birds distinctive to these rich rainforest habitats include Topknot pigeons (Lopholaimus antarcticus), green catbirds (Ailuroedus crassirostris), rufous fantails (Rhipidura rufifrons) and black-faced monarchs (Monarcha melanopsis). Two interesting birds often encountered in dense scrub or rainforest include the flightless brush turkey (Alectura lathami) and the noise mimicking superb lyrebird (Menura novaehollandiae).

Platypus once found habitat in the Hacking River. In May 2023, the species was returned to the national park under a relocation program jointly conducted by the University of New South Wales, NSW National Parks and Wildlife Service and the World Wildlife Fund. The platypus have been fitted with transmitters, so monitoring in their new environment can continue.

=== Riparian forest ===
In a zone generally up to 10-25m away from running water grows a distinct vegetation community often containing many rare or threatened species only found along several streams in the world. Common vegetation growing in this zone include blackbutt (Eucalyptus pilularis), Sydney red gum (Angophora costata), water gums (Tristaniopsis laurina), bottlebrush (Melaleuca sp.), tea trees (Leptospermum sp.), woolsia (Woollsia pungens), Epacris sp., heath banksia (Banksia ericifolia), Pittosporum undulatum, pine leafed geebungs (Persoonia pinifolia), willow leaved hakea (Hakea salicifolia), Lomandra fluviatilis, bulrushes (Typha orientalis / dominigensis), rushes (Juncus sp.), reeds (Phragmites australis) and tree ferns (Cyathea and Dicksonia sp..)

A variety of different molluscs, crustaceans, insects, fish and birds call the riparian zone their home with a variety of life living near on in the creeks of the Royal National Park. Long-finned eels (Anguilla reinhardtii) which migrate from oceanic spawning grounds as babies and adults mature in the creeks and streams of the Royal National Park and can often be seen in the murky depths of pools and ponds along freshwater courses such as the Hacking River.

=== Mangroves and salt marsh ===
Mudflats exist along the shoreline of the Royal National Park which is substantial enough to sustain a simplistic system of mangrove woodlands especially along the Port Hacking Estuary with the occasional clump of stunted tree on the seaward coastline in sheltered coves. Vegetation in the mangroves consists almost exclusively of the grey mangrove (Avicennia marina var. australasica) growing up to 4m as well as the river mangrove (Aegiceras corniculatum) which is usually only found on the shoreward edge of mangrove woods or in the brackish end of the Port Hacking Estuary.

These mangroves are important nursery grounds for nearly all major angling fish including yellowfin bream (Acanthopagrus australis), flat-tail sea-mullet (Liza argentea), luderick (Girella tricuspidata) and sand whiting (Sillago ciliata) which are caught in adjoining waters as adults, mangroves also provide rich organic matter to the Port Hacking Estuary by fixing carbon into the river system through the addition of leaves into the thick rich black mud. Many crustacean and mollusc species rely on mangroves as a source of food whether by providing foraging through leaf litter, mud or direct predation of the mangrove trees and seeds. Soldier crabs (Mictyris longicarpus), semaphore crab (Heloecius cordiformis), blue swimmer crabs (Portunus pelagicus) and hermit crabs (Pagurus sinuatus) also call the mangroves home. A more casual visitor to the mangroves at high tide is the eastern sea garfish (Hyporhamphus australis) which scoots around just an inch from the surface and is virtually invisible unless viewed through a snorkel.

Dozens of different bird species may be seen foraging in the rich mudflats in and around mangrove flats many of these birds being threatened with extinction and protected by international agreements. Commonly seen bird species include Eastern curlews (Numenius madagascariensis), striated herons (Butorides striatus), brown honeyeaters (Lichmera indistincta), little egrets (Egretta garzetta), royal spoonbills (Platalea regia), white-faced grey herons (Egretta novaehollandiae), Australasian little bitterns (Ixobrychus dubius), pied oystercatchers (Haematopus longirostris), Australasian pelican (Pelecanus conspicillatus), sacred ibis (Threskiornis moluccus), chestnut teal (Anas castanea) and azure kingfishers (Alcedo azurea).

=== Tidal rockshelves and rock pools ===
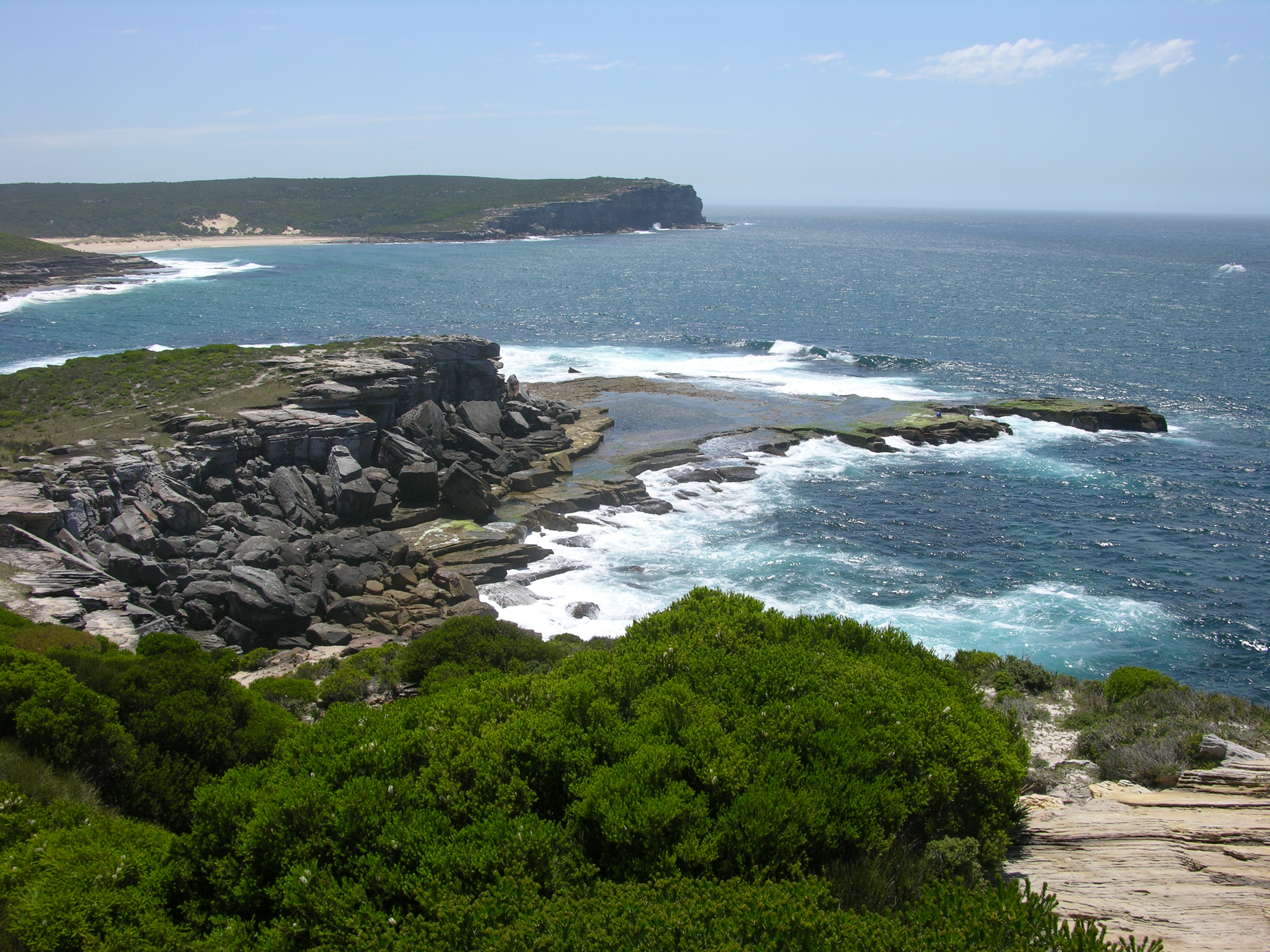
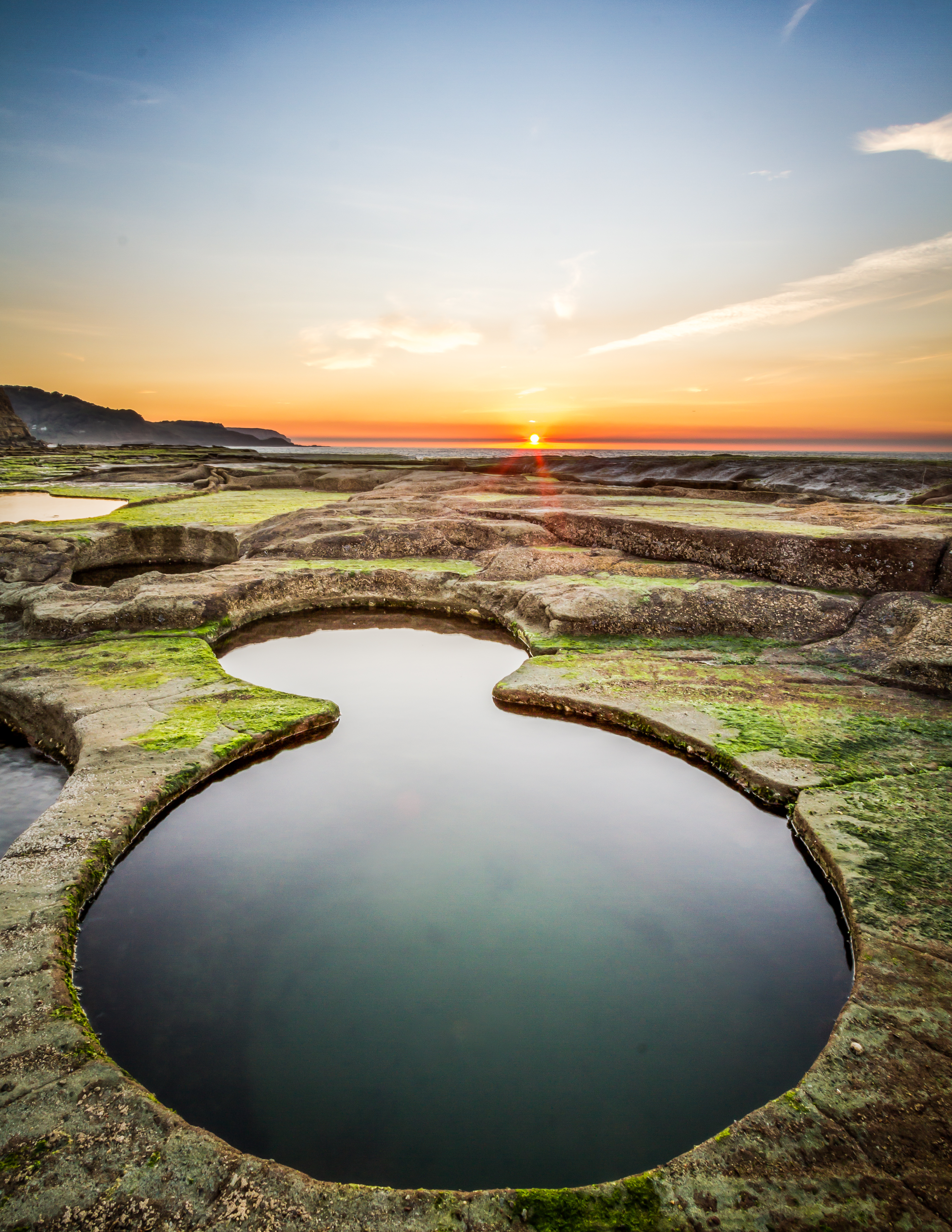
Rockshelves, such as those found south of the Marley beaches (left) and the famous Figure Eight Pools (right) populate the central to southern coast of the park.

A series of sandstone rockshelves and rock pools fringe the entire coastline and Port Hacking Estuary Line of the National Park broken on by small sandy beaches and gentle freshwater inlets. Some of the most commonly encountered molluscs in this habitat include black nerites (Nerita atramentosa), turban snails (Turbo undulata), zebra snails (Austrocochlea porcata) as well as the commercially farmed Sydney rock oyster (Saccostrea glomerata). One of the most common and distinctive seaweed species that grow among the rock pools and the nearshore rockshelves is Neptunes necklace (Hormosira banksii) a seaweed made of small buoyant fleshy bead-like structures which resemble strongly that of a necklace. Beds of the primitive sea-squirt cunjevoi (Pyura stolonifera) are common along coastal rockshelves which are covered by high tide and near sea spray. Considered the most beautiful and obvious of the Royal National Parks' sea anemone is the waratah anemone (Actinia tenebrosa) named after the waratah flower due to its corresponding flame red coloration. A common sea-star found growing in the rock pools is the biscuit sea star (Tosia australis).

The fatally toxic blue-lined octopus (Hapalochlaena fasciata), the most common of the blue-ringed octopus species in the area, can, when touched, prove to be fatal within minutes. They are nearly impossible to spot unless pointed out, and can be found in small or large rock pools. The best way to avoid stings completely is to not allow any part of one's body to enter any rock pool.

== Park highlights ==
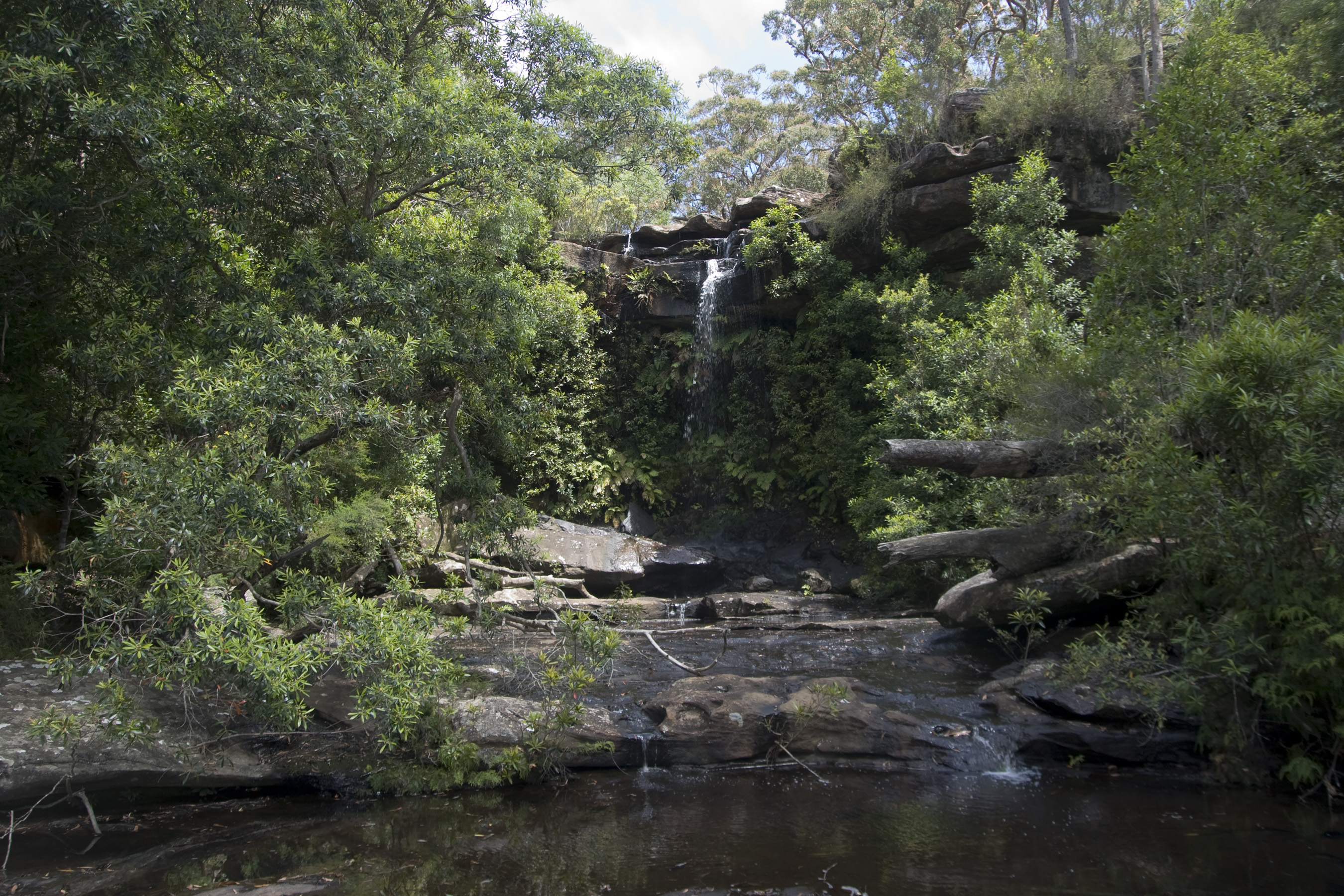
The National Falls, the namesake of the nearby suburb of Waterfall, as it appeared in December 2010

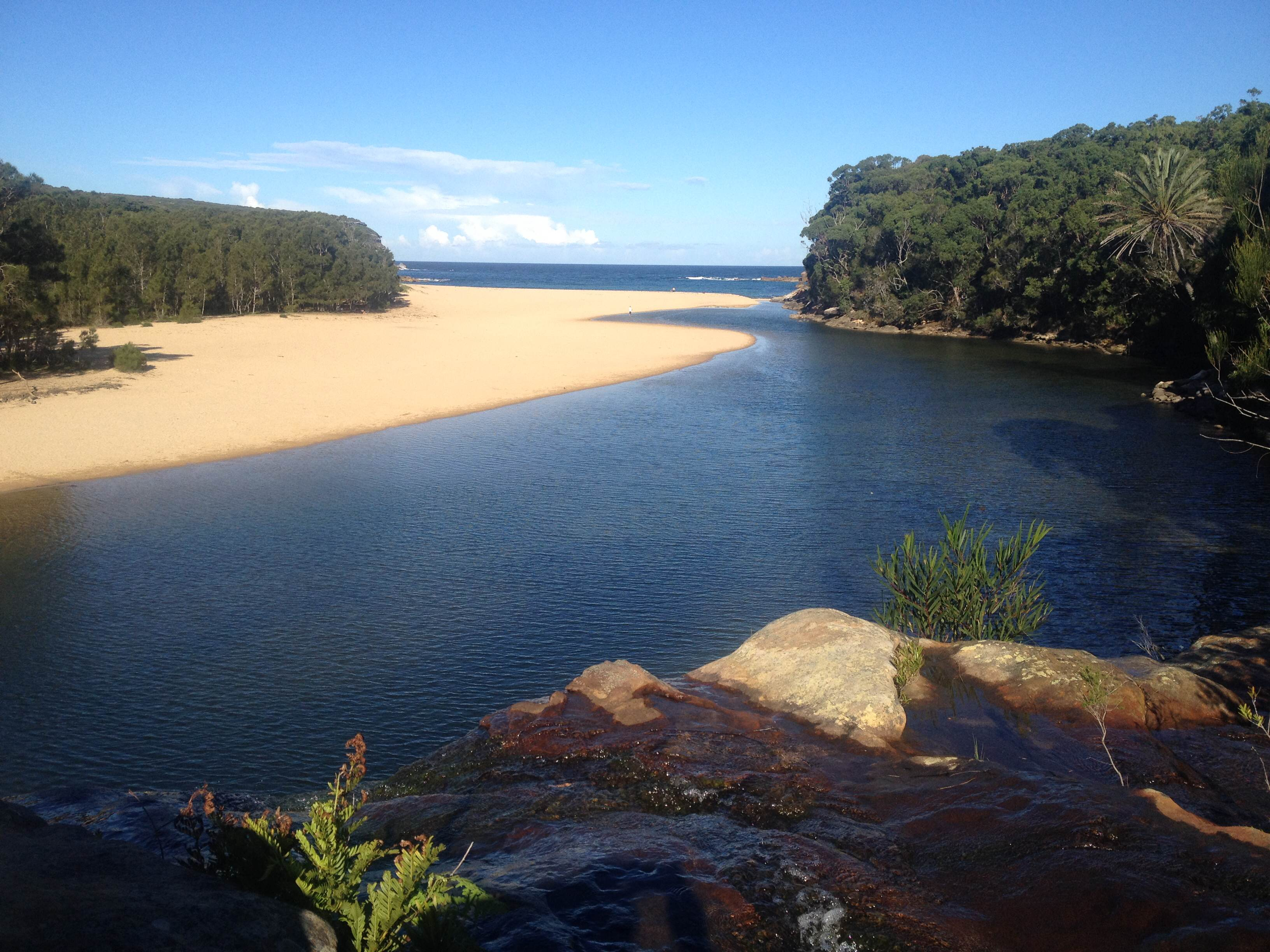
Wattamolla, a lagoon and beach complex popular among visitors of the Royal National Park during summer

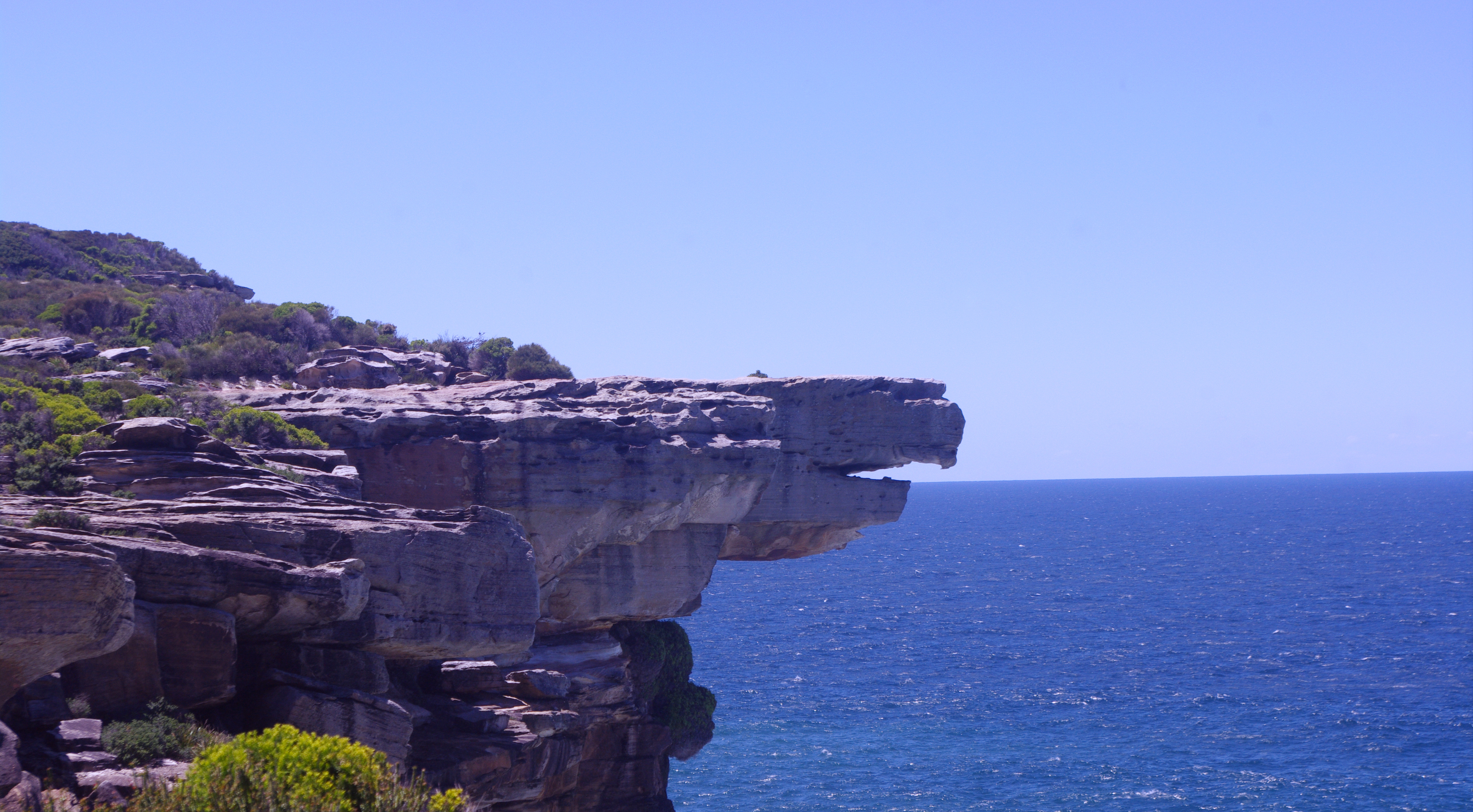
The "Eagle Head" rock formation on the Coast Track, as viewed in November 2016

- Audley – a large, flat area at the base of one of the larger valleys in the park. The main road into the park from the north drops quickly from the heights to Audley, where it crosses the Hacking River on a weir before climbing up the other side of the valley to continue further into the park. Audley was developed in the late 19th century as a picnic area for Sydneysiders on a day trip. A large, heritage listed timber boathouse from that time still exists on the western bank of the weir and currently rents rowing boats and canoes to allow leisurely exploration of the upper reaches of the river. It also rents mountain bikes. A timber dance hall built in the early 20th century on the eastern bank is available for functions. Large picnic areas, grassy meadows and a café, rest rooms and a colony of hungry ducks complete the picnic picture. Audley is as popular with families today as it was in the 19th century. After a heavy rain the weir floods, closing the road and forcing the residents of Bundeena to drive an extra 30 kilometres to the southern end of the park if they wish to drive to Sydney.
- Jibbon Point – This is the southern head of Port Hacking and has fine views over the Sutherland peninsula. Aboriginal rock art sites are visible which were used as initiation sites, the name Jibbon stems from the Dharawal word for Port Hacking, "Djeebun".
- Eagle Rock – A unique rock formation near Curracarong, about halfway down the length of the park on the coast. It is a large rock outcrop that looks like an eagle's head when viewed from the side. The other remarkable feature of Curracarong are the several waterfalls which tumble over the cliffs and into the sea over one hundred metres below.
- Garie Beach – One of the most popular coastal surf beaches in the park.
- Wattamolla Beach – a large lagoon tucked behind the beach, which then enters the sea via an ankle-deep stream at one end of the beach. Families enjoy playing in the calm lagoon with their young children whilst adults enjoy the clean, even surf. There is substantial parking places provided but on busy summer Sundays and public holidays, it can fill up early. Wattamolla is a sheltered cove with a sandy bar at the inlet behind which lies a lagoon fed by the waters of Wattamolla Creek and Coote Creek. Coote Creek finds its way down another valley, then as a beautiful waterfall, it rushes over a sandstone rock face into the lagoon below.
- "Figure 8" pool south of Burning Palms
- Werrong Beach – the only legal naturist beach in the park. It faces east towards the Tasman Sea. The hill behind the beach is covered in trees and undergrowth. Those who camp overnight can be woken at dawn by wallabies wandering around the campsite or a Ranger who might fine you for illegal camping.
- Lady Carrington Drive was one of the early roads through the park. It runs south from Audley, roughly following the Hacking River upstream from the weir for a distance of about 10 kilometres (6.2 mi) to its end, where it meets the main sealed road through the park (there is limited parking at the southern end). The road was a popular carriage drive in the late 19th and early 20th centuries. It had long been closed to traffic and now forms one of the most popular walking and cycling tracks in the park. It is mostly flat and well formed (although unsealed) and being a former road averages 4 to 5 metres (13 to 16 ft) in width. It passes through valley floor vegetation and in spring is lit up by brilliant yellow displays of wattle trees and oranges and reds of the Australian native banksia trees and waratah flowers. Many secondary schools in the Sutherland Shire area use Lady Carrington Drive for an annual sports or fundraising event where their students walk from the southern end through to Audley where a large barbecue picnic is held.
- North and South Era beaches. Camping at North Era campground overlooking North Era beach in Royal National Park is allowed. North Era's bush campsites are perfectly located for an overnight stop while walking the Coast Track. Burning Palms Beach - A common rest place for hikers travelling along the royal coastal walk. Surrounded by the distinctive palms the beach is known for the adjacent "Figure 8" rock pools.
- Winnifred Falls and South West Arm Pool – Natural formed freshwater and saltwater waterholes at the base of Winnifred Falls on South West Arm Creek.
- Royal Coastal Walk – Most popular track in the park spanning from Bundeena to Burning Palms and up to the Otford Cliffs.
- Stanwell Park / Bald Hill - Popular with hang gliders and Aurora Australis enthusiasts. Great views of the Sea Cliff Bridge from here.

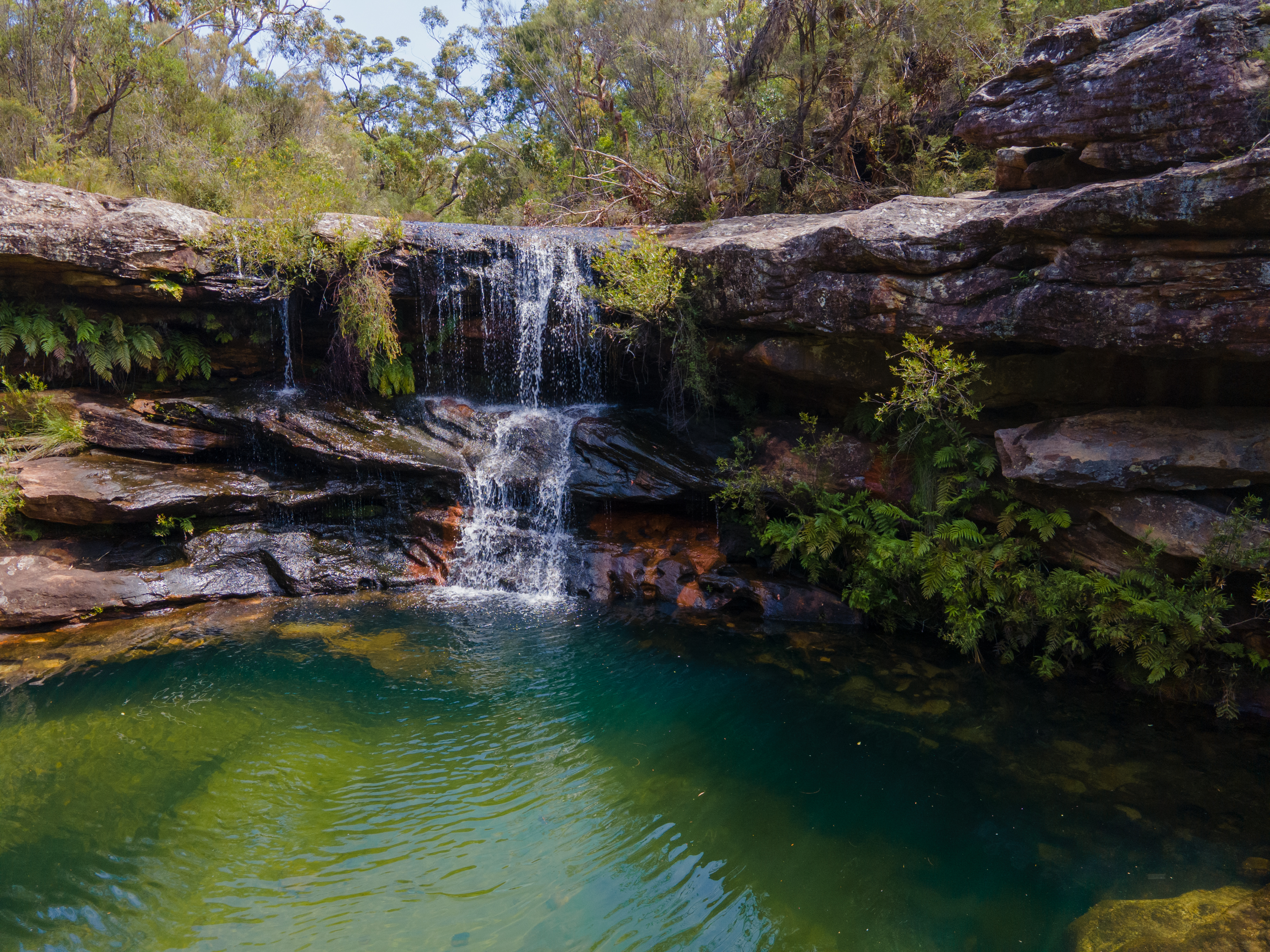
Many waterholes such as this one are found in the many creeks throughout the park.

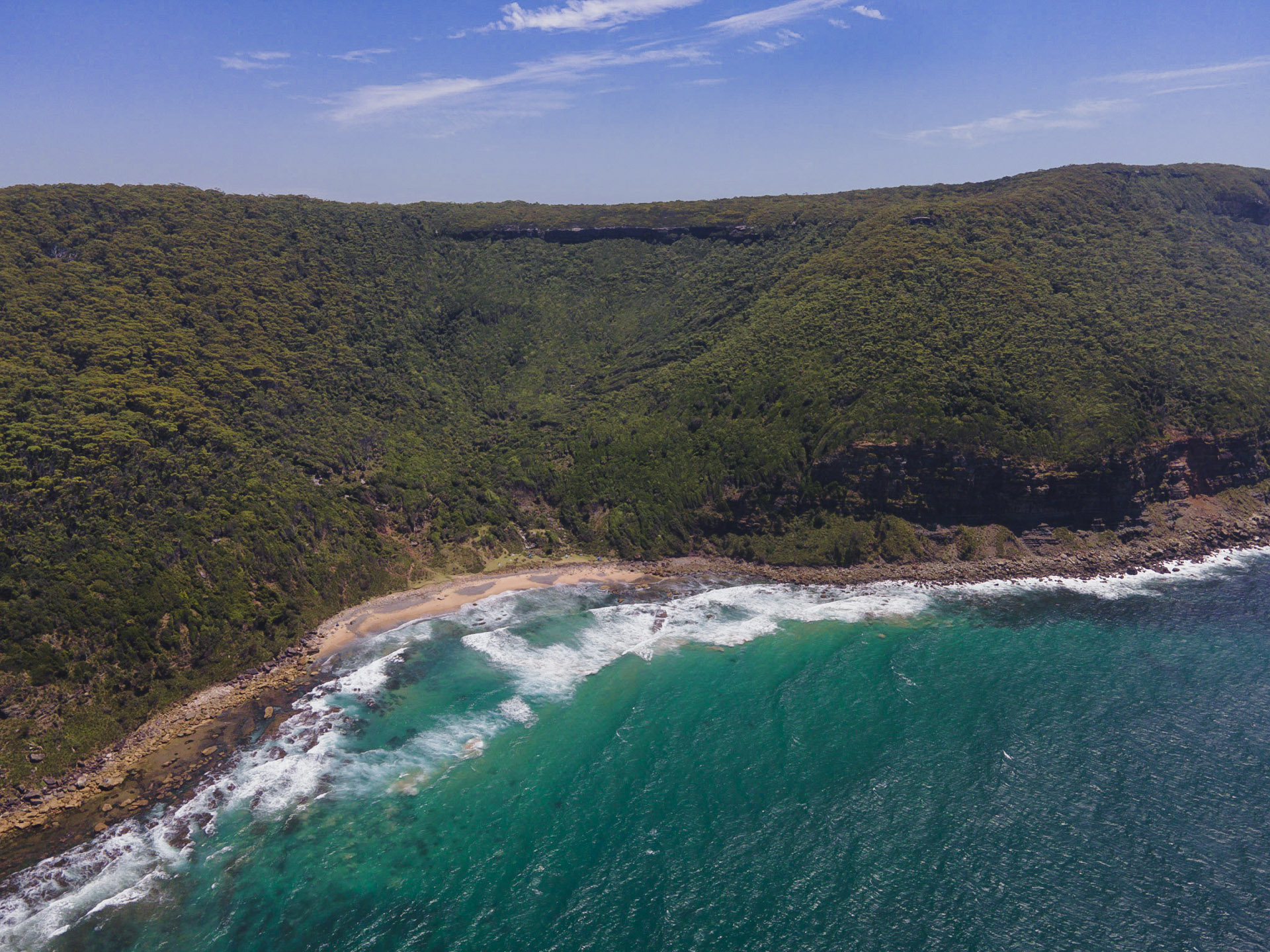
Werrong Beach, Royal National Park, New South Wales.

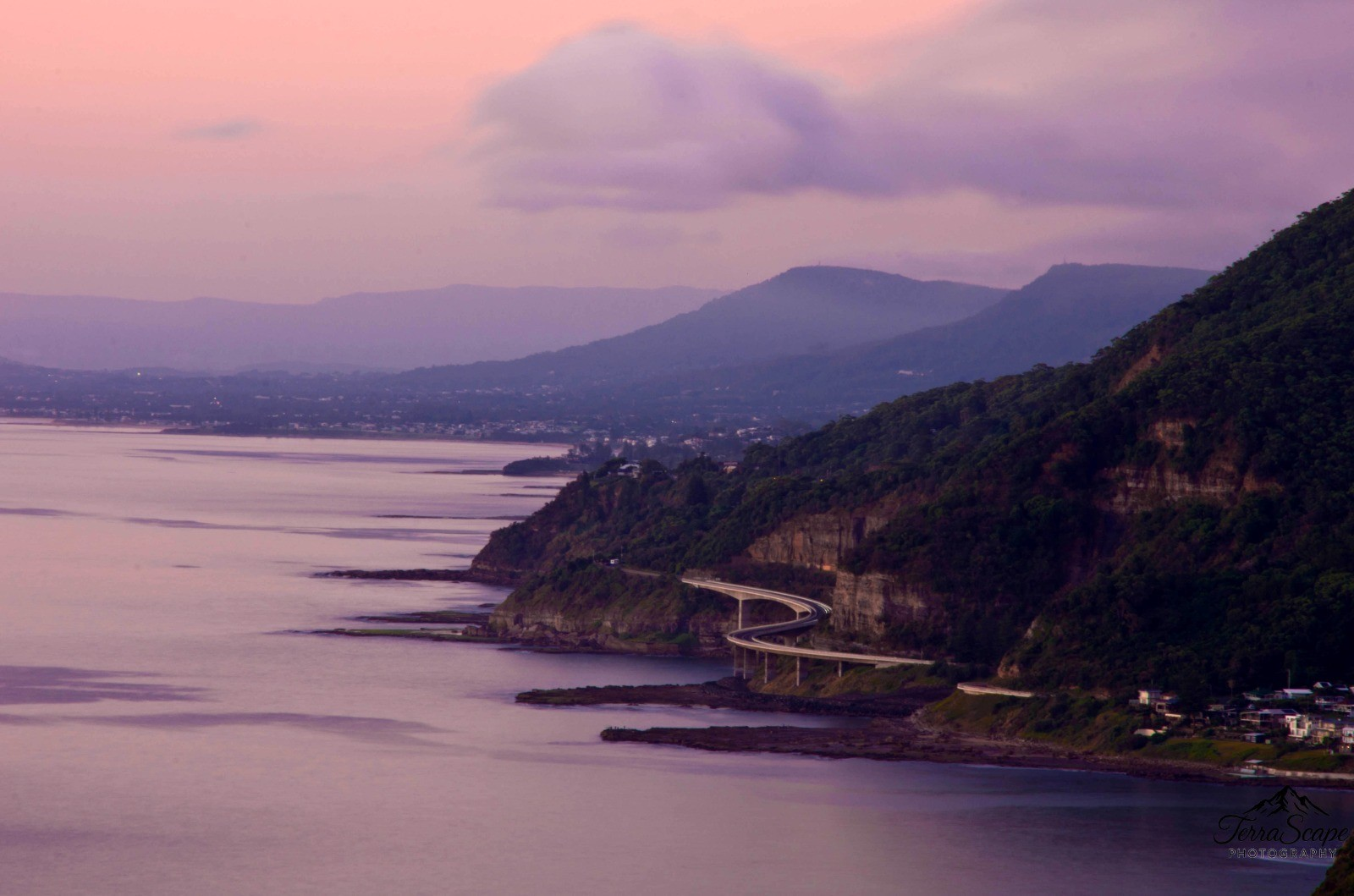
Bald Hill Lookout with views of the Sea Cliff Bridge on Lawrence Hargrave Drive

== Heritage listings ==
Royal National Park has a number of heritage-listed sites, including:

- Royal National Park Coastal Cabin Communities

== Naturism ==
Royal National Park offers one legally sanctioned and several unofficial naturist beaches. Werrong Beach is "the only authorised nude bathing area in the national park". Informally listed places include Little Jibbon Beach, Jibbon Beach, and Ocean Beach.

== Gallery ==
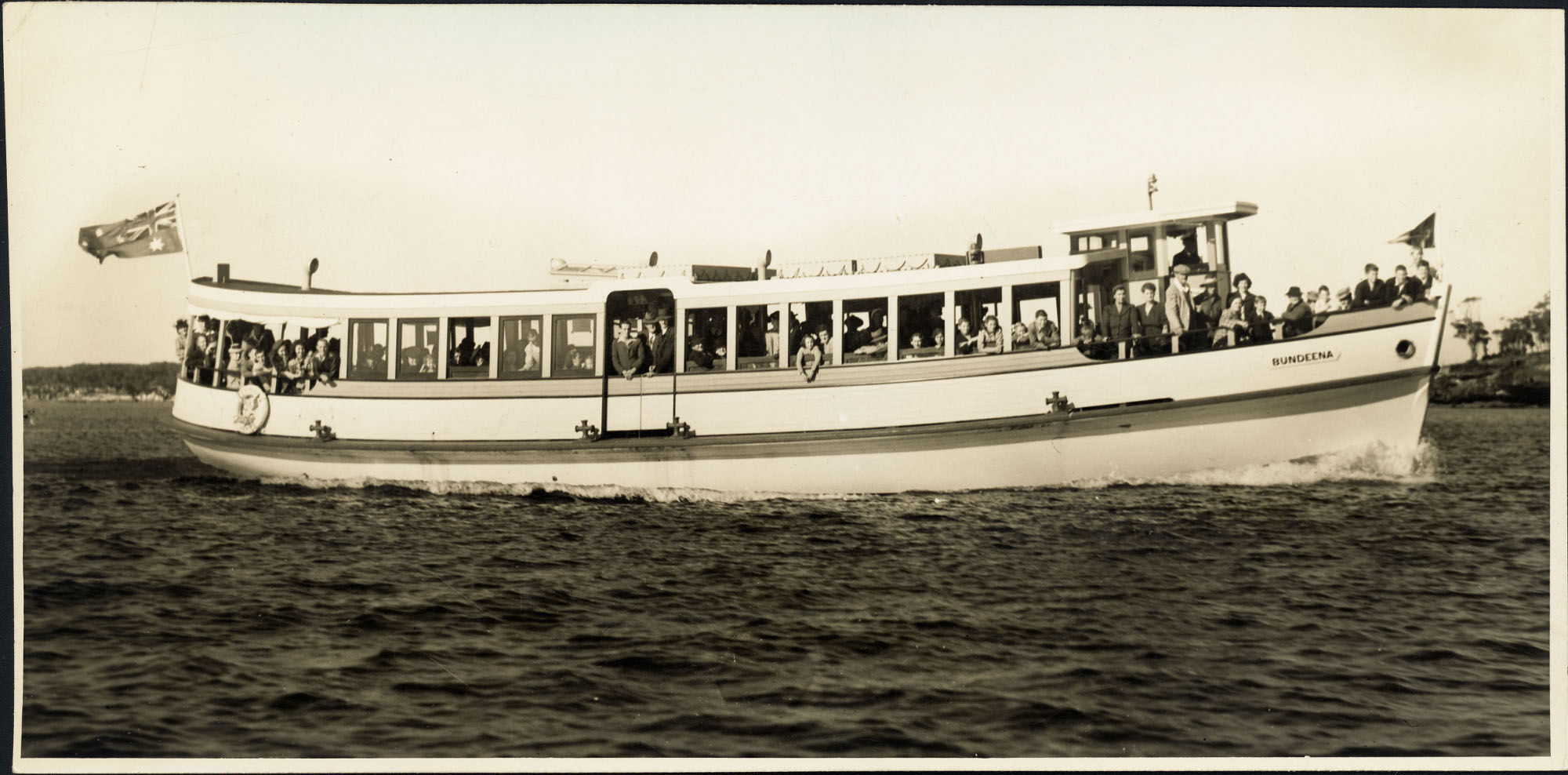
The ferry 'Bundeena' at Royal National Park

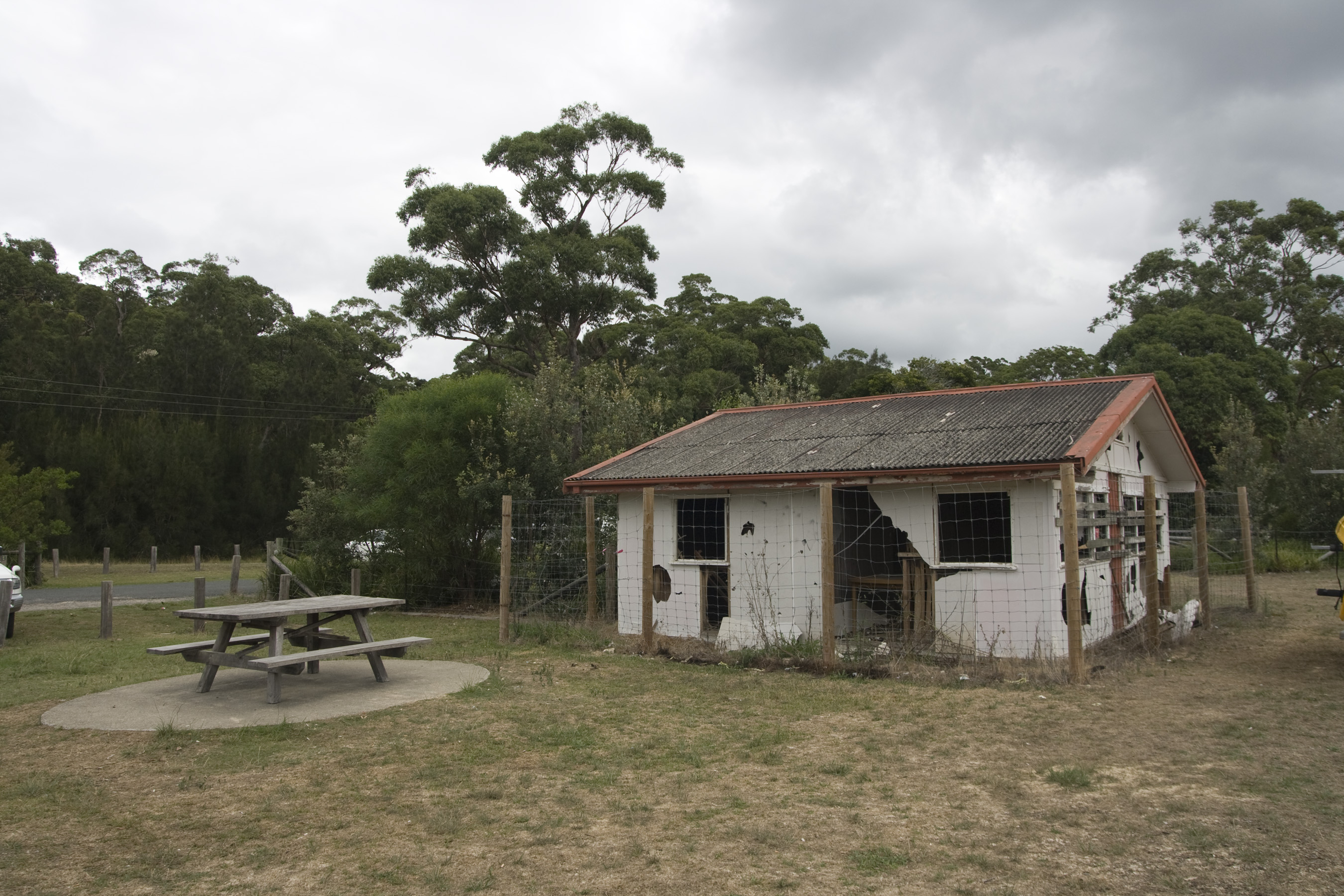
Bonnie Vale Access Road

== See also ==
- Protected areas of New South Wales
- Geography of Sydney
