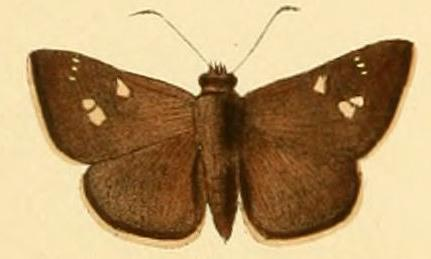

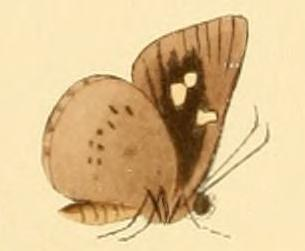

Scientific classification
- Kingdom: Animalia
- Phylum: Arthropoda
- Clade: Pancrustacea
- Class: Insecta
- Order: Lepidoptera
- Family: Hesperiidae
- Genus: Mesodina
- Species: M. halyzia

Binomial name
- Mesodina halyzia (Hewitson, 1868)

Synonyms
- Hesperilla halyzia Hewitson, 1868

= Mesodina halyzia =

Species of butterfly

Mesodina halyzia, the eastern iris-skipper or halyzia skipper, is a butterfly of the family Hesperiidae. It is endemic to the Australian states of New South Wales, Queensland and Victoria.

The wingspan is about 30 mm.

The larvae feed on Patersonia fragilis, Patersonia glabrata, Patersonia occidentalis and Patersonia sericea.
