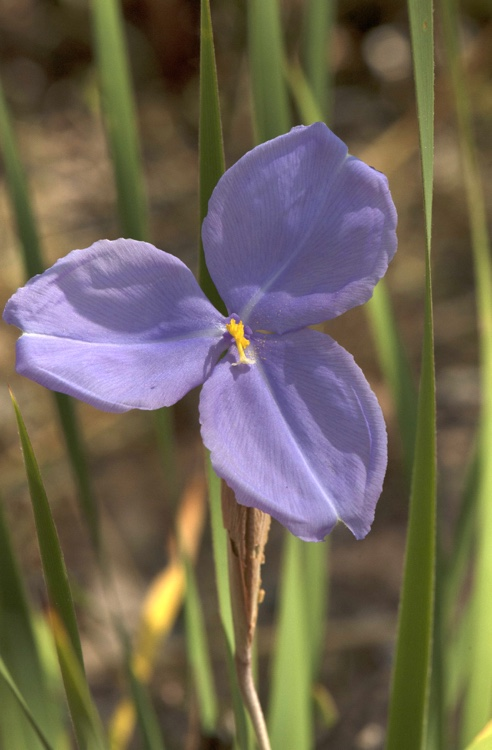
- In Kakadu National Park

Scientific classification
- Kingdom: Plantae
- Clade: Tracheophytes
- Clade: Angiosperms
- Clade: Monocots
- Order: Asparagales
- Family: Iridaceae
- Genus: Patersonia
- Species: P. macrantha

Binomial name
- Patersonia macrantha Benth.

Synonyms
- Genosiris macrantha (Benth.) Kuntze

= Patersonia macrantha =

Species of flowering plant

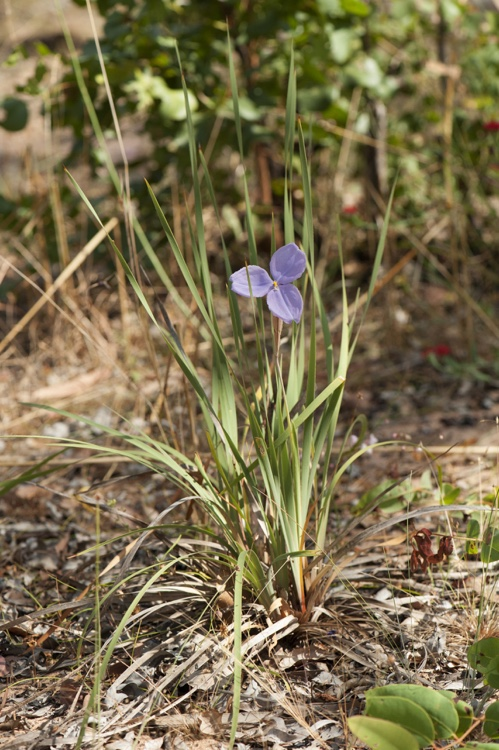
Habit

Patersonia macrantha is a species of plant in the iris family Iridaceae and is endemic to the northern part of the Northern Territory. It is a tuft-forming herb with linear to sword-shaped leaves and pale violet tepals.

== Description ==
Patersonia macrantha is a tuft-forming herb with flat, linear to sword-shaped leaves 180–450 mm (7.1–17.7 in) long and 4–9 mm (0.16–0.35 in) wide. The flowering scape is 220–500 mm (8.7–19.7 in) long, smooth and softly-hairy near the tip, and the sheath enclosing the flowers is elliptic, 43–68 mm (1.7–2.7 in) long and pale brown. The outer tepals are pale violet, egg-shaped with the narrower end towards the base, or elliptic, 30–40 mm (1.2–1.6 in) long and 25–30 mm (0.98–1.18 in) wide. Flowering occurs from January to March.

== Taxonomy and naming ==
Patersonia macrantha was first described in 1846 by George Bentham in Flora Australiensis. Bentham recorded that the type specimens were collected in the Darling Range by Alexander Collie. However, the sheet bearing the type specimens in the Kew Herbarium was inscribed "Armstrong, Port Essington" in W.J. Hooker's handwriting, later crossed out by Bentham with a note "probably Darling Range, Collie (the loose scape was with the Darling Range occidentalis)". The specific epithet (macrantha) means "large-flowered".

== Distribution and habitat ==
This patersonia is widespread in the northern part of the Northern Territory where it grows in forest and woodland.

== Conservation status ==
Patersonia macrantha is classified as "least concern" under the Northern Territory Government Northern Territory Government Territory Parks and Wildlife Conservation Act 1976.
