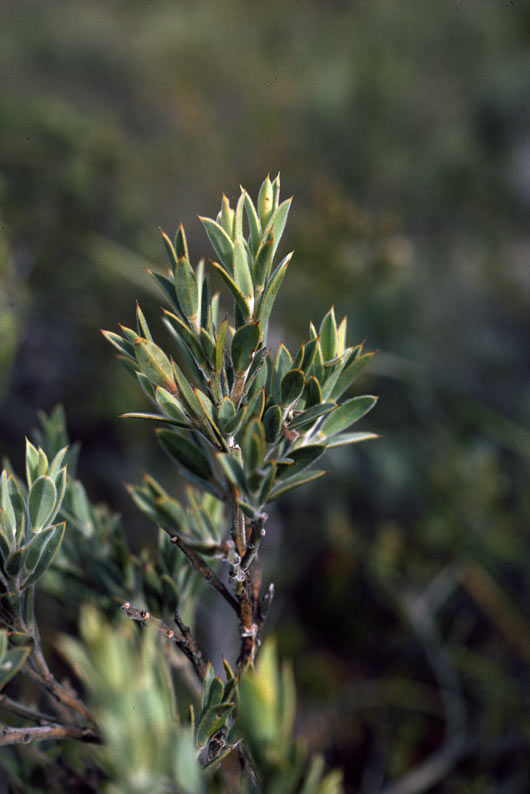
- Near Ravensthorpe

Scientific classification
- Kingdom: Plantae
- Clade: Tracheophytes
- Clade: Angiosperms
- Clade: Eudicots
- Clade: Rosids
- Order: Fabales
- Family: Fabaceae
- Subfamily: Faboideae
- Genus: Daviesia
- Species: D. abnormis

Binomial name
- Daviesia abnormis F.Muell.

Synonyms
- Latrobea abnormis (F.Muell.) Druce; Latrobea pungens Benth. nom. illeg., nom. superfl.

= Daviesia abnormis =

Species of flowering plant

Daviesia abnormis is a species of flowering plant in the family Fabaceae and is endemic to the south-west of Western Australia. It is an erect, hairy shrub with sharply-pointed, narrow elliptic to narrow egg-shaped phyllodes with the narrower end towards the base, and yellow flowers with faint red markings.

== Description ==
Daviesia abnormis is an erect shrub that typically grows to a height of 30–70 cm (12–28 in) and has densely hairy foliage. The phyllodes are crowded near the ends of branchlets and are sharply pointed, narrow elliptic to narrow egg-shaped with the narrower end towards the base, 13–23 mm (0.51–0.91 in) long and 3–8 mm (0.12–0.31 in) wide. The flowers are arranged singly on a pedicel 1–3 mm (0.039–0.118 in) long with bracts about 1 mm (0.039 in) long, the flowers almost obscured by the phyllodes. The five sepals are 4–5 mm (0.16–0.20 in) long and joined at the base, the two upper lobes more or less fused and the lower three triangular. The petals are yellow with faint red markings, the standard petal 11–13 mm (0.43–0.51 in) long, the wings 9–11 mm (0.35–0.43 in) long and the keel sac-like and 10–11 mm (0.39–0.43 in) long. Flowering occurs in March and April and the fruit is a flattened pod 11–13 mm (0.43–0.51 in) long.

== Taxonomy and naming ==
Daviesia abnormis was first formally described in 1860 by Ferdinand von Mueller in Fragmenta Phytographiae Australiae from specimens collected by George Maxwell. The specific epithet (abnormis) means "irregular" or "unconventional".

== Distribution ==
This species of pea mainly grows in kwongan in the Esperance Plains and Mallee biogeographic regions in the south-west of Western Australia.

== Conservation status ==
This daviesia is classified as "not threatened" by the Government of Western Australia Department of Biodiversity, Conservation and Attractions.
