= Leucopogon acicularis =

Scientific classification
- Kingdom: Plantae
- Clade: Tracheophytes
- Clade: Angiosperms
- Clade: Eudicots
- Clade: Asterids
- Order: Ericales
- Family: Ericaceae
- Genus: Leucopogon
- Species: L. acicularis

Binomial name
- Leucopogon acicularis Benth.
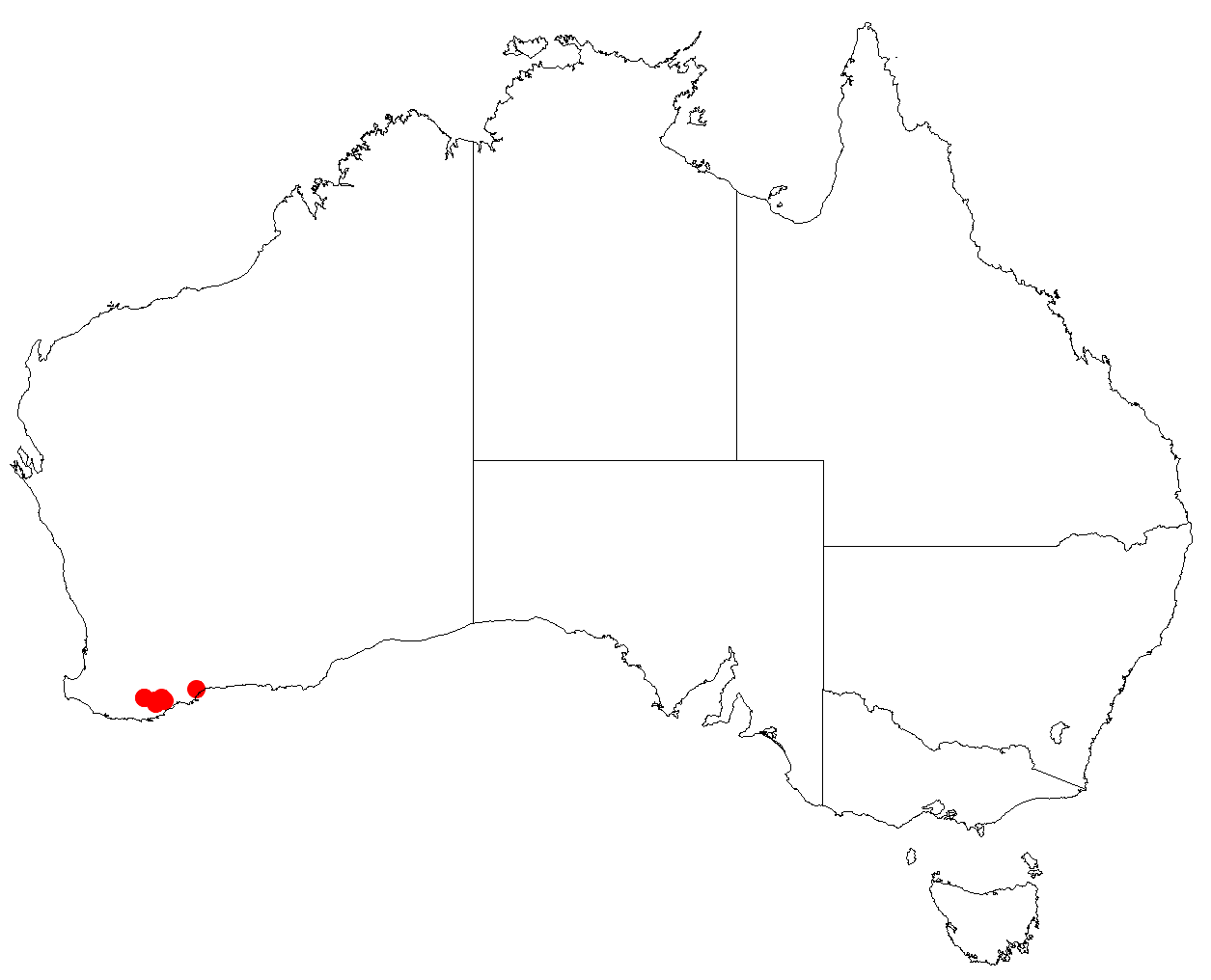
- Occurrence data from AVH

Synonyms
- Styphelia acicularis (Benth.) F.Muell.

Species of shrub

Leucopogon acicularis is a species of flowering plant in the family Ericaceae and is endemic to the south-west of Western Australia. It is an erect, open shrub that typically grows to a height of 0.2–1 m (7.9 in – 3 ft 3.4 in) and is mostly found in the Stirling Range National Park in the Esperance Plains bioregion.

It was first formally described in 1868 by George Bentham in Flora Australiensis from specimens collected by George Maxwell. The specific epithet (acicularis) means "needle-pointed", referring to the leaves.
