= Patersonia inaequalis =

Unequal bract patersonia

Conservation status
- Priority Two — Poorly Known Taxa (DEC)

Scientific classification
- Kingdom: Plantae
- Clade: Tracheophytes
- Clade: Angiosperms
- Clade: Monocots
- Order: Asparagales
- Family: Iridaceae
- Genus: Patersonia
- Species: P. inaequalis

Binomial name
- Patersonia inaequalis Benth.

Synonyms
- Genosiris inaequalis (Benth.) Kuntze

Species of flowering plant

Patersonia inaequalis, commonly known as unequal bract patersonia, is a species of plant in the iris family Iridaceae and is endemic to a restricted part of the south-west of Western Australia. It is a tufted herb with linear, often twisted leaves and white tepals.

== Description ==
Patersonia inaequalis is a tufted herb that with erect stems up to 600 mm (24 in) long. The leaves are linear, often twisted, 110–320 mm (4.3–12.6 in) long, 1.2–2.5 mm (0.047–0.098 in) wide, the leaf bases surrounding the stem. The flowering scape is 180–230 mm (7.1–9.1 in) long with the two sheaths enclosing the flowers of different lengths. The outer tepals are white, 10–15 mm (0.39–0.59 in) long and 8–14 mm (0.31–0.55 in) wide, and the hypanthium tube is 20–28 mm (0.79–1.10 in) long and glabrous. Flowering mainly occurs from August to October.

== Taxonomy and naming ==
Patersonia inaequalis was first described in 1873 by George Bentham in Flora Australiensis, from specimens collected by George Maxwell at Stokes Inlet. The specific epithet (inaequalis) means "unequal", referring to the bracts.

== Distribution and habitat ==
Unequal bract patersonia grows in heath and scrub on the coast of southern Western Australia between Stokes Inlet and Mondrain Island in the Recherche Archipelago.

== Conservation status ==
Patersonia inaequalis is classified as "Priority Two" by the Western Australian Government Department of Biodiversity, Conservation and Attractions, meaning that it is poorly known and from only one or a few locations.
