= P. juncea =

P. juncea may refer to:

- Patersonia juncea, a purple flag
- Platysace juncea, a perennial plant
- Pocadicnemis juncea, a sheet weaver
- Prenanthes juncea, a plant with fascicled stems
- Psathyrostachys juncea, a grass native to Russia and China
