= Leucopogon bossiaea =

Conservation status
- Priority Two — Poorly Known Taxa (DEC)

Scientific classification
- Kingdom: Plantae
- Clade: Tracheophytes
- Clade: Angiosperms
- Clade: Eudicots
- Clade: Asterids
- Order: Ericales
- Family: Ericaceae
- Genus: Leucopogon
- Species: L. bossiaea

Binomial name
- Leucopogon bossiaea (F.Muell.) Benth.
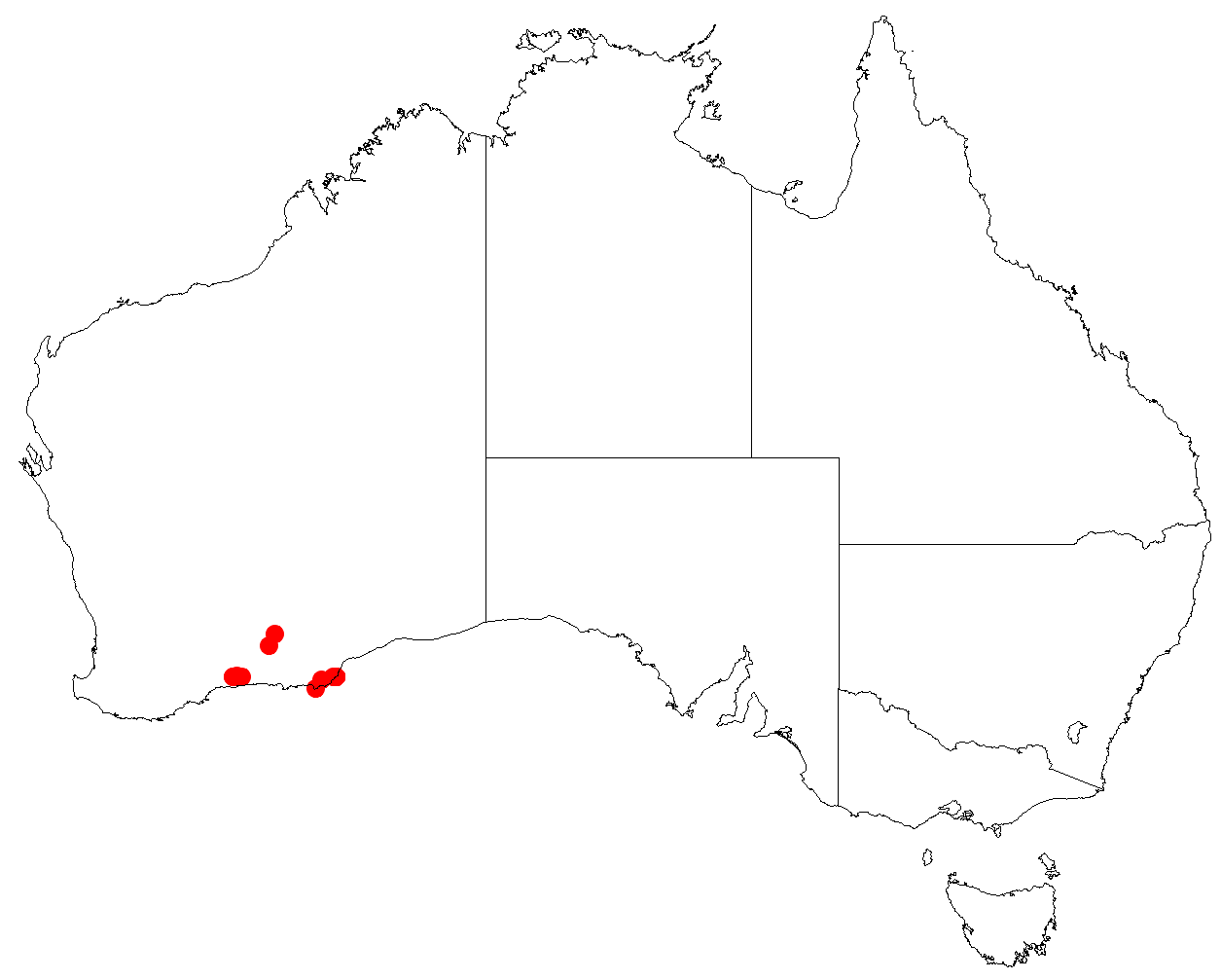
- Occurrence data from AVH

Species of plant

Leucopogon bossiaea is a species of flowering plant in the heath family Ericaceae and is endemic to a restricted area in the south-west of Western Australia. It is an erect shrub with elliptic to broadly egg-shaped leaves and white flowers in four to eleven upper leaf axils.

== Description ==
Leucopogon bossiaea is an erect shrub that typically grows up to about 100 cm (39 in) high and 80 cm (31 in) wide. The leaves are spirally arranged and point upwards, glabrous, elliptic to broadly egg-shaped to almost round, 2.6–4.1 mm (0.10–0.16 in) long and 2.1–3.9 mm (0.083–0.154 in) wide on a glabrous petiole 0.5–1.0 mm (0.020–0.039 in) long. The flowers are arranged in groups of four to eleven on the ends of branchlets and in upper leaf axils, with egg-shaped bracts 0.5–0.6 mm (0.020–0.024 in) long and similar, longer bracteoles. The sepals are egg-shaped, 1.4–1.9 mm (0.055–0.075 in) long and often tinged with purple. The petals are white and joined at the base to form a bell-shaped tube 1.1–1.5 mm (0.043–0.059 in) long, the lobes 1.5–2.0 mm (0.059–0.079 in) long. The fruit is a glabrous, spherical drupe 1.3–1.6 mm (0.051–0.063 in) long and wide.

== Taxonomy and naming ==
This species was first formally described in 1867 by Ferdinand von Mueller who gave it the name Styphelia bossiaea in Fragmenta Phytographiae Australiae from specimens collected by George Maxwell. In 1868, George Bentham changed the name to Leucopogon bossiaea in Flora Australiensis. The specific epithet (bossiaea) is a reference to the genus Bossiaea.

== Distribution and habitat ==
This leucopogon usually grows in mallee woodlands or heath but is only known from near Israelite Bay in the Esperance plains bioregion in the south-west of Western Australia.

== Conservation status ==
Leucopogon borealis is classified as "Priority Two" by the Western Australian Government Department of Biodiversity, Conservation and Attractions, meaning that it is poorly known and from only one or a few locations.
