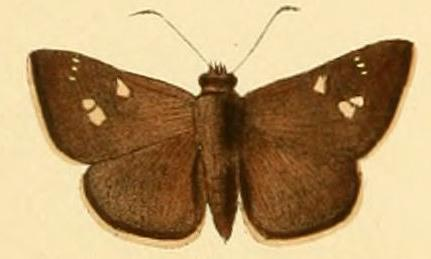
- Mesodina halyzia

Scientific classification
- Kingdom: Animalia
- Phylum: Arthropoda
- Clade: Pancrustacea
- Class: Insecta
- Order: Lepidoptera
- Family: Hesperiidae
- Subfamily: Trapezitinae
- Genus: Mesodina; Meyrick, 1901

Species
- See text

= Mesodina =

Genus of butterflies

Mesodina is a genus of skipper butterflies in the family Hesperiidae.

== Species ==
The genus includes the following species:

- Mesodina aeluropis Meyrick, 1901
- Mesodina hayi E.D. Edwards & Graham, 1995
- Mesodina halyzia Hewitson, 1868
- Mesodina cyanophracta Lower, 1911
- Mesodina gracillima E.D. Edwards, 1987
