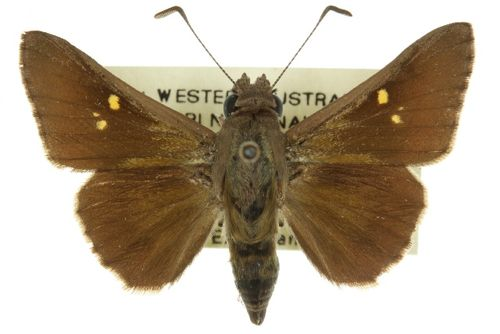

Scientific classification
- Kingdom: Animalia
- Phylum: Arthropoda
- Class: Insecta
- Order: Lepidoptera
- Family: Hesperiidae
- Genus: Mesodina
- Species: M. hayi

Binomial name
- Mesodina hayi E.D. Edwards & Graham, 1995

= Mesodina hayi =

Species of butterfly

Mesodina hayi, the small iris-skipper, is a butterfly of the family Hesperiidae. It is endemic to the north-west and south-west coast of the state of Western Australia.

The wingspan is about 30 mm.
