= Patersonia pygmaea =

Scientific classification
- Kingdom: Plantae
- Clade: Tracheophytes
- Clade: Angiosperms
- Clade: Monocots
- Order: Asparagales
- Family: Iridaceae
- Genus: Patersonia
- Species: P. pygmaea

Binomial name
- Patersonia pygmaea Lindl.

Synonyms
- Genosiris pygmaea (Lindl.) F.Muell.

Species of flowering plant

Patersonia pygmaea is a species of plant in the iris family Iridaceae and is endemic to the south-west of Western Australia. It is a tufted, rhizome-forming perennial herb with sword-shaped leaves and bluish-violet to purple tepals.

== Description ==
Patersonia pygmaea is a tufted perennial herb that forms a rhizome and has woody stems 20–30 mm (0.79–1.18 in) long. The leaves are glabrous, sword-shaped, 50–150 mm (2.0–5.9 in) long and 1.5–2.5 mm (0.059–0.098 in) wide. The flowering scape is 10–60 mm (0.39–2.36 in) long and glabrous and dark brown. The outer tepals are bluish-violet to purple, broadly egg-shaped with the narrower end towards the base, 15–25 mm (0.59–0.98 in) long and 12–18 mm (0.47–0.71 in) wide, the hypanthium tube 25–35 mm (0.98–1.38 in) long and glabrous. Flowering occurs from September to October and the fruit is an oval capsule 20–25 mm (0.79–0.98 in) long, containing brown seeds.

== Taxonomy and naming ==
Patersonia pygmaea was first described in 1840 by John Lindley in A Sketch of the Vegetation of the Swan River Colony. The specific epithet (pygmaea) means "dwarf".

== Distribution and habitat ==
This patersonia grows in forest and heathland from the Darling Range to the Stirling Range and Albany.

== Conservation status ==
Patersonia pygmaea is classified as "not threatened" by the Western Australian Government Department of Biodiversity, Conservation and Attractions.
