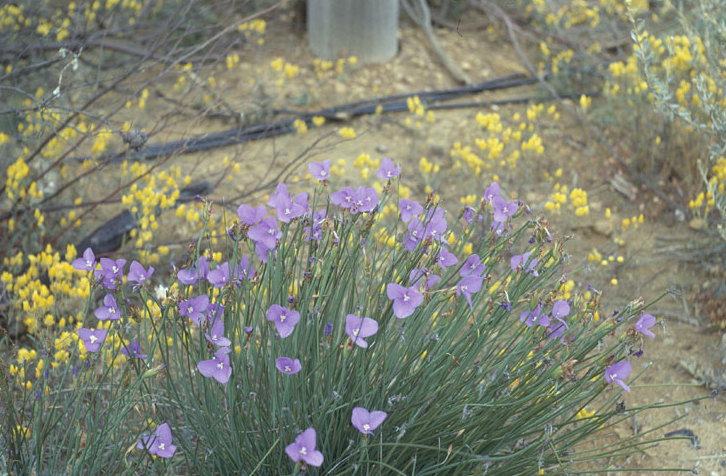
- Patersonia graminea near Morawa

Scientific classification
- Kingdom: Plantae
- Clade: Tracheophytes
- Clade: Angiosperms
- Clade: Monocots
- Order: Asparagales
- Family: Iridaceae
- Genus: Patersonia
- Species: P. graminea

Binomial name
- Patersonia graminea Benth.

Synonyms
- Genosiris graminea (Benth.) Kuntze

= Patersonia graminea =

Grass-leaved patersonia

Species of flowering plant

Patersonia graminea, commonly known as grass-leaved patersonia, is a species of plant in the iris family Iridaceae and is endemic to the south-west of Western Australia. It is a clump-forming herb with linear, grass-like leaves and pale violet tepals.

== Description ==
Patersonia graminea is a rhizome-forming herb that forms dense clumps. The leaves are linear, 50–160 mm (2.0–6.3 in) long, 1–3 mm (0.039–0.118 in) wide, keeled and grass-like. The flowering scape is 200–330 mm (7.9–13.0 in) long with the sheath enclosing the flowers lance-shaped, prominently veined, green, glabrous and 15–25 mm (0.59–0.98 in) long. The outer tepals are pale purple, 20–25 mm (0.79–0.98 in) long and up to 20 mm (0.79 in) wide, and the hypanthium tube is about 15 mm (0.59 in) long and glabrous. Flowering mainly occurs from September to October.

== Taxonomy and naming ==
Patersonia graminea was first described in 1873 by George Bentham in Flora Australiensis, from specimens collected by James Drummond. The specific epithet (graminea) means "grass-like".

== Distribution and habitat ==
Grass-leaved patersonia grows in heath and scrub on sandplains and granite outcrops from the coast of south-western Western Australia near the Murchison River to near Watheroo, in the Avon Wheatbelt, Geraldton Sandplains and Yalgoo biogeographic regions.

== Conservation status ==
Patersonia graminea is listed as "not threatened" by the Government of Western Australia Department of Biodiversity, Conservation and Attractions.
