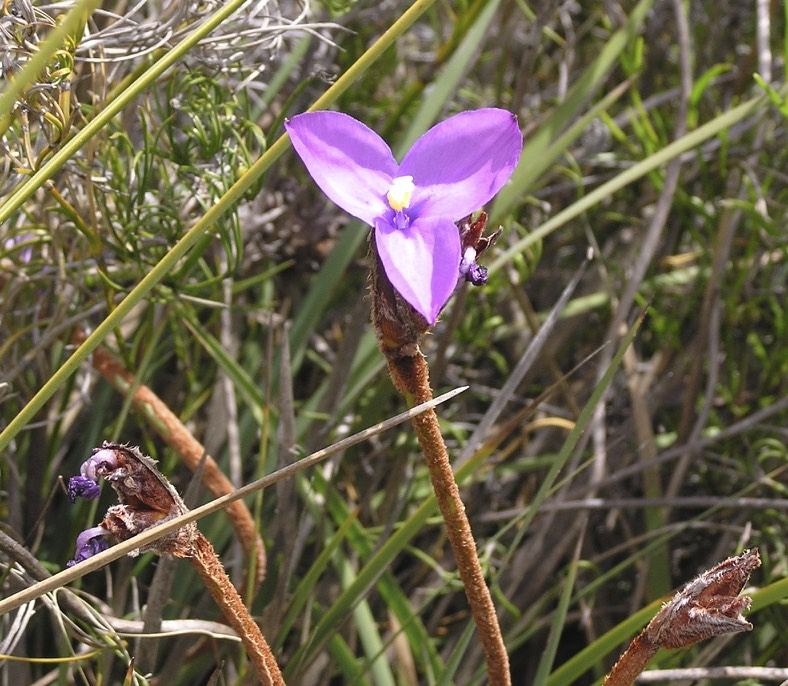
- Patersonia lanata near the Pink Lake

Scientific classification
- Kingdom: Plantae
- Clade: Tracheophytes
- Clade: Angiosperms
- Clade: Monocots
- Order: Asparagales
- Family: Iridaceae
- Genus: Patersonia
- Species: P. lanata

Binomial name
- Patersonia lanata R.Br.

Synonyms
- Genosiris lanata (R.Br.) F.Muell.

= Patersonia lanata =

Woolly patersonia

Species of plant in the family Iridaceae

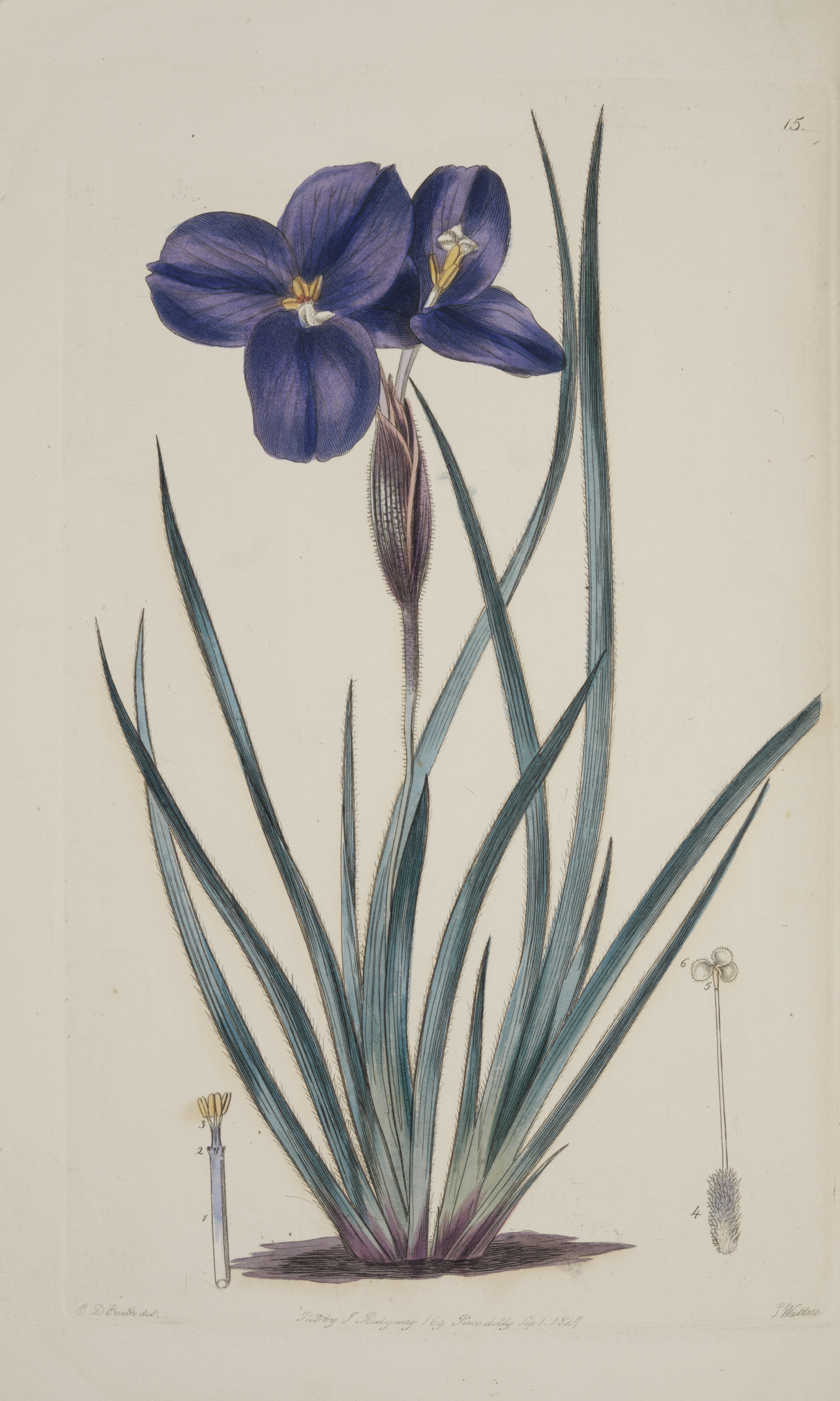
Illustration from Robert Sweet's Flora Australasica

Patersonia lanata, commonly known as woolly patersonia, is a species of flowering plant in the family Iridaceae and is endemic to the south of Western Australia. It is a tufted perennial herb with sword-shaped leaves and blue-violet flowers.

== Description ==
Patersonia lanata is a tufted perennial herb with sword-shaped leaves 150–400 mm (5.9–15.7 in) long, 2–7 mm (0.079–0.276 in) wide and is glabrous apart from woolly hairs near the edges of the leaf base. The flowering scape is 120–400 mm (4.7–15.7 in) long and the sheaths enclosing the flowers are triangular, 25–32 mm (0.98–1.26 in) long and dark brown. The petal-like sepals are bluish violet, broadly elliptic, 20–30 mm (0.79–1.18 in) long and 18–27 mm (0.71–1.06 in) wide and the stamens filaments are 4–5 mm (0.16–0.20 in) long joined for most of their length. Flowering occurs from July to November and the fruit is an oval capsule about 20 mm (0.79 in) long containing wrinkled seeds about 2.5 mm (0.098 in) long.

== Taxonomy ==
Patersonia lanata was first formally described in 1810 by Robert Brown in his Prodromus Florae Novae Hollandiae et Insulae Van Diemen. The specific epithet (lanata) means "woolly", referring to the edges of the leaves, the scape, bracts and ovary.

In 1986, David Alan Cooke described two forms of Patersonia lanata and the names are accepted by the Australian Plant Census:

- Patersonia lanata f. calvata D.A.Cooke has glabrous leaf margins and a more or less glabrous scape;
- Patersonia lanata R.Br. f. lanata D.A.Cooke has leaf margins that have woolly brown hairs near the base and a woolly-brown scape.

== Distribution and habitat ==
Woolly patersonia grows in heath on the coastal plain of southern Western Australia between Two Peoples Bay and Israelite Bay in the Esperance Plains, Jarrah Forest and Mallee biogeographic regions. Both forms occur in the same range, but f. calvata is less common.
