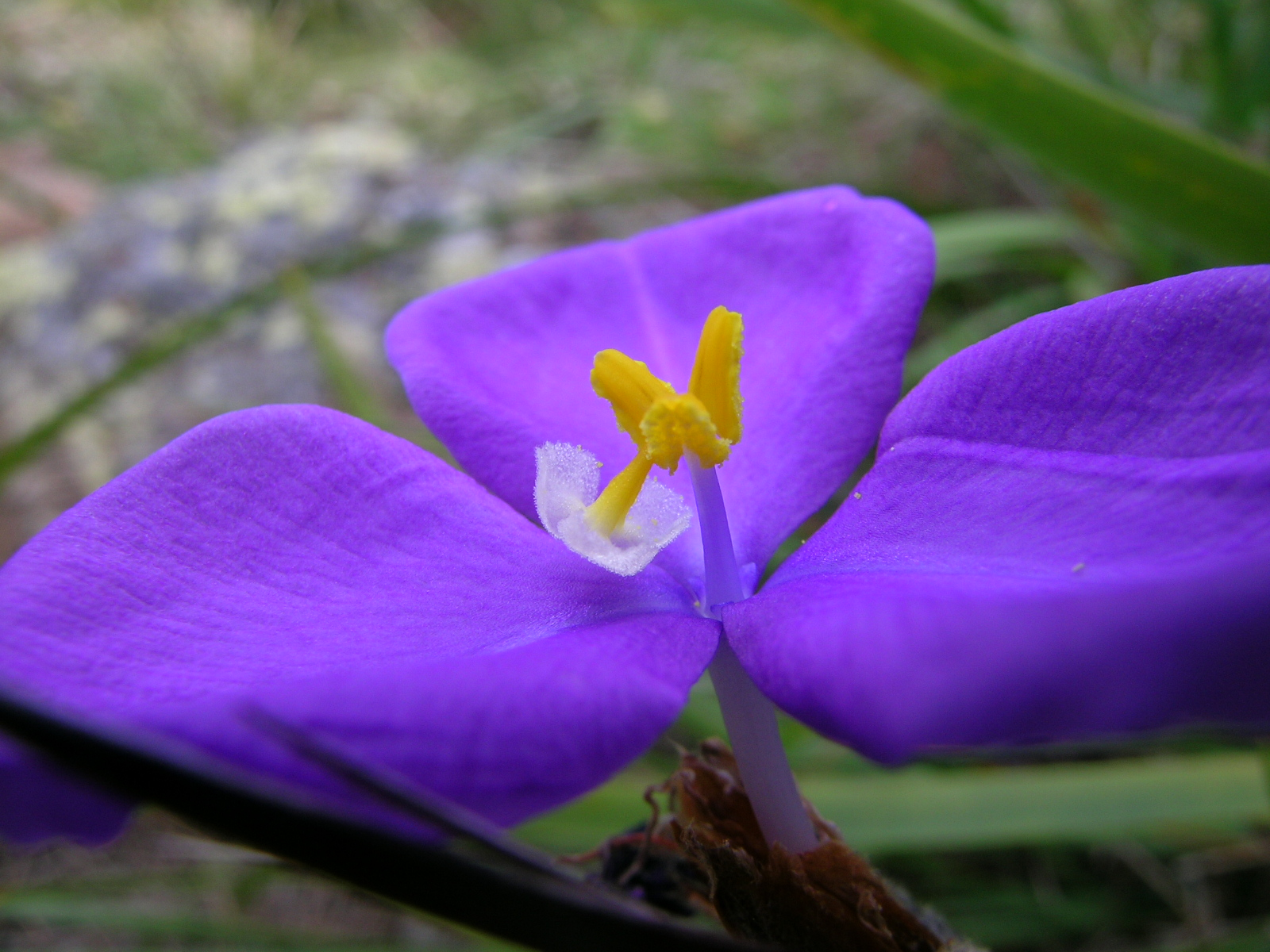
- Patersonia sericea

Scientific classification
- Kingdom: Plantae
- Clade: Tracheophytes
- Clade: Angiosperms
- Clade: Monocots
- Order: Asparagales
- Family: Iridaceae
- Subfamily: Patersonioideae; Goldblatt
- Genus: Patersonia; R.Br.

Type species
- Patersonia sericea R.Br.

Synonyms
- Genosiris Labill.

= Patersonia =

Genus of flowering plants

Patersonia, is a genus of plants whose species are commonly known as native iris or native flag and are native to areas from Malesia to Australia.

== Description ==
They are perennials with basal leaves growing from a woody rhizome that in some species extends above ground to form a short trunk. The leaves are tough and fibrous, often with adaptations for conserving moisture, such as stomata sunk in grooves, a thickened cross-section, marginal hairs, and thickened margins. The flowers appear from between a pair of bracts on a leafless stem. They have three large outer tepals that are usually blue to violet, and three tiny inner tepals. There are three stamens fused at the base to form a tube around the longer style, which bears a flattened stigma.

== Taxonomy ==
The genus Patersonia was first formally described in 1807 by Robert Brown in the Botanical Magazine. The genus name is a tribute to the first Lieutenant Governor of New South Wales in Australia, William Paterson, "a gentleman whose name has been long familiar to the naturalist".

=== Species list ===
The following is a list of Patersonia species accepted by Plants of the World Online as of October 2021:

- Patersonia argyrea D.A.Cooke (W.A.)
- Patersonia babianoides Benth. (W.A.)
- Patersonia borneensis Stapf (Borneo)
- Patersonia drummondii F.Muell. ex Benth. – Drummond's patersonia (W.A.)
- Patersonia fragilis (Labill.) Asch. & Graebn. - swamp iris, short purple-flag (S.A., Qld., N.S.W., Vic., Tas.)
- Patersonia glabrata R.Br. - leafy purple flag, bugulbi (Qld., N.S.W., Vic.)
- Patersonia graminea Benth. – grass-leaved patersonia (W.A.)
- Patersonia inaequalis Benth. – unequal bract patersonia (W.A.)
- Patersonia inflexa Goldblatt (Papua New Guinea)
- Patersonia juncea Lindl. – rush-leaved patersonia (W.A.)
- Patersonia lanata R.Br. – woolly patersonia (W.A.)
- Patersonia limbata Endl. (W.A.)
- Patersonia lowii Stapf (Borneo)
- Patersonia macrantha Benth. (N.T.)
- Patersonia maxwellii (F.Muell.) F.Muell. ex Benth. (W.A.)
- Patersonia neocaledonica Goldblatt & J.C.Manning (New Caledonia)
- Patersonia novoguineensis Gibbs (New Guinea)
- Patersonia occidentalis R.Br. (W.A., S.A., Vic., Tas.)
- Patersonia philippinensis Goldblatt (Mindoro, Mindanao and Sibuyan, Philippines)
- Patersonia pygmaea Lindl. (W.A.)
- Patersonia rudis Endl. (W.A.)
  - Petersonia rudis Endl. subsp. rudis
  - Petersonia rudis subsp. velutina D.A.Cooke
- Patersonia sericea R.Br.
  - Patersonia sericea var. longifolia (R.Br.) C.Moore – purple flag (N.S.W., Vic.)
  - Patersonia sericea R.Br. var. sericea – silky purple-flag (Qld., N.S.W., Vic.)
- Patersonia spirafolia Keighery (W.A.)
- Patersonia sumatrensis Goldblatt (Sumatra)
- Patersonia umbrosa Endl. (W.A.)
