= Patersonia borneensis =

Scientific classification
- Kingdom: Plantae
- Clade: Tracheophytes
- Clade: Angiosperms
- Clade: Monocots
- Order: Asparagales
- Family: Iridaceae
- Genus: Patersonia
- Species: P. borneensis

Binomial name
- Patersonia borneensis Stapf

Species of flowering plant

Patersonia borneensis is a species of plant in the iris family Iridaceae and is endemic to a restricted area of Borneo. It is a tufted perennial with many leaves and pale lavender to bluish-purple tepals on a flowering stem shorter than the leaves.

== Description ==
Patersonia borneensis is a tufted, rhizome-forming perennial that typically grows to a height of 350–600 mm (14–24 in) and has many sword-shaped leaves 4–6 mm (0.16–0.24 in) wide. The flowering stem is shorter than the leaves, oval in cross-section, 420–550 mm (17–22 in) long and about 1.5 mm (0.059 in) in diameter with the sheath enclosing the flowers 36–55 mm (1.4–2.2 in) long. The outer tepals are pale lavender to bluish purple, egg-shaped and about 15 mm (0.59 in) long, and the hypanthium tube is about 25 mm (0.98 in) long. Flowering mainly occurs from December to April.

== Taxonomy and naming ==
Patersonia borneensis was first described in 1894 by Otto Stapf in the Journal of the Linnean Society, Botany from specimens collected on Mount Kinabalu by George Darby Haviland in 1892.

== Distribution and habitat ==
This patersonia is restricted to the Mount Kinabalu massif in Sabah, Malaysia where it grows at altitudes between 2,200 and 2,750 m (7,220 and 9,020 ft).
