= Patersonia maxwellii =

Scientific classification
- Kingdom: Plantae
- Clade: Tracheophytes
- Clade: Angiosperms
- Clade: Monocots
- Order: Asparagales
- Family: Iridaceae
- Genus: Patersonia
- Species: P. maxwellii

Binomial name
- Patersonia maxwellii (F.Muell.) F.Muell. ex Benth.

Synonyms
- Genosiris maxweli F.Muell. orth. var.; Genosiris maxwellii F.Muell.

Species of flowering plant

Patersonia maxwellii is a species of flowering plant in the iris family Iridaceae and is endemic to the south of Western Australia. It is a tufted, rhizome-forming perennial herb with linear leaves and violet tepals.

== Description ==
Patersonia maxwellii is a tufted, rhizome-forming perennial herb that has linear leaves 150–240 mm (5.9–9.4 in) long and 1–2 mm (0.039–0.079 in) wide and deeply grooved with tiny hairs on the edges. The flowering scape is 40–200 mm (1.6–7.9 in) long and glabrous and the sheath enclosing the flowers is lance-shaped, glabrous, chocolate brown and 25–35 mm (0.98–1.38 in) long. The outer tepals are violet, broadly egg-shaped with the narrower end towards the base, 12–20 mm (0.47–0.79 in) long and 10–15 mm (0.39–0.59 in) wide, the hypanthium tube about 25 mm (0.98 in) long and glabrous. Flowering occurs from September to November and the fruit is a capsule 20–25 mm (0.79–0.98 in) long containing dark brown seeds.

== Taxonomy ==
This species was first formally described in 1869 by Ferdinand von Mueller who gave it the name Genosiris maxwellii in Fragmenta Phytographiae Australiae from specimens collected by George Maxwell from Stokes's Inlet to McCallum's Inlet. In 1873, George Bentham changed the name to Patersonia maxwellii. The specific epithet (maxwellii) commemorates George Maxwell.

== Distribution and habitat ==
Patersonia maxwellii grows in heath and seasonally wet places in near-coastal areas between Albany and Israelite Bay and on the southern Darling Range in the Jarrah Forest and Esperance Plains biogeographic regions in southern Western Australia.

== Conservation status ==
This patersonia is listed as "not threatened" by the Government of Western Australia Department of Biodiversity, Conservation and Attractions.
