= Patersonia argyrea =

Conservation status
- Priority Three — Poorly Known Taxa (DEC)

Scientific classification
- Kingdom: Plantae
- Clade: Tracheophytes
- Clade: Angiosperms
- Clade: Monocots
- Order: Asparagales
- Family: Iridaceae
- Genus: Patersonia
- Species: P. argyrea

Binomial name
- Patersonia argyrea D.A.Cooke

Species of flowering plant

Patersonia argyrea is a species of plant in the iris family Iridaceae and is endemic to Western Australia. It is a tufted perennial herb with linear, sword-shaped leaves and violet tepals.

== Description ==
Patersonia argyrea is a tufted perennial herb that typically grows to a height of 40 cm (16 in) with its foliage covered with silvery hairs. It has six to ten linear, sword-shaped, grass-like leaves 60–100 mm (2.4–3.9 in) long and 2.0–5.2 mm (0.079–0.205 in) wide. The flowering scape is shorter than the leaves, 21–35 cm (8.3–13.8 in) long with the sheath enclosing the flowers elliptic, dark brown, prominently veined and 35–52 mm (1.4–2.0 in) long. The outer tepals are violet-purple, the hypanthium tube 20–35 mm (0.79–1.38 in) long and glabrous. Flowering mainly occurs from September to November.

== Taxonomy and naming ==
Patersonia argyrea was first described in 1984 by David Alan Cooke in the journal Nuytsia, from specimens collected by Charles Austin Gardner on Mount Lesueur in 1946. The specific epithet (argyrea) is derived from the Latin word argyreus meaning "silvery", referring to the hairs on the foliage.

== Distribution and habitat ==
This patersonia grows in heath on sandy soil and is only known from near Mount Lesueur in the Geraldton Sandplains Biogeographic region of south-western Western Australia.

== Conservation status ==
Patersonia argyrea is listed as "Priority Three" by the Government of Western Australia Department of Biodiversity, Conservation and Attractions, meaning that it is poorly known and known from only a few locations but is not under imminent threat.
