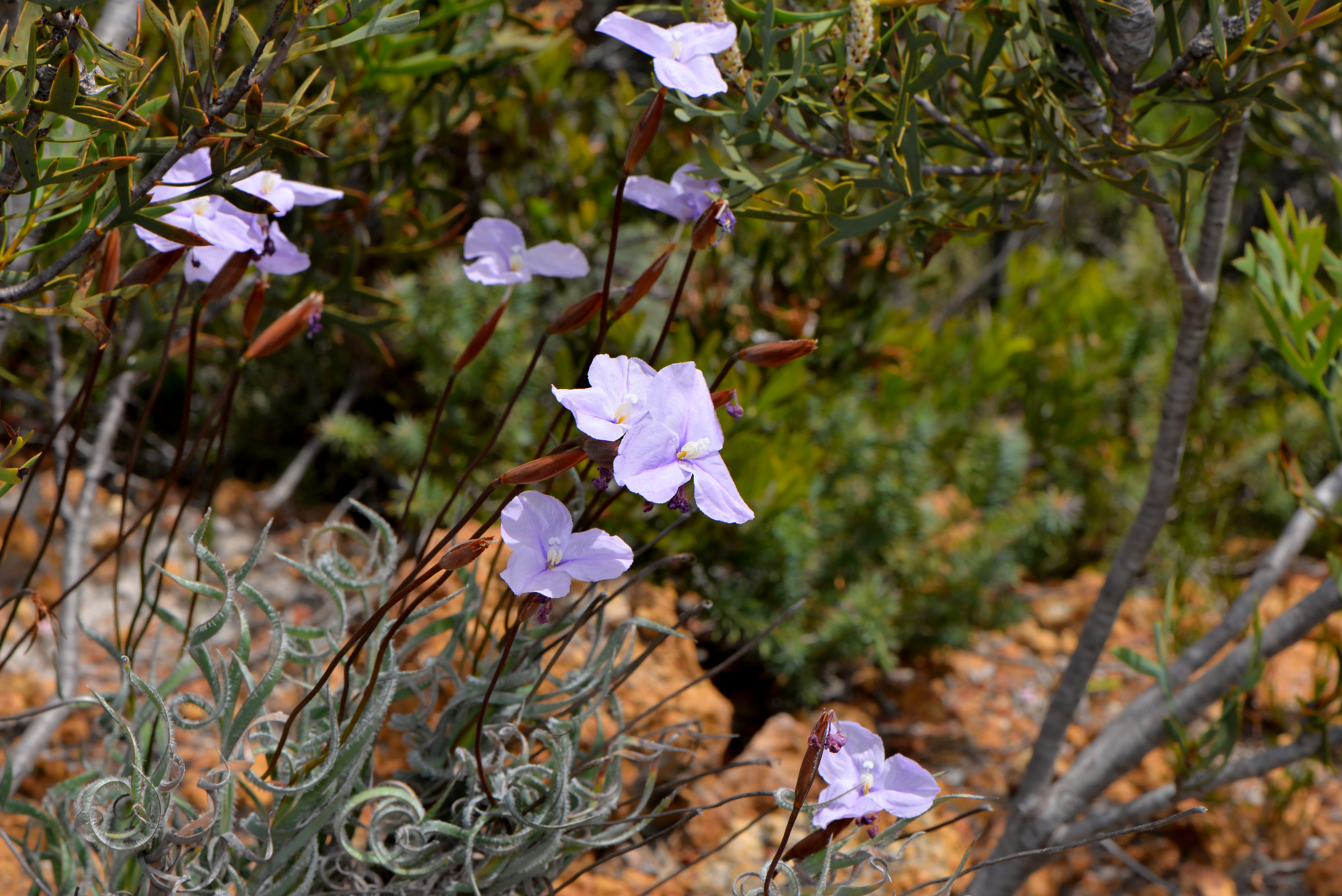

Conservation status
- Endangered (EPBC Act)

Scientific classification
- Kingdom: Plantae
- Clade: Tracheophytes
- Clade: Angiosperms
- Clade: Monocots
- Order: Asparagales
- Family: Iridaceae
- Genus: Patersonia
- Species: P. spirafolia

Binomial name
- Patersonia spirafolia Keighery

= Patersonia spirafolia =

Species of flowering plant

Patersonia spirafolia (common name - spiral-leaved Patersonia) is a species of plant in the iris family Iridaceae and is endemic to Western Australia.

It was first described by Gregory John Keighery in 1990. There are no synonyms.

== Gallery ==
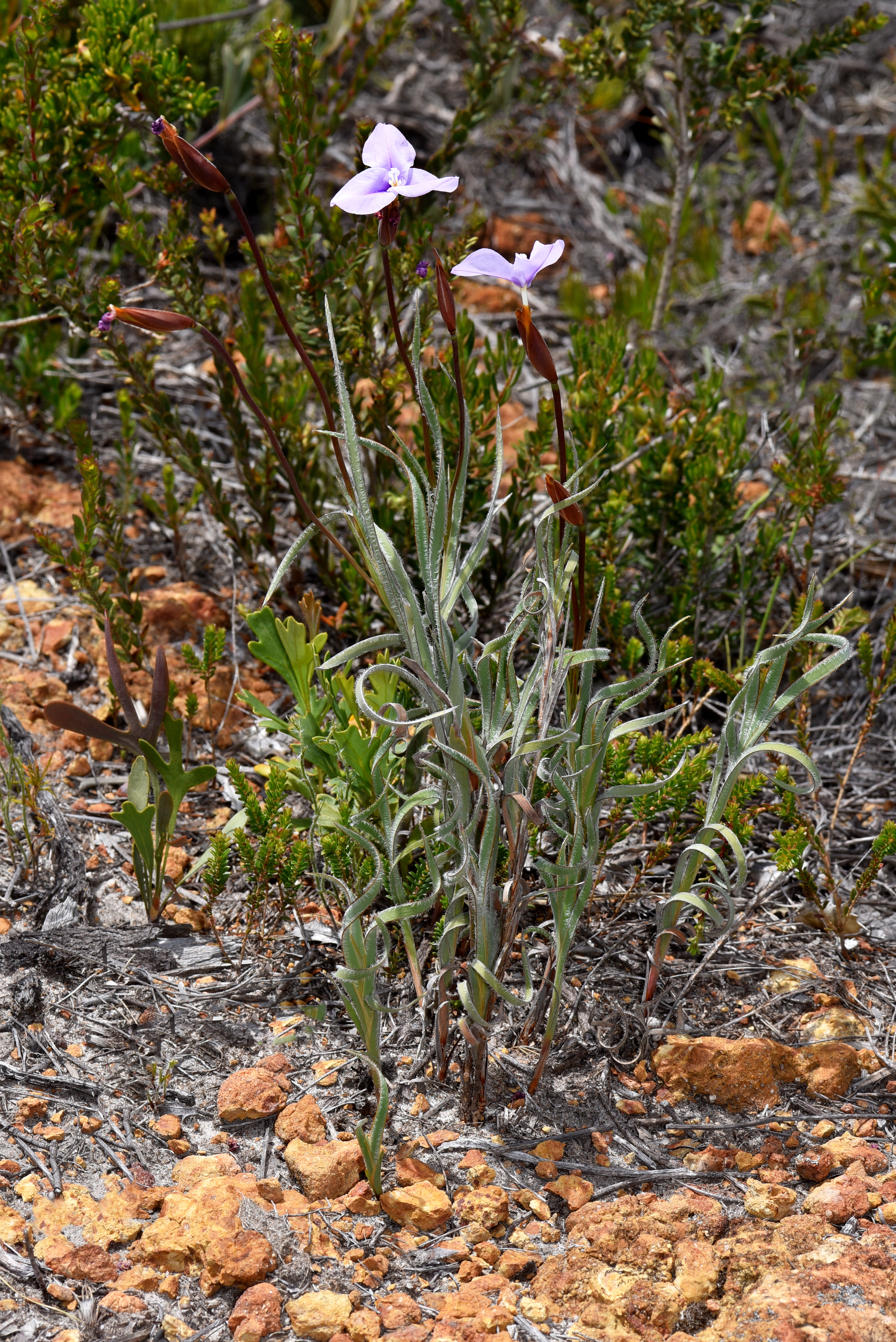

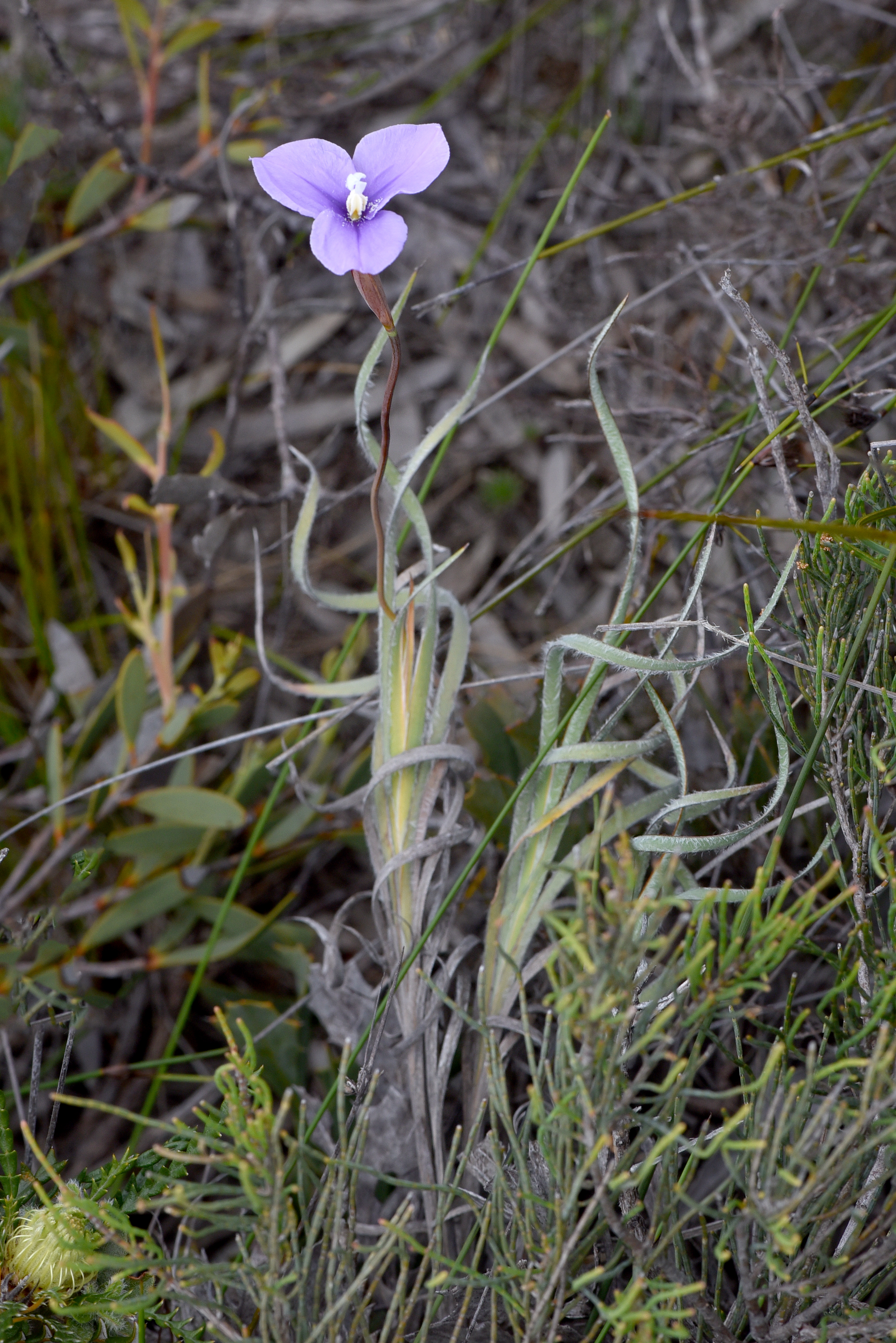

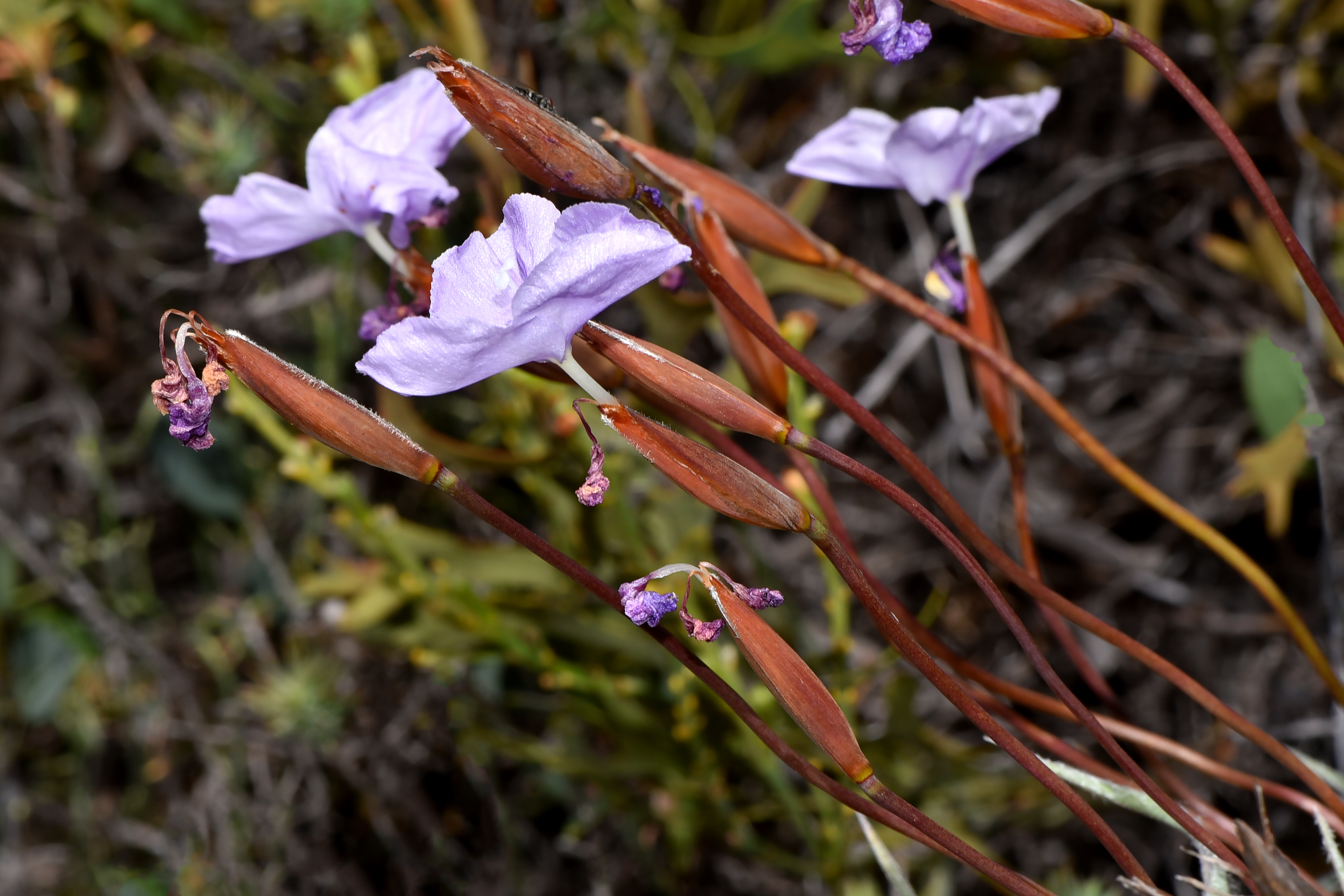

== Description ==
Patersonia spirafolia is a perennial herb which grows to 50 cm high in tussocks up to 40 cm wide. It has a woody rootstock. The leaves are linear (20 cm by 5 mm) and spirally twisted. The leaf margins are fringed with soft hairs pointing towards the centre of the leaf. The reddish-green scape is up to 25 cm long, 1-2 mm wide. The structure which envelops the flower cluster is brown. The flowers have three broad, mauve sepals and three very small, upright, blue-violet petals.

It is found to the south west of Badgingarra, growing on sand over laterite.
