= Patersonia rudis =

Hairy flag

Scientific classification
- Kingdom: Plantae
- Clade: Tracheophytes
- Clade: Angiosperms
- Clade: Monocots
- Order: Asparagales
- Family: Iridaceae
- Genus: Patersonia
- Species: P. rudis

Binomial name
- Patersonia rudis Endl.

Synonyms
- Genosiris pygmaea (Endl.) F.Muell.; Patersonia sericea var. rudis (Endl.) Geerinck

Species of flowering plant

Patersonia rudis, commonly known as hairy flag, is a species of plant in the iris family Iridaceae and is endemic to the south-west of Western Australia. It is a tufted, rhizome-forming perennial herb with linear to sword-shaped leaves and violet tepals.

== Description ==
Patersonia rudis is a tufted perennial herb that typically grows to a height of 40 cm (16 in) and forms a rhizome covered by sticky leaf bases. Its leaves are linear to sword-shaped and 200–700 mm (7.9–27.6 in) long, striated and softly-hairy near the base. The flowering scape is 200–500 mm (7.9–19.7 in) long and velvety with the sheath enclosing the flowers lance-shaped, blackish, prominently veined and 30–63 mm (1.2–2.5 in) long. The outer tepals are violet, egg-shaped with the narrower end towards the base, 25–35 mm (0.98–1.38 in) long and 20–30 mm (0.79–1.18 in) wide, the hypanthium tube 20–30 mm (0.79–1.18 in) long and softly-hairy. Flowering occurs from October to December and the fruit is an oval capsule 20–30 mm (0.79–1.18 in) long, containing black seeds.

== Taxonomy and naming ==
Patersonia rudis was first described in 1846 by Stephan Endlicher in Lehmann's Plantae Preissianae. The specific epithet (rudis) means "rough" or "wild".

In 1986, David Alan Cooke and Alex George described two subspecies in the Flora of Australia and the names are accepted by the Australian Plant Census:

- Petersonia rudis Endl. subsp. rudis has leaves more than 300 mm (12 in) long and 3–7 mm (0.12–0.28 in) wide, and a flowering sheath that often becomes more or less glabrous as it ages;
- Petersonia rudis subsp. velutina D.A.Cooke has shorter, narrower leaves than the autonym and the sheath is never glabrous.

== Distribution and habitat ==
Subspecies rudis grows in woodland and forest on the Darling Range between New Norcia and Dwellingup in the Jarrah Forest and Swan Coastal Plain biogeographic regions of south-western Western Australia but subspecies velutina grows in more arid woodland and shrubland further east near Southern Cross and Coolgardie in the Avon Wheatbelt and Coolgardie bioregions.

== Conservation status ==
Both subspecies of P. rudis are classified as "not threatened" by the Western Australian Government Department of Biodiversity, Conservation and Attractions.
