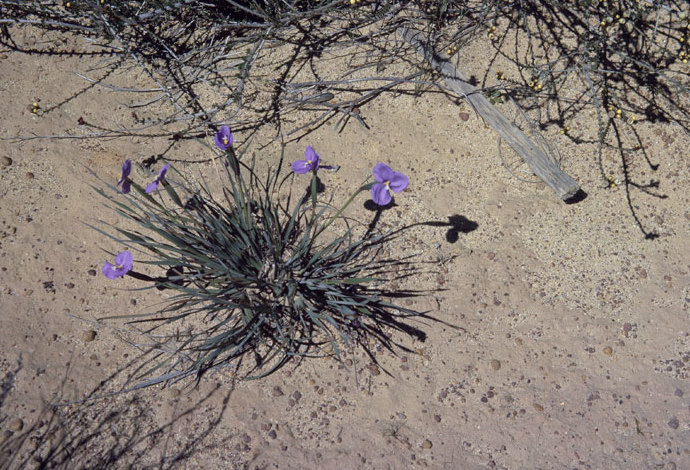
- Patersonia drummondii near Dowerin

Scientific classification
- Kingdom: Plantae
- Clade: Tracheophytes
- Clade: Angiosperms
- Clade: Monocots
- Order: Asparagales
- Family: Iridaceae
- Genus: Patersonia
- Species: P. drummondii

Binomial name
- Patersonia drummondii F.Muell. ex Benth.

Synonyms
- Genosiris drummondii (Benth.) Kuntze

= Patersonia drummondii =

Drummond's patersonia

Species of flowering plant

Patersonia drummondii, commonly known as Drummond's patersonia, is a species of plant in the iris family Iridaceae and is endemic to the south-west of Western Australia. It is a tufted herb with linear, often twisted leaves and pale violet to purple or blue tepals.

== Description ==
Patersonia drummondii is a tufted herb with linear, often twisted leaves 100–300 mm (3.9–11.8 in) long, 1.5–4 mm (0.059–0.157 in) wide and grooved. The flowering scape is up to 270 mm (11 in) long clasped by a single, small leaf and the sheath enclosing the flowers is lance-shaped, glabrous, green and 32–60 mm (1.3–2.4 in) long. The outer tepals are pale violet to purple or blue, 15–24 mm (0.59–0.94 in) long and 12–20 mm (0.47–0.79 in) wide, and the hypanthium tube is 30–45 mm (1.2–1.8 in) long. Flowering occurs from August to October.

== Taxonomy and naming ==
Patersonia drummondii was first described in 1873 by George Bentham in Flora Australiensis from an unpublished description by Ferdinand von Mueller, from specimens collected by James Drummond in the Swan River Colony. The specific epithet (drummondii) honours James Drummond.

== Distribution and habitat ==
This patersonia grows in heathland and mallee south from the Murchison River and inland as far as Southern Cross in the Avon Wheatbelt, Coolgardie, Geraldton Sandplains, Jarrah Forest, Mallee, Swan Coastal Plain and Yagoo biogeographic regions of south-western Western Australia.

== Conservation status ==
Patersonia drummondii is listed as "not threatened" by the Government of Western Australia Department of Biodiversity, Conservation and Attractions.
