= Patersonia limbata =

Scientific classification
- Kingdom: Plantae
- Clade: Tracheophytes
- Clade: Angiosperms
- Clade: Monocots
- Order: Asparagales
- Family: Iridaceae
- Genus: Patersonia
- Species: P. limbata

Binomial name
- Patersonia limbata Endl.

Synonyms
- Genosiris limbata (Endl.) Kuntze; Genosiris occidentalis var. eriostephana F.Muell.; Patersonia occidentalis var. eriostephana (F.Muell.) Domin

Species of flowering plant

Patersonia limbata is a species of plant in the iris family Iridaceae and is endemic to the south of Western Australia. It is a tufted, rhizome-forming herb with sword-shaped, bordered leaves and violet tepals.

== Description ==
Patersonia limbata is a tufted perennial herb that forms a rhizome and has glabrous, sword-shaped leaves 180–400 mm (7.1–15.7 in) long and 4–11 mm (0.16–0.43 in) wide with a thickened border about 1 mm (0.039 in) wide. The flowering scape is 270–380 mm (11–15 in) long and glabrous with two short, pale-coloured leaves. The outer tepals are violet, egg-shaped to round, up to 30 mm (1.2 in) long and 25 mm (0.98 in) wide, the hypanthium tube about 35 mm (1.4 in) long and glabrous. Flowering occurs from September to October.

== Taxonomy and naming ==
Patersonia limbata was first described in 1846 by Stephan Endlicher in Lehmann's Plantae Preissianae from specimens collected near Albany in 1840. The specific epithet (limbata) means "having a border".

== Distribution and habitat ==
This patersonia grows in heath, scrub and woodland in scattered locations on the southern Darling Range and in near-coastal areas from Albany to the Cape Arid National Park.

== Conservation status ==
Patersonia limbata is classified as "not threatened" by the Western Australian Government Department of Biodiversity, Conservation and Attractions.
