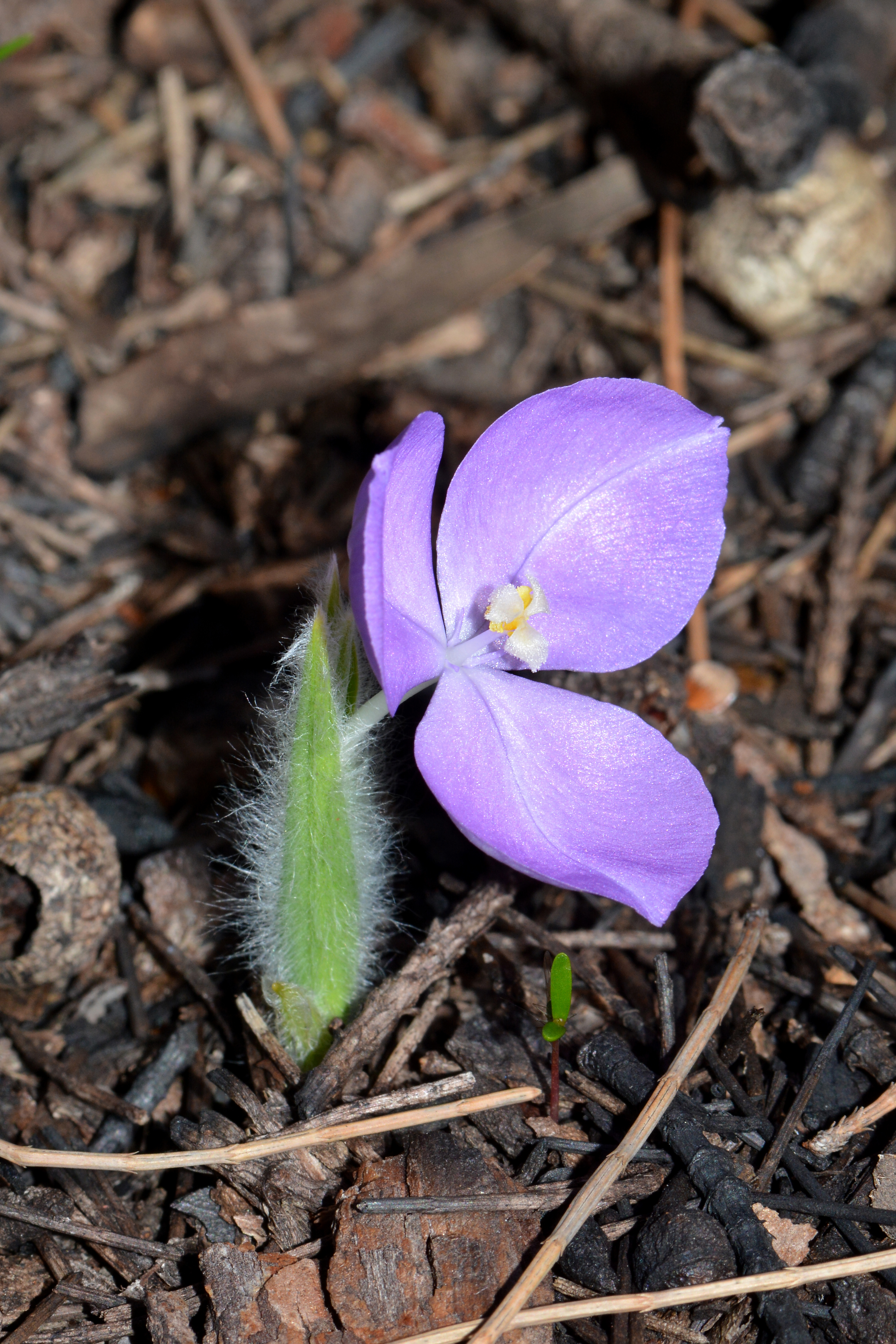

Scientific classification
- Kingdom: Plantae
- Clade: Tracheophytes
- Clade: Angiosperms
- Clade: Monocots
- Order: Asparagales
- Family: Iridaceae
- Genus: Patersonia
- Species: P. babianoides

Binomial name
- Patersonia babianoides Benth.

Synonyms
- Genosiris babianodes Kuntz orth. var.; Genosiris babianoides (Benth.) Kuntze

= Patersonia babianoides =

Species of flowering plant

Patersonia babianoides is a species of plant in the iris family Iridaceae and is endemic to the south-west of Western Australia. It is a tufted, rhizome-forming herb with soft, linear to elliptic leaves and blue-violet tepals on a relatively short flowering scape.

== Description ==
Patersonia babianoides is a tufted, rhizome-forming herb that typically grows to a height of 2–40 cm (0.79–15.75 in) and annually forms corm-like segments. Each segment usually only has a single linear to elliptic leaf 70–160 mm (2.8–6.3 in) long and 5–12 mm (0.20–0.47 in) wide on a petiole 30–50 mm (1.2–2.0 in) long, and covered with soft hairs 3–6 mm (0.12–0.24 in) long. The flowering scape is 20–30 mm (0.79–1.18 in) long with the sheath enclosing the flowers narrow triangular to lance-shaped, prominently veined, green, hairy and 20–34 mm (0.79–1.34 in) long. The outer tepals are blue-purple, 15–20 mm (0.59–0.79 in) long and 12–14 mm (0.47–0.55 in) wide, and the hypanthium tube is 15–20 mm (0.59–0.79 in) long and glabrous. Flowering mainly occurs from September to November.

== Taxonomy and naming ==
Patersonia babianoides was first described in 1873 by George Bentham in Flora Australiensis, from specimens collected by James Drummond in the Swan River Colony. The specific epithet (babianoides) means "Babiana-like".

== Distribution and habitat ==
This patersonia is common in the Darling Range, mostly between the Helena Valley and Collie where it grows in jarrah forest in the Jarrah Forest and Warren biogeographic regions of south-western Western Australia.

== Conservation status ==
Patersonia babianoides is listed as "not threatened" by the Government of Western Australia Department of Biodiversity, Conservation and Attractions.
