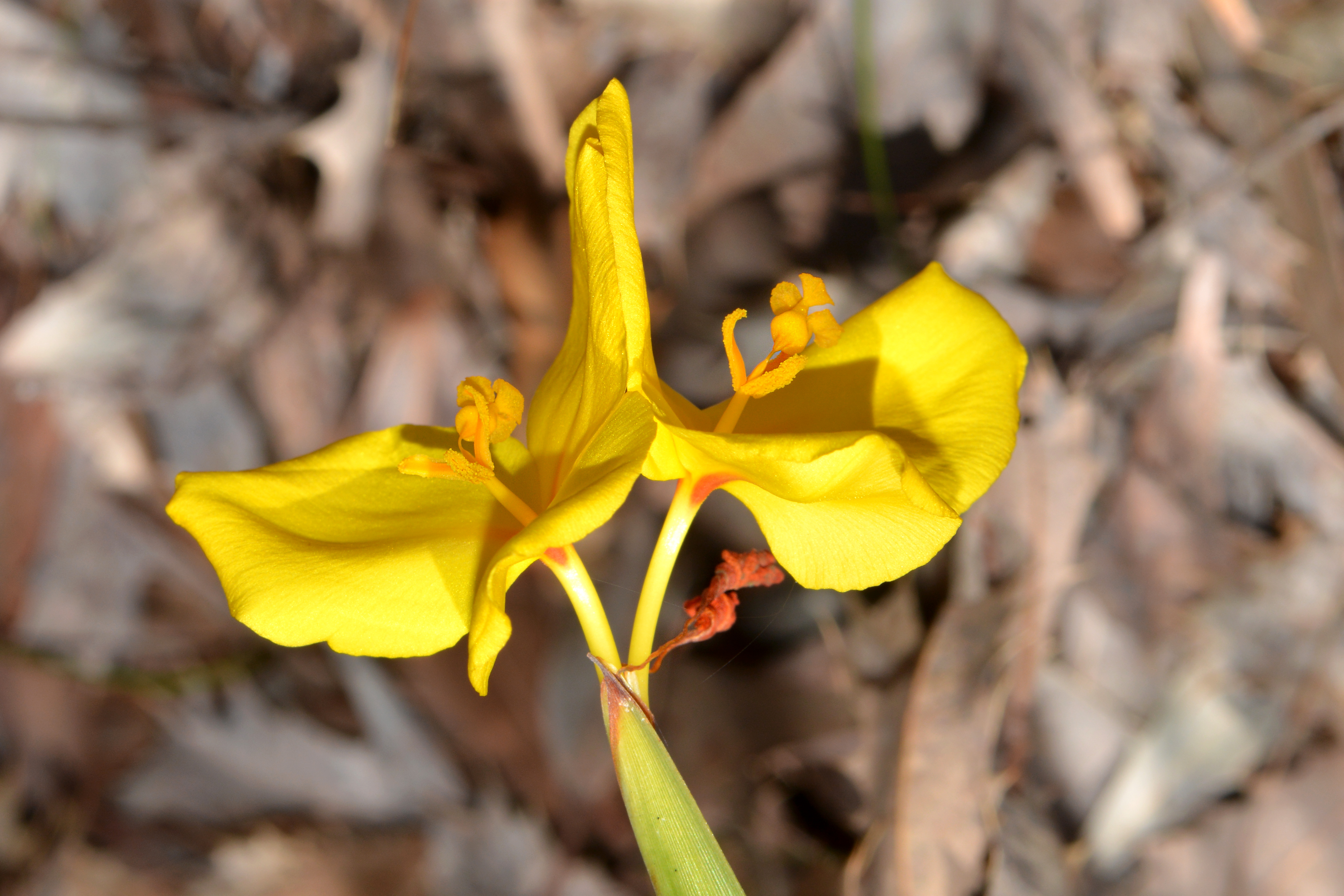
- Patersonia umbrosa var. xanthina

Scientific classification
- Kingdom: Plantae
- Clade: Tracheophytes
- Clade: Angiosperms
- Clade: Monocots
- Order: Asparagales
- Family: Iridaceae
- Genus: Patersonia
- Species: P. umbrosa

Binomial name
- Patersonia umbrosa Endl.

Synonyms
- Genosiris umbrosa (Endl.) F.Muell.

= Patersonia umbrosa =

Yellow flags

Species of flowering plant

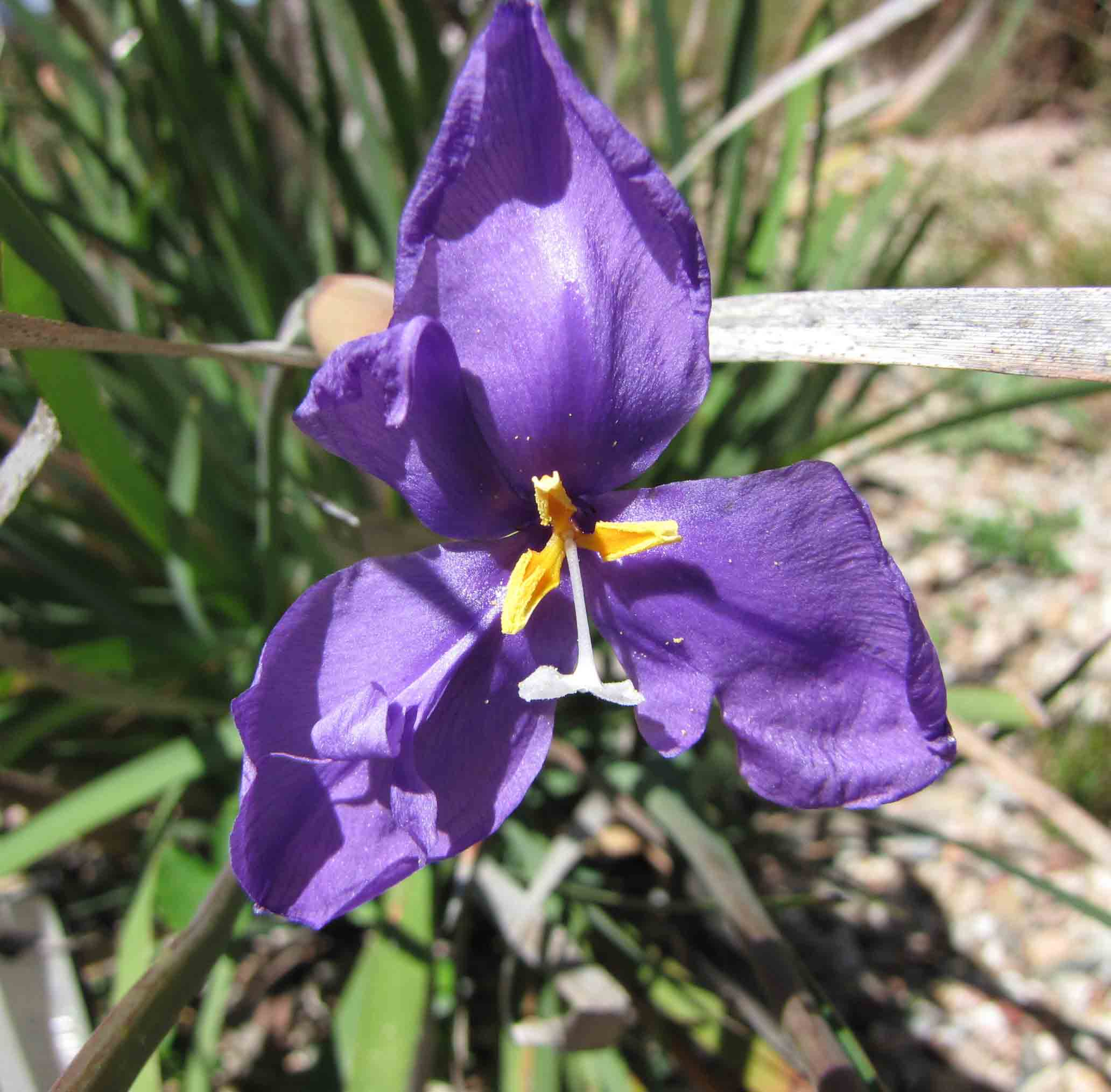
Var. umbrosa in the ANBG

Patersonia umbrosa, commonly known as yellow flags, is a species of plant in the iris family Iridaceae and is endemic to the south-west of Western Australia. It is a loosely-tufted, rhizome-forming, perennial herb with linear to sword-shaped leaves and deep bluish-violet or bright yellow tepals.

== Description ==
Patersonia umbrosa is a loosely-tufted perennial herb with linear to sword-shaped leaves 300–900 mm (12–35 in) long and 4–6 mm (0.16–0.24 in) wide. The flowering scape is 300–800 mm (12–31 in) long and glabrous with the sheath enclosing the flowers narrowly lance-shaped, green, prominently veined and 60–85 mm (2.4–3.3 in) long. The outer tepals are deep bluish violet or bright yellow depending on variety, and egg-shaped to rhombic, 25–35 mm (0.98–1.38 in) long and 20–25 mm (0.79–0.98 in) wide, the hypanthium tube about 50 mm (2.0 in) long.

== Taxonomy and naming ==
Patersonia umbrosa was first described in 1846 by Stephan Endlicher in Lehmann's Plantae Preissianae. The specific epithet (umbrosa) means "growing in the shade".

In 1912, Karel Domin described two varieties in the Journal of the Linnean Society, Botany and the names are accepted by the Australian Plant Census:

- Petersonia umbrosa Endl. var. umbrosa had deep bluish-violet flowers from August to November;
- Petersonia umbrosa var. xanthina (Oldfield & F.Muell. ex F.Muell.) Domin, previously known as Patersonia xanthina, has bright yellow flowers from August to October.

== Distribution and habitat ==
Variety umbrosa grows in scrub, woodland and forest in poorly-drained soil between the Deep River, the Stirling Range and the Fitzgerald River in the Esperance Plains, Jarrah Forest and Warren biogeographic regions. Variety xanthina grows in forest from the southern Darling Range to the Deep River in the Jarrah Forest, Swan Coastal Plain and Warren biogeographic regions of south-western Western Australia.

== Conservation status ==
Both varieties of P. umbrosa are classified as "not threatened" by the Western Australian Government Department of Biodiversity, Conservation and Attractions.
