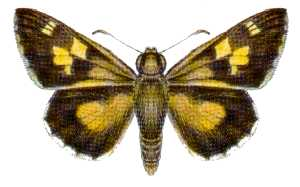

Scientific classification
- Kingdom: Animalia
- Phylum: Arthropoda
- Clade: Pancrustacea
- Class: Insecta
- Order: Lepidoptera
- Family: Hesperiidae
- Genus: Mesodina
- Species: M. aeluropis

Binomial name
- Mesodina aeluropis Meyrick, 1901

= Mesodina aeluropis =

Species of butterfly

Mesodina aeluropis, the aeluropis skipper or montane iris skipper, is a butterfly of the family Hesperiidae. It is endemic to New South Wales, Australia.

The wingspan is about 30 mm.

The larvae feed on Patersonia sericea.
