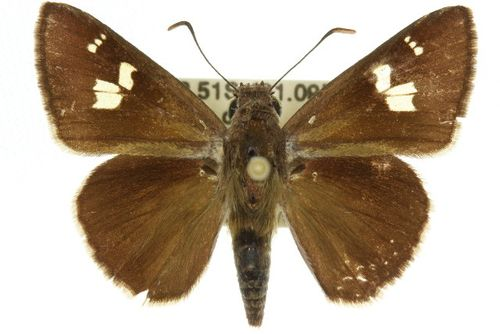

Scientific classification
- Kingdom: Animalia
- Phylum: Arthropoda
- Class: Insecta
- Order: Lepidoptera
- Family: Hesperiidae
- Genus: Mesodina
- Species: M. gracillima

Binomial name
- Mesodina gracillima E.D. Edwards, 1987

= Mesodina gracillima =

Species of butterfly

Mesodina gracillima, the northern iris-skipper, is a butterfly of the family Hesperiidae. It is endemic to the northern coast of Australia's Northern Territory.

The wingspan is about 30 mm.
