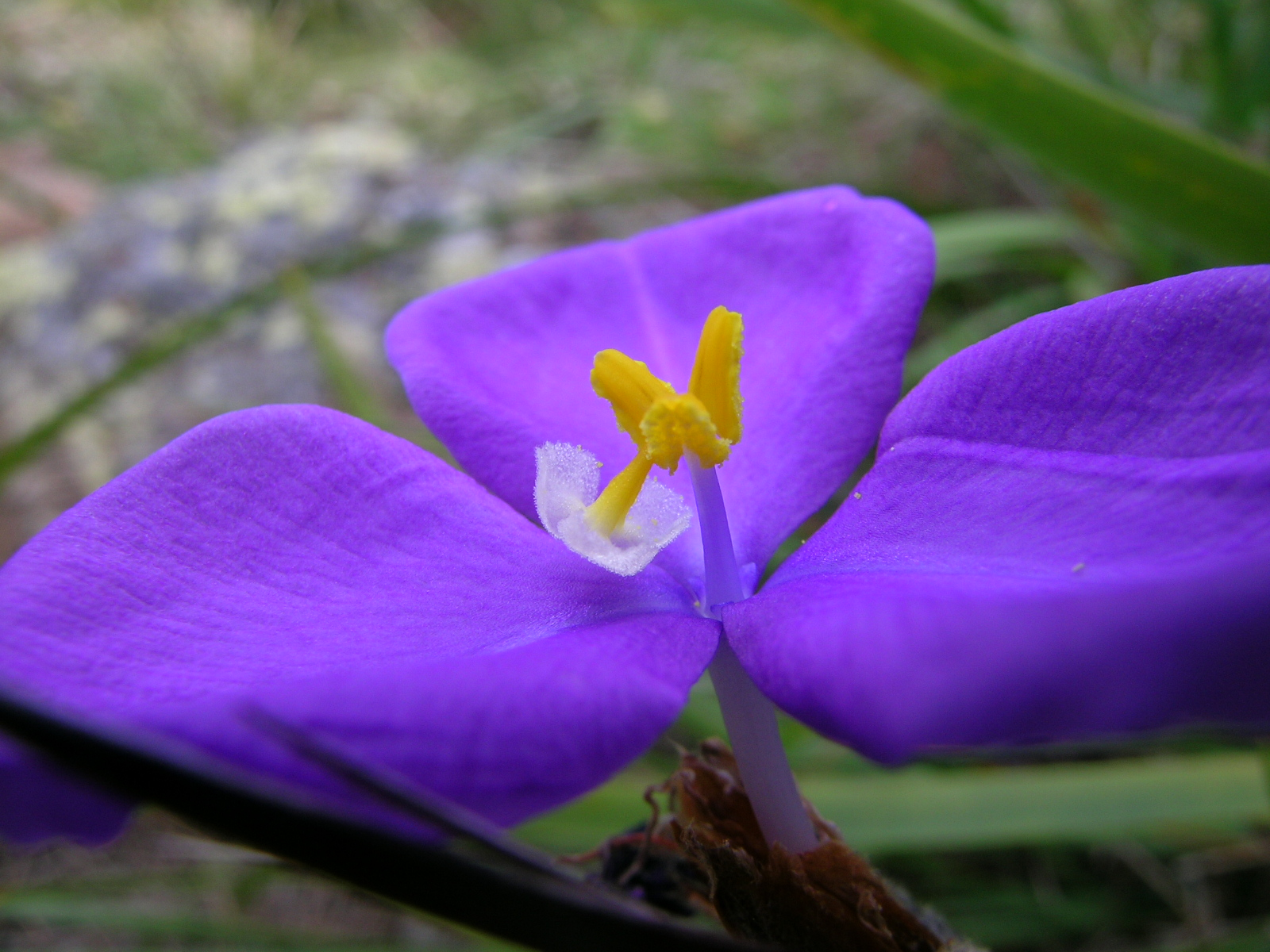

Scientific classification
- Kingdom: Plantae
- Clade: Embryophytes
- Clade: Tracheophytes
- Clade: Spermatophytes
- Clade: Angiosperms
- Clade: Monocots
- Order: Asparagales
- Family: Iridaceae
- Genus: Patersonia
- Species: P. sericea

Binomial name
- Patersonia sericea R.Br.

Synonyms
- Genosiris sericea (R.Br.) F.Muell.; Patersonia subalpina F.Muell.

= Patersonia sericea =

Purple flag

Species of flowering plant

Patersonia sericea, commonly known as purple flag or silky purple-flag is a species of plant in the iris family Iridaceae and is endemic to eastern Australia. It is a densely-tufted perennial herb with linear, sword-shaped leaves, broadly egg-shaped, bluish-violet tepals and an oval capsule.

== Description ==
The purple flag is a densely-tufted perennial herb growing to a height of up to 60 cm (24 in). It has linear, sword-shaped, grass-like green leaves 120–600 mm (4.7–23.6 in) long and 1–6 mm (0.039–0.236 in) wide. The flowering scape is 3–55 cm (1.2–21.7 in) long with the sheath enclosing the flowers egg-shaped to lance-shaped, dark brown to blackish, prominently veined and 20–60 mm (0.79–2.36 in) long. The outer tepals are bluish-violet, 20–30 mm (0.79–1.18 in) long and 15–25 mm (0.59–0.98 in) wide, the inner tepals about 2 mm (0.079 in) long and the stamen filaments 4–6 mm (0.16–0.24 in) long and joined for part of their length. Flowering mainly occurs from June to November, each flower open for one day, but each stem producing many flowers. The fruit is an oval capsule 15–25 mm (0.59–0.98 in) long.

== Taxonomy and naming ==
Patersonia sericea was first described in 1807 by Robert Brown in Curtis's Botanical Magazine, from specimens "...furnished us by Messrs. Lee and Kennedy, of Hammersmith, West London who received the seeds, from which they raised it, from Port Jackson". The specific epithet (sericea) is derived from the Latin word sericus meaning "silken", referring to the hairs at the base of the juvenile leaves.

The names of two varieties of P. sericea are accepted by the Australian Plant Census:

- Patersonia sericea var. longifolia (R.Br.) C.Moore has leaves 1–2 mm (0.039–0.079 in) wide and mostly smooth with hairs on the edges turned inwards against the surface;
- Patersonia sericea R.Br. var. sericea has leaves 1.5–6 mm (0.059–0.236 in) wide, the edges lacking the reflexed hairs of var. longifolia.

Patersonia longifolia was described in 1810 by Robert Brown in his Prodromus Florae Novae Hollandiae et Insulae Van Diemen but reduced to a variety in 1893 by Charles Moore in the Handbook of the Flora of New South Wales.

== Distribution and habitat ==
Purple flag (var. longifolia) grows in open forest and heath on the coast and ranges on soils derived from sandstone, from the Hunter River in New South Wales to the Genoa River in far north-eastern Victoria.

Silky purple-flag (var. sericea) is found in forest, woodland and heath on the coast and tablelands, and grows on soils derived from sandstone or granite, in south-eastern Queensland, eastern New South Wales and eastern Victoria.

== Conservation ==
Patersonia sericea is not considered to be at risk in the wild.

== Use in horticulture ==
It is a reliable species in cultivation, thriving in hot, dry situations and is also frost tolerant. It is useful grown en masse in a bed of perennial plants.

== Ecology ==
Patersonia sericea is used as larval food by two species of butterfly, the eastern iris-skipper (Mesodina halyzia) and montane iris-skipper (Mesodina aeluropis).
