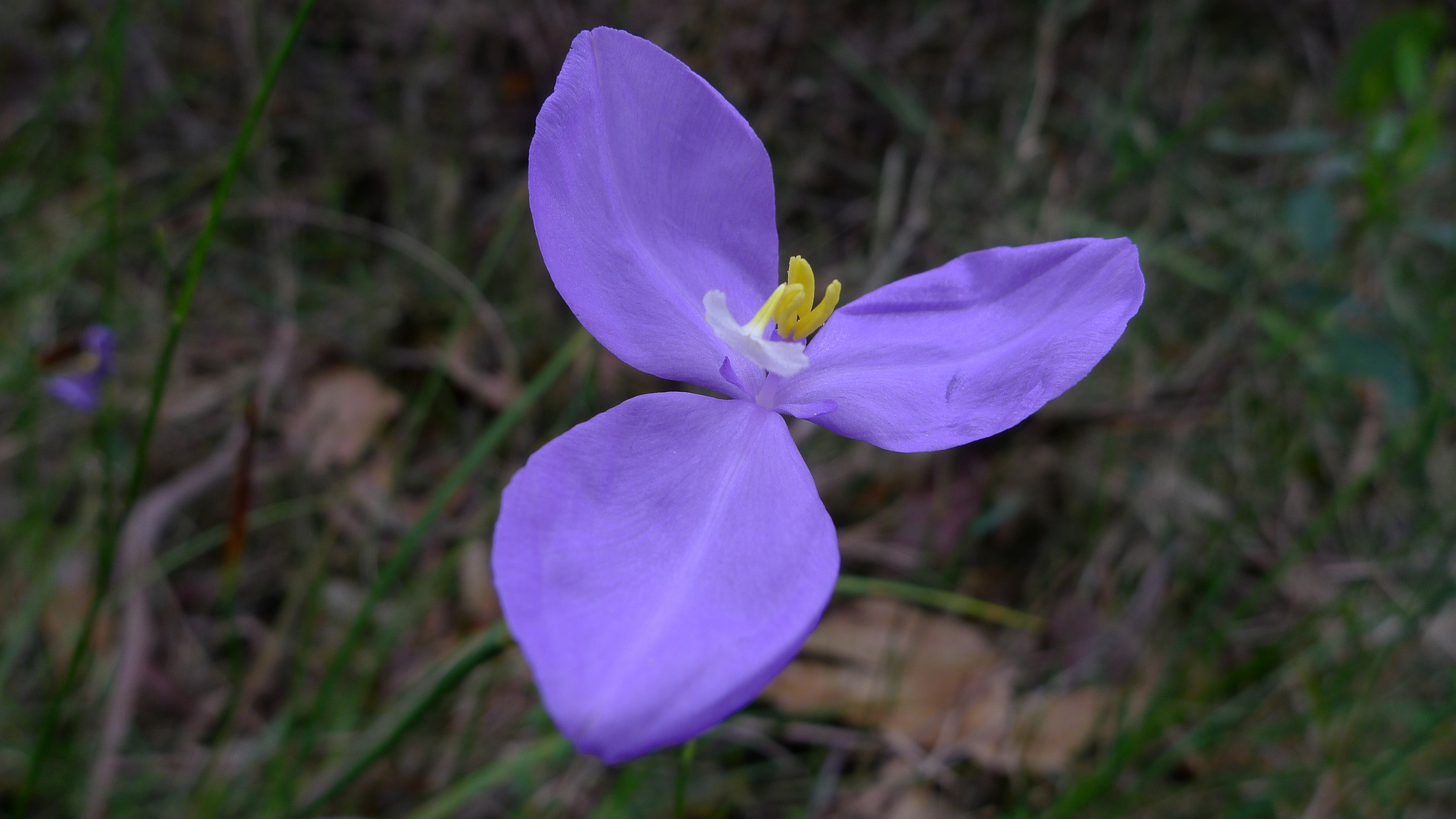
- In the Royal National Park

Scientific classification
- Kingdom: Plantae
- Clade: Tracheophytes
- Clade: Angiosperms
- Clade: Monocots
- Order: Asparagales
- Family: Iridaceae
- Genus: Patersonia
- Species: P. glabrata

Binomial name
- Patersonia glabrata R.Br.

Synonyms
- Genosiris glabrata (R.Br.) F.Muell.; Patersonia media R.Br.

= Patersonia glabrata =

Leafy purple-flag

Species of plant in the family Iridaceae

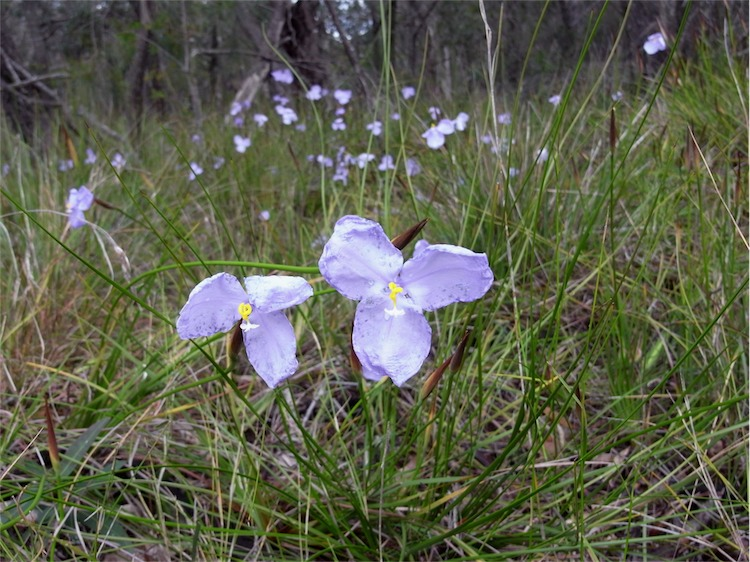
Habit near Gosford

Patersonia glabrata, commonly known as leafy purple-flag, or bugulbi in the Cadigal language, is a species of flowering plant in the family Iridaceae and is endemic to eastern Australia. It is a perennial herb or subshrub with linear leaves and pale violet flowers.

== Description ==
Patersonia glabrata is a perennial herb or subshrub that typically grows to a height of 30–80 cm (12–31 in) with a few woody stems. The leaves are linear, 100–400 mm (3.9–15.7 in) long, 2–4 mm (0.079–0.157 in) wide and glabrous apart from minute hairs on near the edges of the leaf base. The flowering scape is 100–300 mm (3.9–11.8 in) long and glabrous and the sheath enclosing the flowers is lance-shaped, 40–65 mm (1.6–2.6 in) long and dark brown. The petal-like sepals are pale violet, egg-shaped to more or less round, 20–30 mm (0.79–1.18 in) long and 15–26 mm (0.59–1.02 in) wide and the stamens have filaments 5–7 mm (0.20–0.28 in) long joined for most of their length. Flowering occurs from August to October and the fruit is a cylindrical capsule 20–40 mm (0.79–1.57 in) long containing seeds about 4 mm (0.16 in) long.

== Taxonomy ==
Patersonia glabrata was first formally described in 1810 by Robert Brown in his Prodromus Florae Novae Hollandiae et Insulae Van Diemen. The specific epithet (glabrata) means "nearly glabrous".

== Distribution and habitat ==
Leafy purple-flag grows on the coast and tablelands of eastern Australia from 18°South in Queensland through New South Wales to Bairnsdale in Victoria with disjunct populations on Wilsons Promontory and French Island. It is found in forest, woodland and coastal heath.
