= Patersonia juncea =

Rush leaved patersonia

Scientific classification
- Kingdom: Plantae
- Clade: Tracheophytes
- Clade: Angiosperms
- Clade: Monocots
- Order: Asparagales
- Family: Iridaceae
- Genus: Patersonia
- Species: P. juncea

Binomial name
- Patersonia juncea Lindl.

Synonyms
- Genosiris juncea (Lindl.) F.Muell.; Patersonia juncea var. elongata Benth.; Patersonia juncea Lindl. var. juncea

Species of flowering plant

Patersonia juncea, commonly known as rush leaved patersonia, is a species of plant in the iris family Iridaceae and is endemic to a restricted part of the south-west of Western Australia. It is a tufted perennial herb with linear leaves and pale violet tepals.

== Description ==
Patersonia juncea is a tufted perennial herb that grows to a height of 7–30 cm (2.8–11.8 in) and forms a rhizome. The leaves are linear, 70–220 mm (2.8–8.7 in) long, 0.6–1.4 mm (0.024–0.055 in) wide and more or less cylindrical with a deep longitudinal groove. The flowering scape is 50–240 mm (2.0–9.4 in) long and glabrous. The outer tepals are pale violet, 15–20 mm (0.59–0.79 in) long and 13–18 mm (0.51–0.71 in) wide, and the hypanthium tube is 25–35 mm (0.98–1.38 in) long and glabrous. Flowering mainly occurs from August to October.

== Taxonomy and naming ==
Patersonia juncea was first described in 1840 by John Lindley in A Sketch of the Vegetation of the Swan River Colony. The specific epithet (juncea) means "rush-like".

== Distribution and habitat ==
Rush leaved patersonia grows in forest, woodland mallee and scrub between Eneabba and Israelite Bay in the Avon Wheatbelt, Esperance Plains, Geraldton Sandplains, Jarrah Forest, Mallee, Swan Coastal Plain and Warren.

== Conservation status ==
Patersonia juncea is classified as "not threatened" by the Western Australian Government Department of Biodiversity, Conservation and Attractions.
