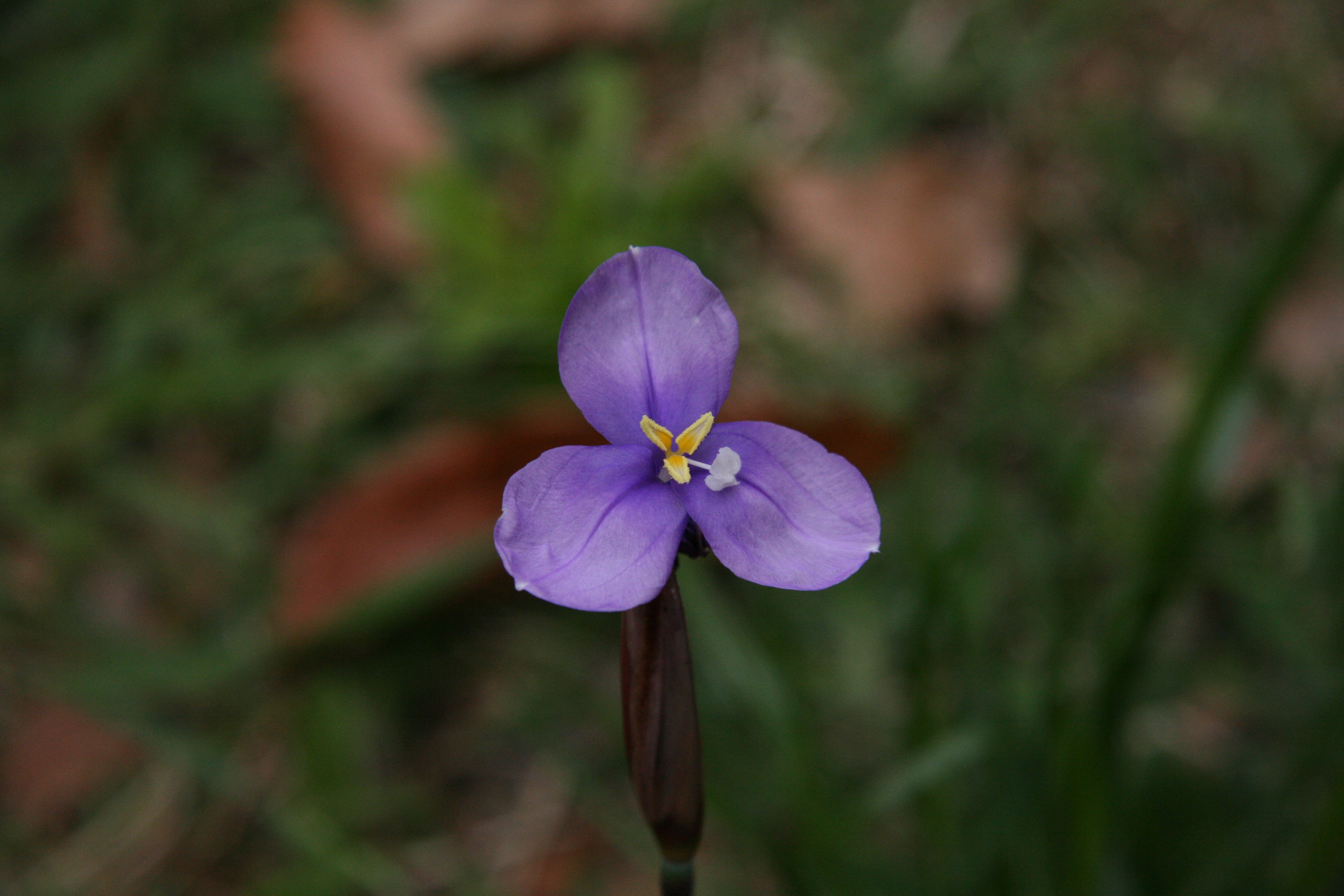

Scientific classification
- Kingdom: Plantae
- Clade: Tracheophytes
- Clade: Angiosperms
- Clade: Monocots
- Order: Asparagales
- Family: Iridaceae
- Genus: Patersonia
- Species: P. fragilis

Binomial name
- Patersonia fragilis (Labill.) Asch. & Graebn.

Synonyms
- Genosiris fragilis Labill.; Patersonia glauca R.Br.

= Patersonia fragilis =

Species of plant in the family Iridaceae

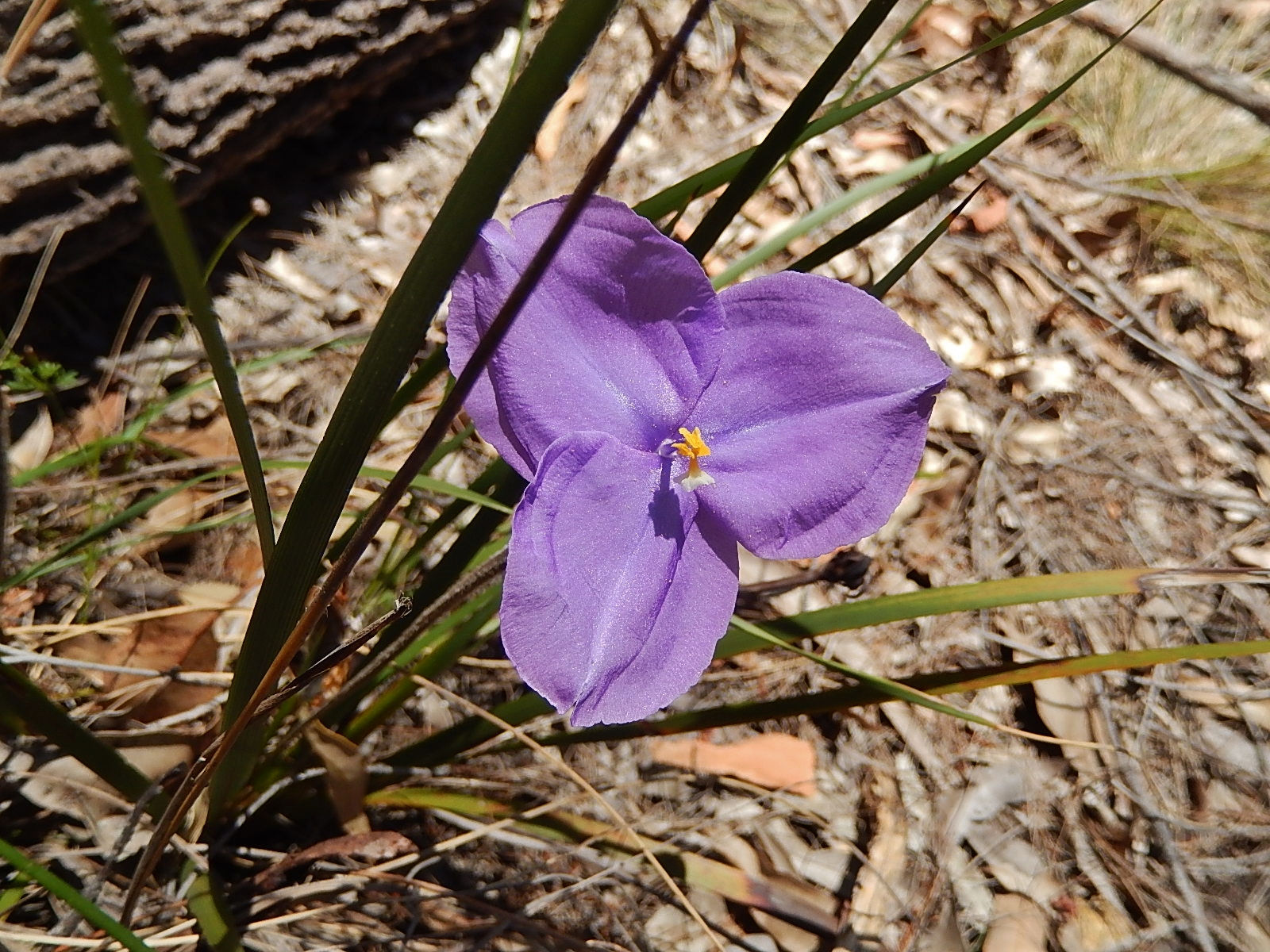
Flower detail

Patersonia fragilis, commonly known as swamp iris or short purple-flag, is a species of flowering plant in the family Iridaceae and is endemic to eastern Australia. It is a tufted perennial herb with linear, cylindrical leaves and pale violet to blue-violet flowers.

== Description ==
Patersonia fragilis is a tufted or clump-forming perennial herb that typically grows to a height of 30–50 cm (12–20 in). There are three to six narrowly linear leaves 220–550 mm (8.7–21.7 in) long and 1–3 mm (0.039–0.118 in) wide on each shoot. The leaves are biconvex to circular in cross-section, glabrous, pale green to glaucous, and often have a sharply-pointed tip.

The flowering scape is 40–250 mm (1.6–9.8 in) long, striated and glabrous, with a smaller leaf clasping its base. The sheath enclosing the flowers is lance-shaped, 25–45 mm (0.98–1.77 in) long, green to pale brown. The petal-like sepals are pale violet to blue-violet, egg-shaped with the narrower end towards the base, 12–23 mm (0.47–0.91 in) long and 10–14 mm (0.39–0.55 in) wide with a thickened midvein and the stamens have filaments 2–3 mm (0.079–0.118 in) long joined for most of their length and the anthers are a similar length. Flowering occurs from August to December and the fruit is a cylindrical capsule 25–30 mm (0.98–1.18 in) long containing black seeds about 2.5 mm (0.098 in) long.

Leaf colour and width and the characteristics of the flowers varies even in the one location. In some coastal areas, the flowering scape may be less than 80 mm (3.1 in) long.

== Taxonomy ==
This species was first formally described in 1805 by Jacques Labillardière who gave it the name Genosiris fragilis in his Novae Hollandiae Plantarum Specimen. In 1906, Paul Ascherson and Paul Graebner changed the name to Patersonia fragilis in their book, Synopsis der Mitteleuropaischen. The specific epithet (fragilis) means "brittle" or "fragile".

== Distribution and habitat ==
Swamp iris is endemic to eastern Australia and occurs from Kangaroo Island in the south-east of South Australia, through southern Victoria, northern and eastern Tasmania, the Southern Tablelands of New South Wales, and south-eastern Queensland. It grows in heath, including wet heathland and wallum heathland.

== Life cycle ==
P. fragilis reproduces through bee pollination. Unlike the zygomorphic yellow flowers, according to the study by Faegri and van der Pijl, purple zygomorphic flowers less commonly attract bees. This problem is highlighted by the unique characteristic of yellow flowers that provides nectar guides, which outline a path for bees to squeeze through to obtain the nectar. Being a flowering plant, P. fragilis follows the same process of pollination and fertilisation in continuation of the life cycle of the plant.

== Ecology ==
Through a recent botanical survey on the Nelson Bay River, a localised community of P. fragilis was found. It is amongst a group of vegetation communities including the Western Wet Scrub and the Eucalyptus nitida Wet Forest. The Patersonia fragilis, however, is in the Wet Heathlands. In this community of flora, it is dominated by the Swamp Heath Sprengelia incarnata that is surviving despite the dry ground. This plant grows to a maximum of 1.5 metres in height and is often surrounded by empty ground where there is a common absence of large shrubs and trees. P. fragilis is amongst other species of plants in wet heathland, and though the diversity of associated species is limited, the community commonly consist of the Leptocarpus tenax, Selaginella uglinosa, Melaleuca squamea and Xyris sp.

== Use in horticulture ==
Patersonia fragilis can be propagated from seed but requires a constantly damp soil similar to its natural habitat. It can survive with either full or light sunshade and can only tolerate dry conditions for less than a week.

== Conservation ==
The wet vegetation communities of Patersonia fragilis may be subject to plant pathogens Phytophthora cinnamomi and myrtle wilt, both naturally occurring in the wetland regions of South Australia. In areas receiving above 600mm of rainfall per annum, the roots of P. fragilis may be invaded by Phytophthora that is a soil-borne fungal pathogen. It starves the plant of essential nutrients and water, and this fungus can navigate naturally through the soil to affect an entire healthy community of plants. Phytophtora can be transported long distances by animals and humans where construction machinery or vehicles have passed. Additionally, if the habitat of P. fragilis is situated close to a deforested site, there is a chance for myrtle wilt infection to the plant. Commonly caused by the naturally occurring wind-borne fungi known as Chalara australis, P. fragilis can be infected if it possesses any open wounds in its stem. This allows the fungus to enter the plant and attack the system by multiplying its spores inside the damaged plant.
