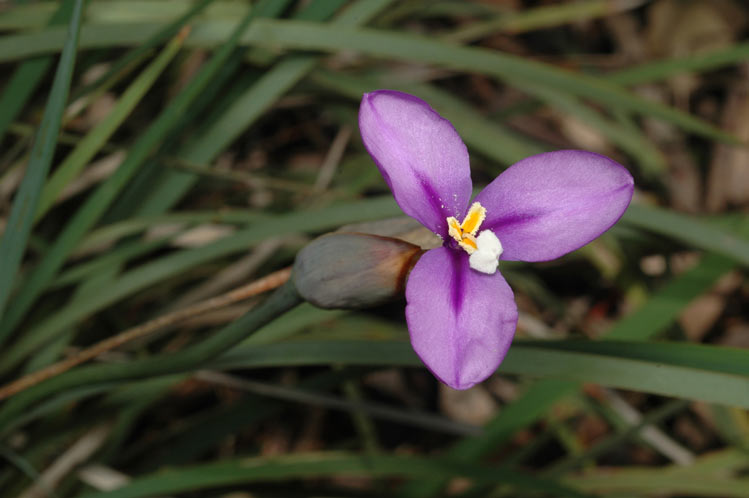
- Patersonia occidentalis in the ANBG

Scientific classification
- Kingdom: Plantae
- Clade: Tracheophytes
- Clade: Angiosperms
- Clade: Monocots
- Order: Asparagales
- Family: Iridaceae
- Genus: Patersonia
- Species: P. occidentalis

Binomial name
- Patersonia occidentalis R.Br.

Synonyms
- Genosiris occidentalis (R.Br.) F.Muell.; Patersonia bicolor Benth. nom. inval., pro syn.

= Patersonia occidentalis =

Purple flag

Species of flowering plant

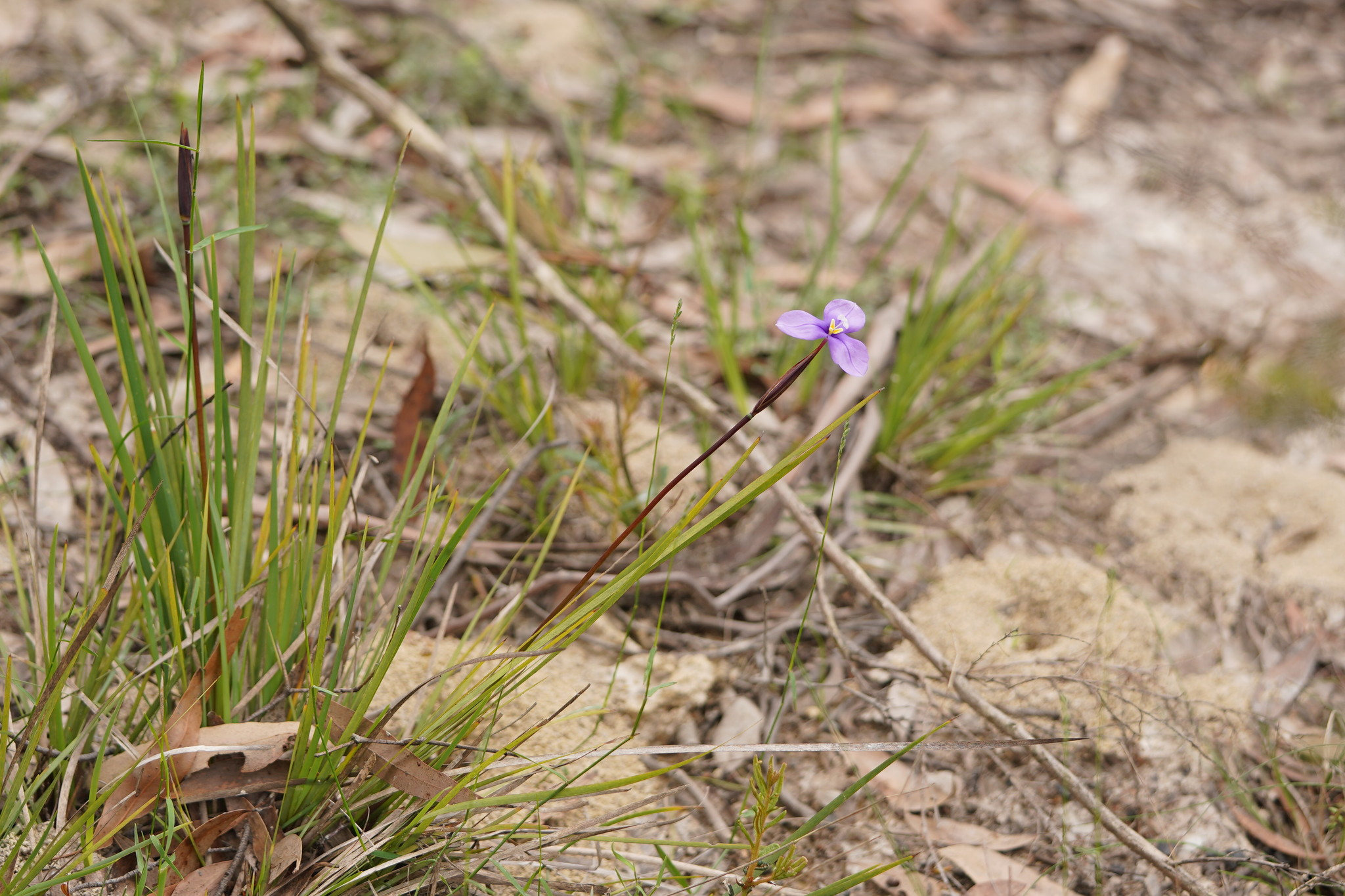
Habit near Monbulk

Patersonia occidentalis, commonly known as purple flag, or long purple-flag, is a species of flowering plant in the family Iridaceae and is endemic to southern Australia. It is a tufted, rhizome-forming perennial with narrow, sharply-pointed, strap-like leaves, egg-shaped, bluish violet sepals and a cylindrical capsule. The Noongar name for the plant is komma.

== Description ==
Patersonia occidentalis is a tufted, rhizome-forming perennial that typically grows to a height of up to 1.5 m (4 ft 11 in). It has four to ten sharply-pointed, glabrous, strap-like leaves 80–550 mm (3.1–21.7 in) long and 2–10 mm (0.079–0.394 in) wide. The flowering scape is 10–80 mm (0.39–3.15 in) long with the sheath enclosing the flowers elliptic to lance-shaped, brown and 30–50 mm (1.2–2.0 in) long. The sepals are bluish-violet, 20–35 mm (0.79–1.38 in) long and 12–22 mm (0.47–0.87 in) wide, the petals are lance-shaped and the stamen filaments are 4–7 mm (0.16–0.28 in) long and joined together. Flowering mainly occurs from September to December, each flower open for one day, but each stem producing many flowers. The fruit is a cylindrical capsule 18–25 mm (0.71–0.98 in) long.

== Taxonomy ==
Patersonia occidentalis was first formally described by the botanist Robert Brown in 1810 in his book Prodromus Florae Novae Hollandiae. The specific epithet (occidentalis) means "western", referring to the distribution of this species compared to others in the genus Patersonia.

The names of three varieties of P. occidentalis are accepted by the Australian Plant Census:

- Patersonia occidentalis var. angustifolia Benth. grows in winter-wet areas, swamps and along river banks in the Jarrah Forest, Swan Coastal Plain and Warren biogeographic regions of western Australia;
- Patersonia occidentalis var. latifolia Benth. grows in upland flats, slopes and valleys in the Avon Wheatbelt, Esperance Plains, Geraldton Sandplains, Jarrah Forest, Swan Coastal Plain and Warren biogeographic regions of Western Australia;
- Patersonia occidentalis R.Br. var. occidentalis is the most widely distributed variety, occurring in Western Australia, South Australia, Victoria and Tasmania.

== Distribution and habitat ==
Purple flag occurs in Western Australia, South Australia, Victoria and Tasmania. In Western Australia it grows in winter-wet areas, on sand dunes and around granite outcrops and is widespread and common between the Murchison River in the north and Israelite Bay in the south. In South Australia P. occidentalis grows in heath and in clearings, usually in poorly-drained sites and is only found in the south-east of the state. In Victoria the species is widespread in near-coastal areas on poorly-drained sites and in Tasmania it forms clumps in swampy places in the north and east of the state.

== Use in horticulture ==
Cultivated in gardens the species is frost tolerant and able to cope in a dry position.
