= George Maxwell =

George Maxwell (1804–1880) was a professional collector of plants and insects in Southwest Australia. The botanical specimens he obtained were used to make formal descriptions of the region's plant species.

== Biography ==
Caricature by David Low

Maxwell was born in England in 1804 and moved to Western Australia in 1840 to settle at King George Sound, remaining there until his death at Middleton Beach in 1880. He occupied himself a number of activities, selling curios and offering to guide visitors to the port. He began collecting plants and insects of the region, assisting the botanist James Drummond in 1846. The collections he made, in the company of Drummond and Ferdinand von Mueller, would provide type specimens for the publication of scientific descriptions. Maxwell's collections are now preserved in Australian herbarium, his contribution to the botanical knowledge of the region and Flora Australiensis was noted by Mueller in the Gardeners' Chronicle;

Only two years ago I made long journeys with him over rough country for several days on horseback to collect plants and seeds. More than 30 years ago he conducted Drummond through the Stirling Ranges in the journey that proved so memorable in the discovery of many splendid plants. He was nearly always in the bush, and engaged in collecting seeds, botanical and entomological specimens. Encouraged by myself, he undertook several extensive journeys over then untrodden ground, eastward as far as the Great Bight, and thus found many new plants and enabled us to extend the known limits of the range of many rare species, as recorded in the Flora Australiensis.

The expedition with Drummond began in the Stirling Ranges in 1846, continuing on to Cape Riche and Mount Barren. The specimens obtained on their journey became known as Drummond's fourth collection, many of which are referenced in published descriptions of the region's species.

Maxwell is thought to have been partnered with William Webb, who continued the trade in specimens after his death.

The following species were named by Mueller and Jeremy Bentham in recognition of this collector:

- Eriostemon maxwelli
- Genosiris maxwelli, transferred to Patersonia maxwellii
- Lasiopetalum maxwellii
- Phymatocarpus maxwellii
- Pimelea maxwelli (Pimelea brevifolia subsp. brevifolia)
- Poa maxwelli (Poa serpentum)

Botanical specimens collected by Maxwell are cared for at multiple institutions, including the National Herbarium of Victoria (MEL), Royal Botanic Gardens Victoria.
